= Dancing Turtle =

London-based media company

Dancing Turtle Group
- Type: Private
- Industry: Music, digital media, film
- Founded: 2005
- Founder: Dominic Brown
- Headquarters: London, United Kingdom
- Divisions: Dancing Turtle Records; Dancing Turtle Media; Dancing Turtle Films
- Website: www.dancingturtle.com

Dancing Turtle Group (also known as Dancing Turtle) is a London-based media company founded in 2005 by Dominic Brown. It comprises a record label, a creative agency and a documentary film studio.

== Dancing Turtle Records ==
Dancing Turtle Records was launched in 2005 as an independent label for emerging artists. Its catalogue leans towards indie folk, electronica, experimental and world music, with releases from artists in countries including Japan, West Papua, Brazil, Italy and the United Kingdom. The label's management arm represents artists including The Lani Singers and Inkliing.

The label's best-documented release is Ninalik Ndawi (2008), the debut album by The Lani Singers, the West Papuan husband-and-wife duo Benny and Maria Wenda. It was reviewed in The Guardian. The follow-up, Ninalik Arirak (2013), was reviewed in Songlines.

== Dancing Turtle Media ==
Dancing Turtle Media launched in 2008 as a digital production and creative agency. Clients have included Asian Dub Foundation, the Green Man Festival and On-U Sound. Its production team has also worked with the BBC and Channel 4 News.

== Dancing Turtle Films ==
Dancing Turtle Films produces documentaries on human rights, self-determination movements and civil resistance, often on stories under-reported by mainstream media.

Its first production, Forgotten Bird of Paradise (2009), was filmed undercover on the West Papuan independence struggle. It was featured on BBC Newsnight and screened at the Raindance Film Festival. La Badil (2012) is an undercover report on the Western Sahara self-determination movement. A feature documentary on West Papuan leader Benny Wenda was announced for television broadcast in Australia and New Zealand in 2016.

Year	Title	Subject
2009	Forgotten Bird of Paradise	West Papua independence movement
2012	La Badil	Western Sahara
2012	Being King Arthur	Man claiming to be the reincarnation of King Arthur
2013	Başlangıç	Anti-government protests in Turkey
2015	The Road to Home	Benny Wenda

Dancing Turtle Films also operates a distribution arm, which licenses documentaries to educational institutions and libraries.
