= National Committee for West Papua =

Organization campaigning for self-determination

The National Committee for West Papua (Indonesian: Komite Nasional Papua Barat, abbreviated KNPB) is an organization in Papua, Indonesia that campaigns peacefully for a self-determination referendum for Papuans. It was established on 19 November 2008 by a number of Papuan NGOs. The right to self-determination was provided for in an agreement between the Netherlands, Indonesia, and the UN in 1962.

== Overview ==
The International Parliamentarians for West Papua (IPWP) and the International Lawyers for West Papua (ILWP) support the case of the KNPB, using legal methods to realize the right to self-determination of Papuans. They recognize the West Papua National Committee as the local advocate for self-determination, according to Mario Pigei of the KNPB. At a KNPB rally marking the registration of the IPWP and ILWP at the European Union in Brussels, coordinator Mario Pigei said "Human rights violations continue being committed in Papua with the killings of Papuan leaders like Kelly Kwalik"

The KNPB tries to achieve its goals through non-violent means and with dignity. KNPB cooperates with the International Parliamentarians for West Papua and the International Lawyers for West Papua (ILWP). KNPB was formed in 2008 in Jayapura by various Papuan NGOs.

In April 2009, eight protesters were killed by police during a demonstration, organized by the KNPB, involving more than 15,000 people. A police officer was wounded by an arrow.

In 2009, at the suggestion of the KNPB, hundreds of Papuan students in Java, Bali, Makassar and Manado made an exodus back to Papua to set up shelters in the field in Sentani, where Theys Eluay is buried. They were, however, chased from there by the police. Several students were arrested and imprisoned.

On 22 March 2010, the KNPB organized a series of new street demonstrations. Fifteen participants were arrested after police used firearms to disperse the crowd.

In November 2010, the Congress of the KNPB elected Buchtar Tabuni as chairman, Augustine Trapen as Secretary, Mako Tabuni as vice-chairman, and Victor Yeimo as International Spokesperson. KNPB branches were established in almost all regions of West Papua. The KNPB has also representatives in Jakarta and Manado. The KNPB has a strong international network.

Buchtar Tabuni and Victor Yeimo were both arrested and sentenced to three years' imprisonment charged with incitement and a breach of the security of the state of Indonesia. In 2011 Buchtar was again imprisoned, charged with destroying prison property, while in custody.

In May 2012, a German tourist, Pieter Dietmar Helmut was non-fatally shot while swimming with his wife in Base G beach, the perpetrators were later revealed to be members of extremist faction of KNPB led by Mako Tabuni, three members were later caught and charged with manslaughter.

His deputy, Mako Tabuni, was assassinated on 14 June 2012 by plain cloth police officers, members of the anti terrorist unit Densus 88. Victor Yeimo succeeded Buchtar Tabuni as chairman, but went immediately in hiding as the police was also after him.

In September 2012, bomb-making material was found at the KNPB secretariat in Wamena, with nine men arrested were charged under a law banning the possession, transfer, sale or use of explosives.

The KNPB has been successful in mobilizing thousands of people in almost all regions of West Papua. On 2 August 2011, the ILWP organized a Conference to seek legal ways to resolve the political status of West Papua. According to ILWP, the present status is considered illegal as the population never was enabled to exercise the right to self-determination to which it was entitled according to international treaties, which were supervised by the UN.

== See also ==
- United Liberation Movement for West Papua (ULMWP)
- Free Papua Movement
- Papua conflict
- Republic of West Papua (proposed state)
- Benny Wenda
