= Dominic Brown (filmmaker) =

British filmmaker

- Born: London, England, UK

Dominic Brown (born 1980) is an English independent documentary filmmaker, based in London.

== Film Projects ==
His first production was an undercover documentary, Forgotten Bird of Paradise, released in 2009. It details the ongoing struggle for freedom being fought by the indigenous people in the Indonesian occupied province of West Papua. He produced, directed and filmed the documentary alone. It was shown at festivals including Raindance, and was awarded 'Best Documentary' at the 2011 Dam Short Film Festival, and 'Best Short Documentary' at the 2015 Davis International Film Festival, USA.

In 2012, Brown's second documentary, La Badil (No Other Choice), was released. Set in the Moroccan controlled territory of Western Sahara, it tells the story of the struggle for self-determination of the indigenous Sahrawi people and the situation they've face since failed uprisings there in 2010. In an interview published by Newstime Africa, the filmmaker stated that his motivation behind the film stemmed from Western Sahara "very rarely getting the media coverage that it deserves". The film was shortlisted for Best Documentary at the 2013 Portobello Film Festival in London.

In 2013 he co-produced a documentary, Being King Arthur, about a former British army soldier turned druid who claims to be the reincarnation of King Arthur. In the same year he also filmed and produced a short film, Başlangıç (The Beginning), set around the anti-government protests in Istanbul, Turkey.

In 2015, Brown released The Road to Home, a feature-length documentary about the West Papua independence leader Benny Wenda. It was awarded 'Best Documentary' at the 2016 Amsterdam Film Festival.

== Television ==
Footage he shot in West Papua was featured in an extended BBC Newsnight report in March 2009, and also on BBC World News Today. SBS News in Australia also ran a feature report following the release of Forgotten Bird of Paradise.

He has also worked with Channel 4 News on reports related to the torture of West Papuan civilians by the Indonesian military.

== Filmography ==
- Forgotten Bird of Paradise - 2009
- La Badil (No Other Choice) - 2012
- Being King Arthur - 2012
- Başlangıç (The Beginning) - 2013
- The Road To Home - 2015
