= United Liberation Movement for West Papua =

West Papua independence umbrella organization

- Coat of arms Flag
- Formation: 7 December 2014 – present
- Type: Independence movement
- Purpose: West Papuan independence
- Chairman: Disputed between Menase Tabuni and Benny Wenda
- International Spokesperson: Jacob Rumbiak
- Website: Official website

The United Liberation Movement for West Papua (ULMWP) is an organization formed from the merger of three political independence movements seeking independence for Western New Guinea (West Papua) from Indonesia. The ULMWP was formed on 7 December 2014 in Vanuatu uniting the Federal Republic of West Papua (NRFPB), the West Papua National Coalition for Liberation (WPNCL) and the National Parliament of West Papua (NPWP). The ULMWP is internationally recognized by the Melanesian Spearhead Group (MSG).

== History ==
In October 2013, the West Papua National Council for Liberation made an unsuccessful application to join the Melanesian Spearhead Group (MSG). Indonesia had earlier been granted observer status in 2011 for Papua (province) and West Papua (province). The MSG advised that West Papua independence organisations must first unite for any future applications to be considered.

In December 2014, three West Papuan independence movement groups united under a single umbrella organisation, the United Liberation Movement for West Papua in Vanuatu.

In February 2015, Bishop Desmond Tutu of South Africa according to Benny Wenda, stated he was shocked that West Papua is still not free. In 2004, the Bishop had asked the UN to review the Act of Free Choice.

In June 2015, the ULMWP was granted MSG observer status as representative of West Papuans outside the country while Indonesia was upgraded to associate member.

In September 2016, at the 71st Session of the UN General Assembly, the Prime Ministers of Vanuatu, Solomon Islands, Tonga, Tuvalu, and the Presidents of Nauru and Marshall Islands, called for UN action on alleged human rights abuses committed on West Papua's indigenous Melanesians. The Solomon Islands stated that human rights abuses were linked to the pursuit for independence, and Tuvalu raised autonomy. Indonesia responded that the allegations were false and fabricated. The Solomon Islands said that Indonesia should give UN special rapporteurs access to West Papua to prove allegations were false.

In October, the UN Committee for the Elimination of Racial Discrimination initiated an early warning and urgent action procedure, and requested Indonesia to formally respond to allegations of racial violence by mid-November, where Indonesia never responded to the UN hearing.

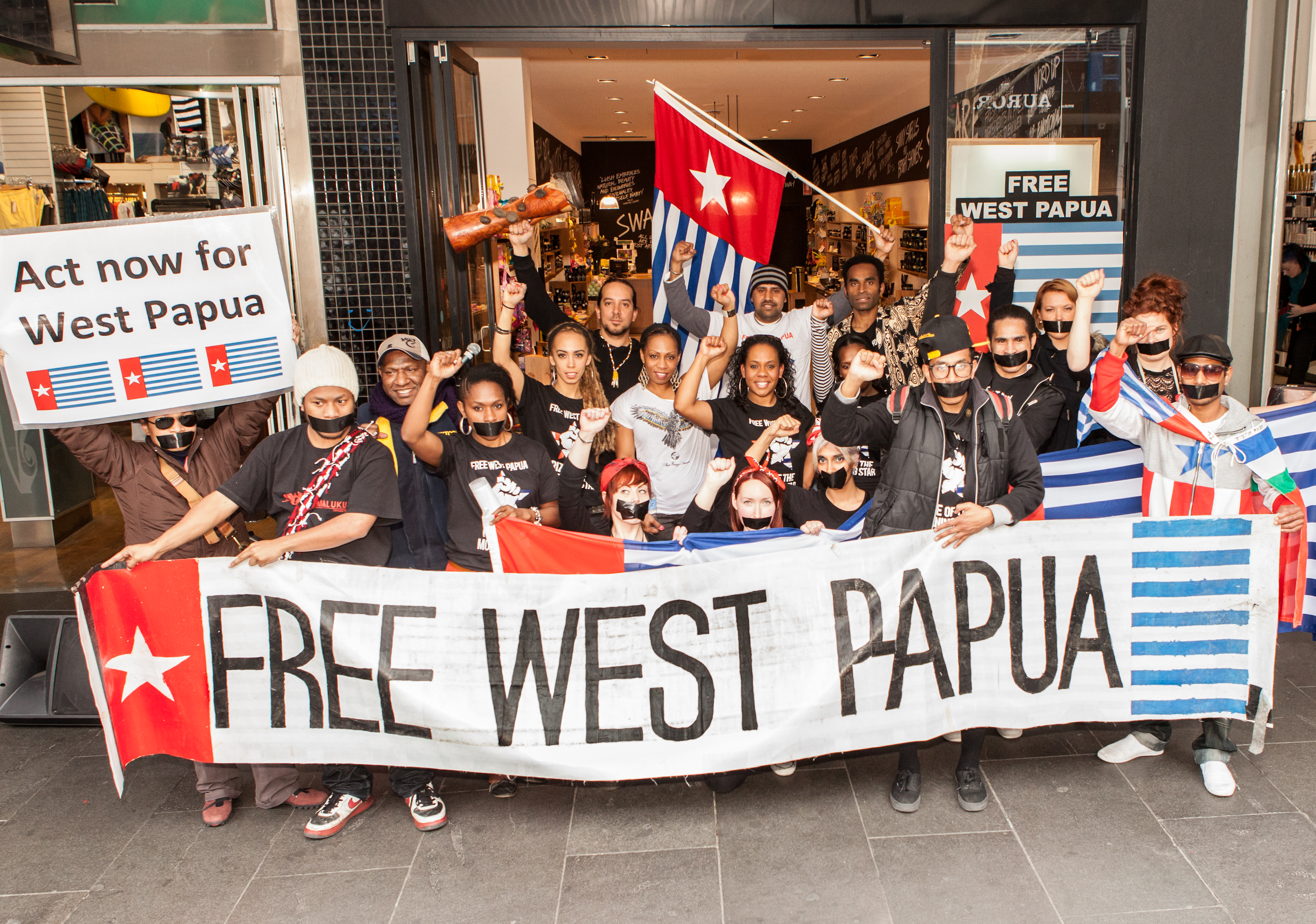
Free West Papua protest in Melbourne, August 2012

In March 2017, at the 34th regular session of the UN Human Rights Council, Vanuatu made a joint statement on behalf of Tonga, Nauru, Palau, Tuvalu, the Marshall Islands and Solomon Islands raising human rights abuses and requested that the UN High Commissioner for Human Rights produce a report. Indonesia replied that it rejected Vanuatu's allegations. Also, a joint NGO statement was made raising the depopulation of indigenous West Papuans and health and medical services especially in remote areas. Indonesia replied that the allegation of depopulation of Papuan community is simply baseless.

In May 2017, at the Council of Ministers of the African, Caribbean and Pacific Group of States (ACP) a joint statement by Vanuatu, Solomon Islands, Tonga, Tuvalu, Nauru, Palau, and the Marshall Islands raised human rights abuses which were described as slow-motion genocide and called for a resolution to support self-determination. Papua New Guinea suggested a fact-finding mission. Guinea-Bissau compared the plight of West Papua to East Timor.

In May 2017, eleven New Zealand parliamentarians from four political parties signed the Westminster Declaration, which calls for West Papua's right to self-determination to be legally recognised through an internationally supervised vote.

In September 2017, at the 72nd Session of the UN General Assembly, the Prime Ministers of the Solomon Islands, Tuvalu and Vanuatu once again raised human rights concerns and the Caribbean nation of Saint Vincent and the Grenadines. Vanuatu called for a Human Rights Council investigation into killings and human rights abuses by Indonesian security forces and appealed to world leaders to support self-determination with the Solomon Islands also calling for self-determination. Indonesia denied all the allegations and stated that West Papua would remain part of Indonesia.

On 26 September 2017, ULMWP spokesperson Benny Wenda claimed that at the United Nations General Assembly he presented a secret petition for self-determination signed by 1.8 million West Papuans to the Special Committee on Decolonization. The Chair of the Special Committee on Decolonisation, Rafael Ramírez, subsequently responded that he had not received a petition and even if one was presented it would be outside the mandate of the committee. Ramírez said that the committee accepts Indonesia's sovereignty over West Papua and that his office had been "manipulated" for political purposes.

On 1 December 2017, Benny Wenda was elected Chairman of the ULMWP following an organisational restructure. Jacob Rumbiak now serves as the International Spokesperson.

On 1 July 2019, the ULMWP announced that earlier in May West Papuan military factions had united under the one command to form the West Papua Army, including the West Papua Revolutionary Army (TRWP), the West Papuan National Army (TNPB) and the West Papua National Liberation Army (TPNPB), with the command to be under "the political leadership of the ULMWP". The TPNPB released a statement in response denying that it had merged and called for a retraction and apology and said it had withdrawn from the ULMWP following a ULMWP summit in Vanuatu in 2017.

On 1 December 2020, the ULMWP announced it was forming a provisional government for the Republic of West Papua with a provisional constitution and that Benny Wenda would be the interim president. However this declaration was rejected and not recognised by other rebel groups such as the TPNPB who stated that the ULMWP and Benny Wenda is a failure, and Benny Wenda is a British citizen and therefore cannot be President of West Papua.

In November 2021, the ULMWP announced its Green State Vision at the COP26 Climate Conference in Glasgow, UK. During a yearly session at the National Parliament of West Papua on 14–17 October 2022 in Jayapura, the ULMWP has set a temporary constitution.

In September 2023, Menase Tabuni was appointed as the new President of ULMWP, replacing Benny Wenda, after a summit in Vanuatu. Markus Haluk was appointed as the new Secretary. Tabuni dissolved the provisional government of West Papua, but pledged to continue the struggle for independence.

The leadership change in September 2023 was disputed by some members of ULMWP who then held a new congress in November 2023 in Jayapura. The Jayapura congress resulted in the reinstatement of Benny Wenda as president of ULMWP.

The Vanuatu summit faction of ULMWP does not recognize the congress in Jayapura and the subsequent reinstatement of Benny Wenda. On 27 November 2023, Menase Tabuni and Markus Haluk announced that ULMWP had suspended Benny Wenda's membership, along with several prominent figures connected to the Jayapura congress.

== Organisational structure ==
=== National Parliament of West Papua ===
The National Parliament of West Papua (PNWP) incorporates the National Committee for West Papua (KNPB).

=== West Papua National Coalition for Liberation ===
The West Papua National Coalition for Liberation (WPNCL) is a group of organisations seeking independence that was formed on 20 December 2005. Its current Secretary General is Rex Rumakiek.

The Coalition aims to raise the issue of West Papua in Oceania's regional organisations. It is seeking observer status for West Papua at the Melanesian Spearhead Group, which it was granted in 2015, and has announced it would request the Papua New Guinean government to bring up the question of West Papua at the Pacific Islands Forum.

== International support ==
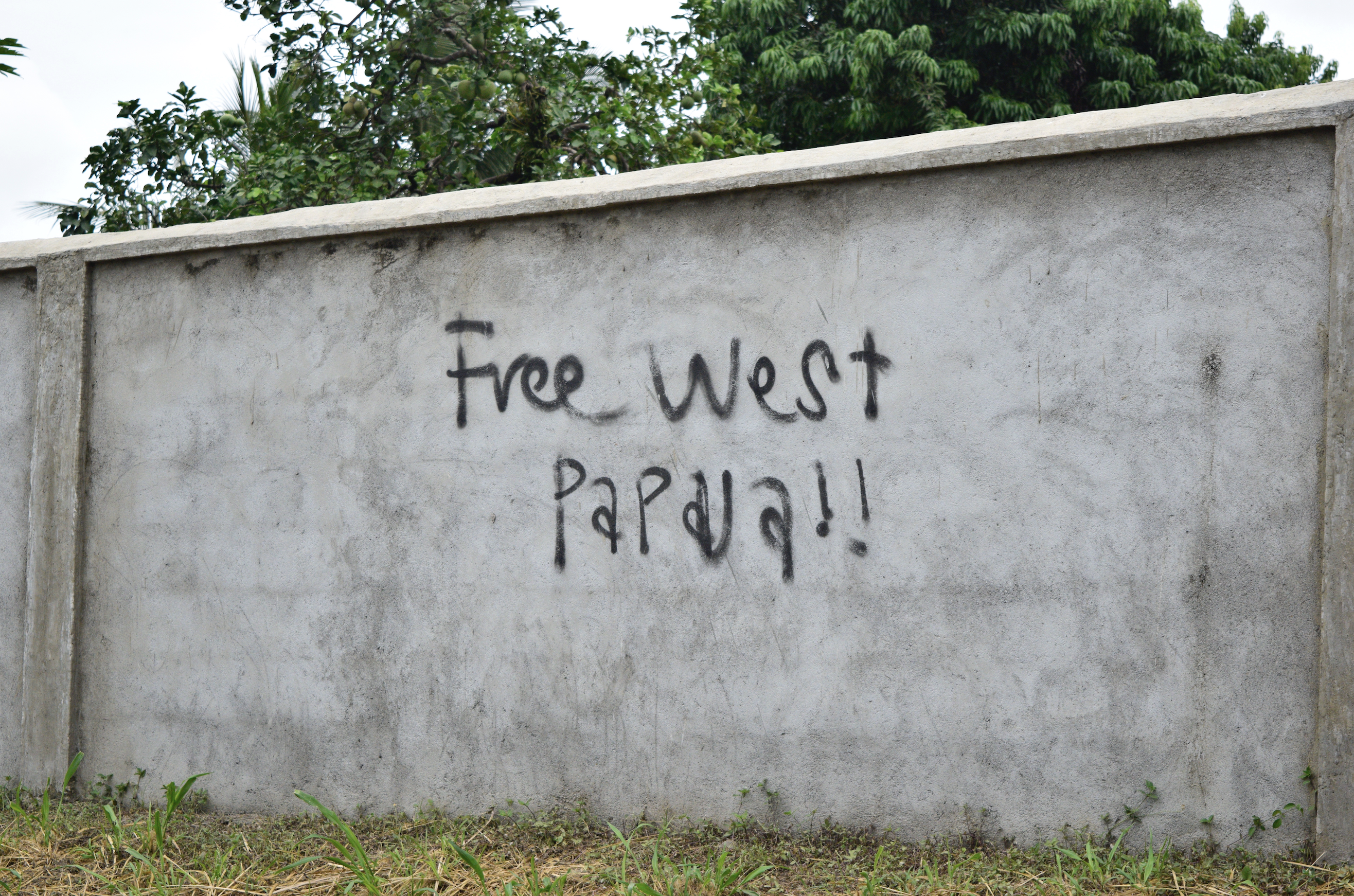
Graffiti in Vanuatu advocating for the liberation of West Papua

Vanuatu has been an advocate for the liberation of West Papua. The 11th Prime Minister of Vanuatu, Charlot Salwai, spoke 'in support of West Papuan human rights and self-determination'. Various other pacific leaders also provided their support at the United Nations.

International non-governmental actors have also demonstrated their belief in the cause. Indonesia has criticised Vanuatu for undermining Indonesian sovereignty, but it has not fettered their ongoing political and cultural support.

== See also ==
- Papua conflict
- West New Guinea dispute
- International Parliamentarians for West Papua (IPWP)
- Benny Wenda
- Mapenduma hostage crisis
