= Umar Hussein =

Indonesian diplomat (born 1935)

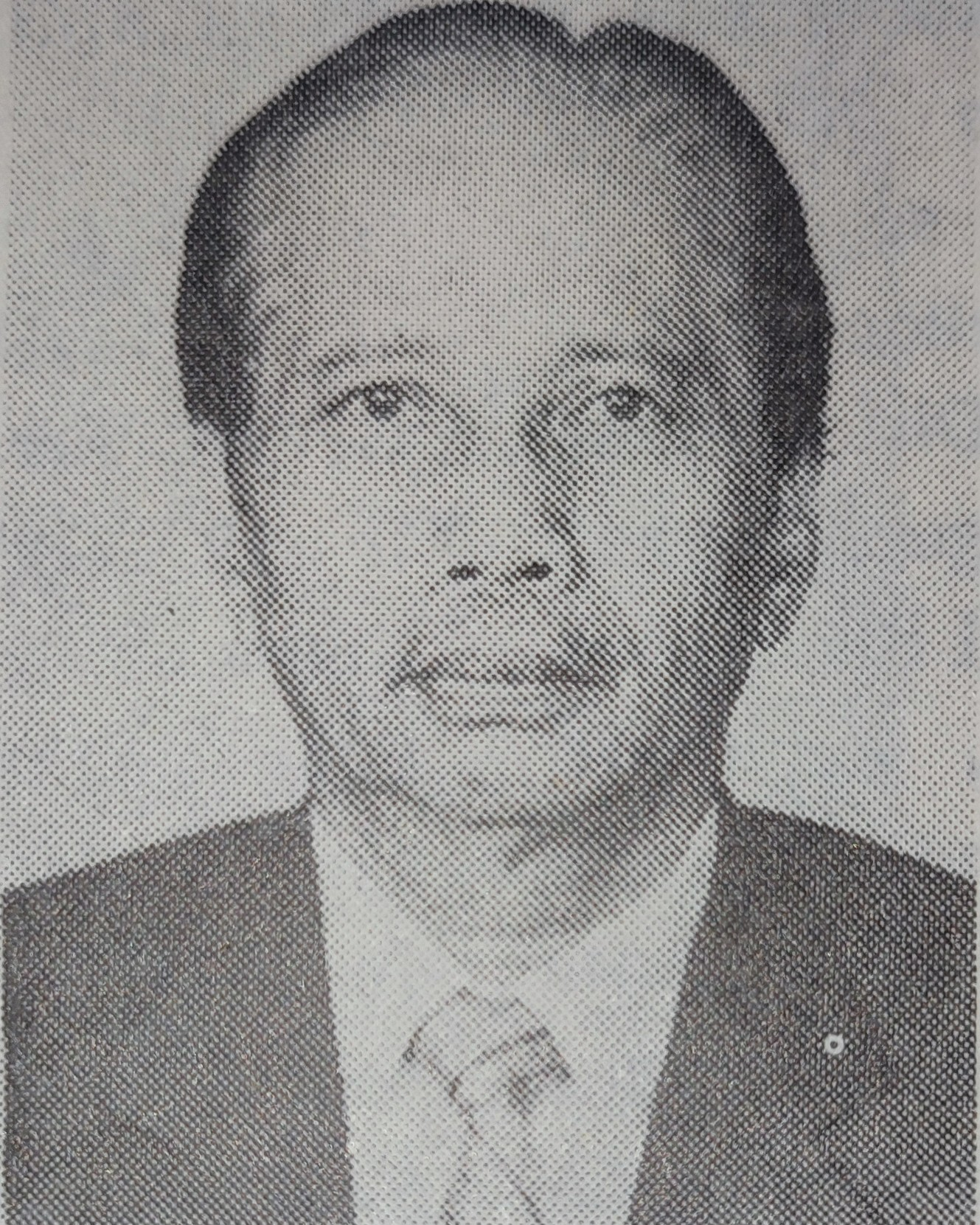

Ambassador of Indonesia to Iraq
- In office 1993–1996
- Preceded by: Joko Marseno Tarunokusumo
- Succeeded by: Moebramsjah

Personal details
- Born: 30 October 1935 (age 90) Watampone, Dutch East Indies
- Children: 2
- Education: Foreign Service Academy; National University (Drs.)

Umar Hussein (born 30 October 1935) is an Indonesian diplomat who served as ambassador to Iraq from 1993 to 1995. Previously, he was deputy chief of mission at the embassy in Manila and assistant to the deputy for international affairs in the National Defense and Security Council.

== Early life and education ==
Umar Hussein was born in Watampone, South Sulawesi, on 30 October 1935. Umar earned his baccalaureate (sarjana muda, lit. 'young bachelor', equivalent to an associate degree in the Western higher education system) from the Foreign Service Academy in 1957, and a bachelor's degree from the Faculty of Social and Politics at National University in 1971. He completed senior diplomatic course in 1976. Umar, who is a Muslim, is married and has two children.

== Diplomatic career ==
Umar Hussein joined the foreign department shortly after completing his diplomatic education in 1957. From 1961 to 1963, he served as a foreign department representative in the Nationality Advisory Council of the defense and security department. He went overseas for the first time for his posting at the embassy in Stockholm in 1963, where he acquired the diplomatic rank of attaché before being promoted to third secretary a few years later. He was then sent to the embassy in Paris, where he served from 1965 to 1967.

Umar returned to Jakarta in 1967 as the chief of general section with the foreign department's personnel bureau. During the months leading up to the Act of Free Choice, between 1968 and 1969 Umar worked under the West Irian governor to prepare for the referendum. He was then named as the head of political and economic section in the secretariat of the Directorate General of Foreign Security and Communication, serving from 1970 to 1971.

Umar underwent a second round of overseas posting in 1971, becoming a first secretary at the embassy in Moscow. He was promoted to counsellor shortly later. He returned to the Directorate General of Foreign Security and Communication in 1975, which by then had already been renamed as the Directorate General of Foreign Relations Security. He returned to overseas posting in Eastern bloc countries, serving with the rank of minister counsellor at the embassy in Pyongyang from 1978 to 1980 and in Budapest from 1980 to 1982.

After returning to Jakarta in 1982, between 1983 and 1985 he was the chief of administration in the directorate of international agreements and then the deputy director for the Northern and Eastern Europe region. He was assigned to the embassy in Hanoi from 1985 to 1987 before being promoted as deputy chief of mission at the embassy in Manila from 1987 to 1990. After his stint in Manila, Umar took on a domestic role as assistant to the deputy for international affairs National Defence and Security Council. On 8 April 1993, Umar was sworn in as Indonesia's ambassador to Iraq. He was in the post until October 1996.
