= Baliem Valley campaign =

Series of campaigns in the Baliem Valley

- Part of the Papua conflict
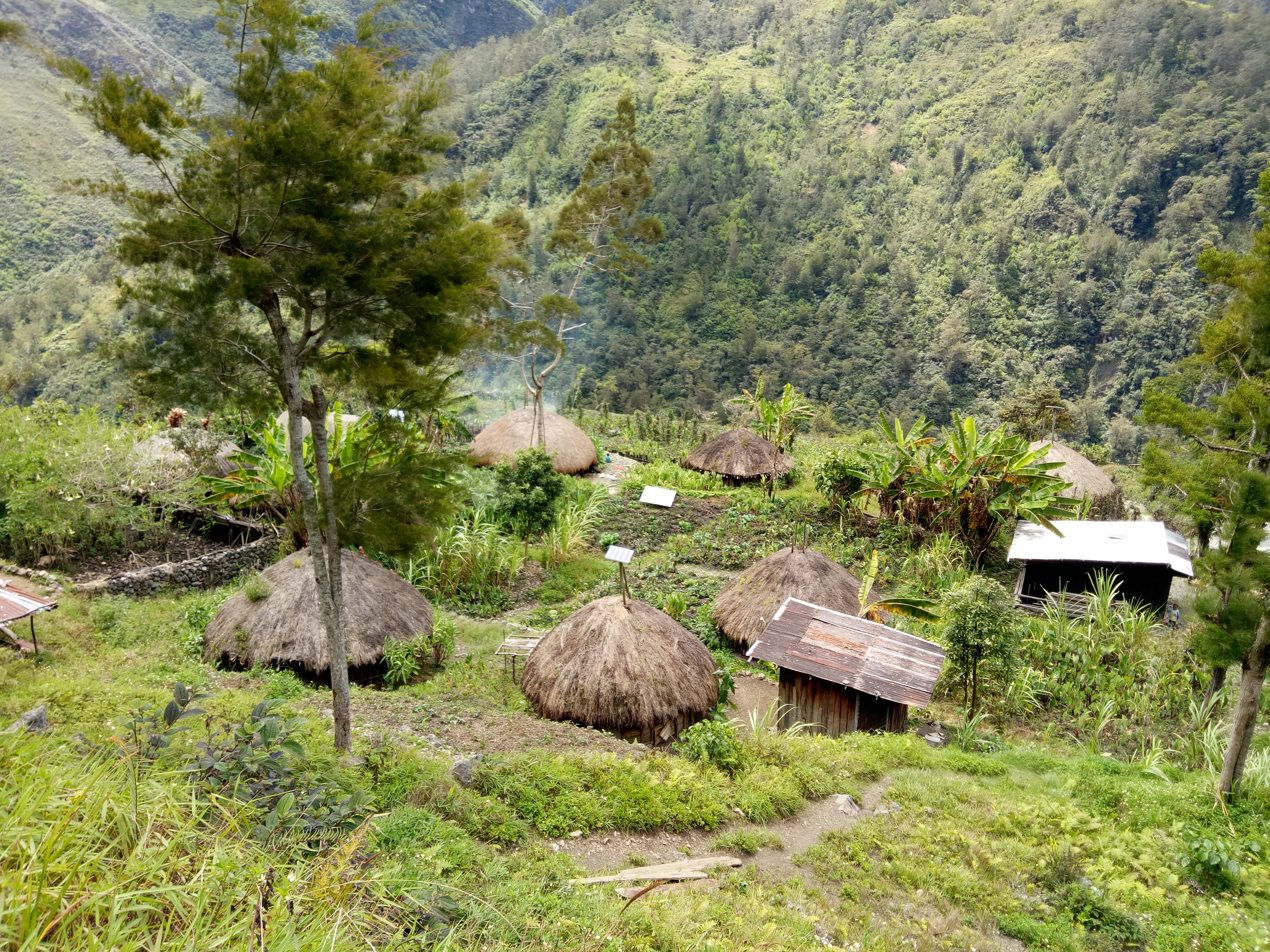
- The view of a village in the Baliem Valley

- Current borders of Jayawijaya Regency, where the Baliem Valley is located
- Location: 4.0833°S 139.0833°E; Jayawijaya Regency, Irian Jaya, Indonesia
- Date: July 1977 – August 1978
- Target: OPM and TPNPB rebels Papuan civilians
- Attack type: Bombings, mass killings, executions (including immolation and beheadings), enforced disappearances, torture, rape, looting and ecocide
- Deaths: 4,146 – 26,000+
- Victims: 3,000+ displaced
- Perpetrators: Indonesian Armed Forces; Indonesian Army; Indonesian Air Force
- Motive: Counterinsurgency; Anti-Papuan sentiment; Anti-Christian sentiment; Genocidal intent (alleged)

The Baliem Valley campaign or also known as the Central Highlands campaign and the Baliem Valley massacre or the Central Highlands massacre refers to a period of over a year from early July 1977 to late August 1978 when the Indonesian Armed Forces and Air Force, supported by Australian forces, conducted a series of ground and aerial attacks against the Free Papua Movement and the West Papua National Liberation Army during Operation Cenderawasih (Bird of Paradise). The campaign was conducted in the Central Highlands region of Western New Guinea. The campaign was mainly centered in the area in and around the Baliem Valley in Jayawijaya Regency which was then in the province of Irian Jaya, but now is in the province of Highland Papua. Some of the campaign also took place in the neighboring Paniai Regency which is now in the present day Central Papua province.

During the campaign the Indonesian Army allegedly committed attacks on civilian targets, as well as allegedly deliberately targeting valley's ecosystem. Violence against the indigenous and attacks by the OPM against the Indonesian military are still common in region. In 2013 the Australian Defence Force denied that it had been involved in the campaign, but this denial is not supported by contemporaneous reporting on the campaign.

== Background ==
From September 1976 to May 1977 the Indonesian Army purchased 16 OV-10 Broncos from the United States in six batches.

It has been claimed, that in early 1977, Indonesia bought several Bell UH-1 Iroquois helicopters from Australia. The Royal Australian Air Force also sent several pilots for a six-week mapping exercise.

On 20 April OPM members attacked police officers at a football field in Kobakma killing one and injuring two others. Some time after this attack an Indonesian soldier allegedly shot and killed a civilian, however the Indonesian Army denied any involvement in the shooting and claimed the man was killed in a tribal conflict. The next day the OPM launched several attacks on the military posts in Makki, Pyramid also called Piramid and Kasuraga, they also attacked the villages of Wosilimo and Kimbim.

On 28 July the Kodam XVII/Cenderawasih bombed several villages in the southern Jayapura Regency reportedly killing at least 1,605 people. A RAAF pilot stationed in Timika allegedly witnessed the attack and gave information to an Australian journalist Robin Osborne. The attack was confirmed by the commander of Kodim 1702/Jayawijaya Albert Dien and United States senator John Glenn. They also added that the Indonesian Army also used two Bell UH-1 Iroquois helicopters in the attack.

On 29 July a Bell UH-1 Iroquois helicopter designated A2-379 reportedly crashed into a jungle ridge 15 km north of Wamena at an altitude of 3,000 meters, due to weather conditions. The helicopter had two pilots and three crewmen, all five were a part of the No. 9 Squadron RAAF. The pilot Flt. Lt. Ralph Nigel Keith Taylor was killed instantly. The other four occupants would survive, the co-pilot Lt. Greg Cashmere was severely injured and was knocked unconscious, crewman Patrick "Paddy" Sinclair was injured when a tree branch came through the floor of the helicopter and hit Sinclair fracturing his pelvis, which later became dislocated after he bent down to try and drag out an unconscious Cashmere from his seat, the two other crewmen were also injured.

Shortly after the crash the survivors attempted to contact the RAAF with a AN/PRC-90 but were not able to make contact, one of the crewmen then used a F1 HF to try and contact the RAAF but allegedly, due to frequency skip, they accidentally contacted the Special Air Service Regiment who were conducting an exercise in Central Australia. The SAS then contacted the relevant authorities and were flown to Darwin and then flown to Wamena in a C-130A to assist in the search.

The next day the wreckage of A2-379 was found after the survivors fired a signal flare at a DHC-4 Caribou, the caribou contacted the RAAF which resulted in the SAS being sent in to rescue the soldiers in A2-149.

A week after the crash of A2-379 in early August an Australian Army Pilatus PC-6 Porter was shot at over the village of Warok, a shell narrowly missed the pilot.

A few months later on 12 October a privately owned Bell 205 helicopter, chartered by the Petromer OH Company crashed in a forest south of Wauo in Western New Guinea, the American pilot was killed while the Indonesian co-pilot survived.

== Campaign ==
It was reported that on 5 July 1977 over 1,000 villagers in the Yamsi-Arso border area were killed in several napalm attacks and bombings.

On 22 July, two OV-10 Bronco planes numbered S104 and S114 bombarded the Akimuga villages. The alleged attack only ended after they ran out of ammunition, and it is unclear how many people were killed in the attack.

Between August and September Karubaga, Bokandini, Kulula, Pyramid and Mage were reported as being bombarded by the Indonesian Air Force. At around the same time 4,982 people were allegedly killed in aerial bombardments in Wamena and Jayawijaya.

In Tiom violence against the indigenous population was especially common. Papuans were alleged to sometimes have been attacked with axes, burned alive, sliced with razors and thrown in wells. A tribal leader in Dila, Nalogian Kibak was reportedly killed by the Indonesian Army and the military commander in Nabire, Lt. Col. Soekemi forced several tribal leaders, teachers and priests to drink Kibak's blood at gun point.

Rev. Matius Wenda, who was 8 or 9 at the time has claimed he witnessed several atrocities, including massacres and other abuses. Wenda recalled that he witnessed several military officers force a husband and wife to have sexual intercourse in public under the threat of being killed, the act was filmed and sent to other Indonesians and people abroad to show that the Papuans were like 'animals', he also recalled that he witnessed several soldiers forcibly insert batteries into a woman's vagina while her husband was severely beaten.

One survivor reported that they witnessed Commander Albert Dien summarily execute two civilians in Wamena sometime in 1977.

Sexual violence against women was alleged to be common, some women reportedly had their breasts cut off and sometimes had their internal organs ripped out, many were also raped and often murdered, in some cases soldiers would force hot iron rods into women's rectums until they died, pregnant women often had their stomachs cut open. In the village of Kuyawagi, several pregnant women allegedly had their stomachs cut open with bayonets.

Violence against children was also alleged, in one reported incident a child was beheaded, with the severed head then thrown into a fire, several other children were thrown into the fire and burned alive, a woman who was seven months pregnant was assaulted causing her to miscarry.

Hermanus Himana alleged that he had to flee his home village of Pupuba after four relatives were killed by the Indonesian Army, the first one killed being a teacher named Stab, who was buried alive in Wamena. Stab's brother Seklekema was allegedly killed at a bridge near Wamena, with his body was dumped into a river. Another relative Bayuk was allegedly killed with an axe and then dismembered.

It is believed the Indonesian Army massacred at least 90 people in the village of Korebago.

Separatist communist rebel group OPM alleged that the Indonesian Army gunned down 1,012 people who were attending mass at a church in Kobakma, the Indonesian Army then burnt down the church and looted several homes which they would burn as well, the soldiers also destroyed farms and killed their livestock. The Indonesian Air Force also are alleged to have targeted the Kingmi Church in Bolakme, although it is unclear if anyone was killed in the bombings. The craters left by the bombs are still visible in the form of small ponds in the area.

It is reported that a number of Papuans fought back against the Indonesian Army throughout the campaign. One notable incident was when ten villagers in Pyramid allegedly stole several guns from the army, which they would use to kill five Indonesian soldiers. The following day the an unknown number of villagers were massacred by the army in reprisal.

One survivor of a massacre described how civilians were lined up in a field and shot, the witness maintaining they had survived by pretending to be dead.

At some point the villages of Hullatus and Pyramid were reportedly burned to the ground, an Australian journalist Denis Reinhardt who interviewed several Papuans described the villages as “burned out shells”.

Reinhardt also reported that as many as 90 Papuans were killed in the village of Korebago.

Reinhardt also reported that a group Christian missionaries and an American civilian were allegedly forced by the military to fly over dangerous areas in the valley.

== Aftermath ==
Some human rights groups have accused the Indonesian government of committing a genocide in the valley due to the deliberate killings and forcible relocation of Papuan civilians, alleging many were targeted for their ethnicity and or religion; and that churches and religious leaders were often targets for attacks.

Most claims have not been properly substantiated, and it may be possible that OPM and Human Rights organizations may have exaggerated claims. There is a great deal of uncertainty around this event, its causes, the involvement of the OPM in the violence, and the involvement of the Australian military. What is not in doubt is that there was a serious conflict in the Baliem Valley, which can also be viewed in the context of the Suharto regime's sustained campaign of Human Rights abuses across Indonesia during the entire Orde Baru period from 1965 - 1998. After the campaign the Indonesian Army claimed they had never used cluster munitions and napalm against villages in the Baliem Valley.

The following list of effects have also been claimed, but the claims in many cases have never been properly verified:

The rainforest in the Baliem Valley was severely affected in the campaign as it was alleged to have been lit on fire by Indonesian soldiers several times, causing the Indonesian military to be accused of ecocide.

Around half of the villages in the Baliem Valley were alleged to have been burned to the ground.

1,500-3,000 Papuan refugees reportedly fled from West Papua mainly to Papua New Guinea, mostly between 20 and 25 June 1978. A nun who was interviewed by Peter Tatchell, was quoted as saying "I have been told by refugees coming over, of people being cast out to sea in canoes and dropped overboard in copra bags – of people being forced to dig their own graves and being shot into them. I have seen people who have had their eyes torn out by the Indonesians. I’ve heard of people being beaten and sent back to their villages as examples." This nun also reported that she and her colleagues, who had set up a quarantine camp to shelter refugees, contacted the United Nations, who reportedly sent several representatives to interview the nuns and several refugees who were camping out on the PNG side of the border, the representatives concluded that the refugee's claims were genuine and said that their lives "would be in jeopardy" if they were to attempt to return home. In September 1977 around 700 refugees agreed to return to West Papua, but reportedly felt forced to flee again when they found out a platoon of soldiers was waiting for them. In another reported incident a group of refugees returning to West Papua were greeted by the military at an airstrip; the soldiers allegedly took them to a field behind the hangars and gunned them down with automatic weapons.

== Casualties ==
At least 4,146 people are reported to have died, while some estimates place the number of Papuans killed at 26,000 Papuans. Out of the reported 4,146 killed 3,017 were male 1,122 were female most of which were killed in Wosilimo, Kobakma and Yalengga. The genders of the seven Papuans allegedly killed in Prime are unknown.

One source has alleged 11,000 of which were killed in Jayawijaya and that 9,000 were killed in Wamena, Pyramid, Kurulu, Kelila, Bokondini and Kobakama, and a further 2,000 were killed in the eastern area of the highlands. It is also alleged that at least 4,000 were killed in Wosilimo which was at least 67% of Wosilimo's population at the time.

It is claimed that more than 1,000 OPM and TPNPB rebels and over 2,000 Indonesian soldiers were also killed. Given the asymmetrical nature of the conflict and the advanced military technology deployed by the TNI a claim of 2000 Indonesians killed alongside only 1000 military casualties among the separatist movements seems, at face value, to be very unlikely. One issue with the ongoing Papua Conflict is the widespread use of misinformation by all combatant factions, making it very hard to separate facts from propaganda.

One RAAF pilot Flt. Lt. Ralph Nigel Keith Taylor also reportedly died during the campaign in a helicopter accident.

Total number of confirmed civilian casualties by district, sex and age.
District	Deaths	Sex			Age								
District	Deaths	Male	Female	Unknown	< 12 Mth.	1-10	11-20	21-30	31-40	41-50	51-60	> 60	Unknown
Bolakme	620	474	146	0	0	22	66	79	58	158	75	162	0
Ibele	111	71	40	0	7	13	15	11	16	8	22	19	0
Central Ibele	62	55	7	0	0	0	4	2	16	27	13	0	0
Iluga	241	192	49	0	0	0	6	15	39	39	61	81	0
Kobakma	579	305	274	0	0	36	105	126	65	88	100	58	1
Makki	143	123	20	0	0	0	8	15	24	28	35	33	0
Napua	50	41	9	0	0	4	1	1	4	6	15	19	0
Paniai	56	52	4	0	0	1	1	3	2	0	0	0	49
Prime	138	122	9	7	0	30	24	11	29	29	14	1	0
Tagime	334	279	55	0	1	18	24	54	68	43	45	81	0
Wosilimo	835	557	278	0	9	24	47	101	106	149	115	284	0
Jayawijaya	187	160	27	0	0	8	15	17	51	63	33	0	0
Yalengga	665	484	181	0	9	44	41	50	92	101	147	181	0
Hetegima	8	8	0	0	0	0	0	0	3	4	1	0	0
Kurulu	117	94	23	0	0	8	12	15	32	31	19	0	0
Total	4,146	3,017	1,122	7	19	173	284	408	515	581	585	738	50

=== Names of the known victims ===
Bolakame
Ngu Wenda
Kenawen Wenda
Jusak Tabuni
Anis Murib
Limondo Murib
Pinaninuk Wenda
Apiret Wenda
Torat Wenda
Aten Tabuni
Malukgurik Wenda
Dinago Murid
Kendalek Wenda
Aiman Wenda
Ikar Wenda
Legarid Wenda
Tano Tabuni
Igendenake Wenda
Lindogon Wenda
Iwigilek Tabuni
Manda Tabuni
Balim Wenda
Anus Wenda
Iban Tabuni
Kelly Tabuni
Karek Wenda
Gokak Wenda
Natan Tabuni
Into Wenda
Andolek Murid
Daki Murid
Igedepuk Wenda
Yusak Tabuni
Anis Murib
Marnus Wenda
Igindenak Wenda
Barid Tabuni
Windik Tabuni
Yunus Tabuni
Italy Tabuni
Manus Tabuni
Lengge Tabuni
Bubuk Tabuni
Jiwi Tabuni
Linduwe Tabuni
Ongga Wenda
Nap Tabuni
Binduwe Tabuni
Wilem Wenda
Kiyu Wenda
Jila Tabuni
Kalep Tabuni
Ben Tabauni
Rapakat Tabuni
Isak Tabuni
Ruben Wenda
Koki Tabuni
Welek Wenda
Piter Wenda
Teno Wenda
Wimandi Tabuni
Tinggorak Tabuni
Legomo Tabuni
Yakop Tabuni
Tangkik Wenda
Mika Wenda
Amulok Tabuni
Buniak Tabuni
Inait Tabuni
Ukabir Tabuni
Gerek Wenda
Indu Tabuni
Kani Tabuni
Salam Wenda
Tarot Wenda
Asel Wenda
Sala Wenda
Yagia Tabuni
Ili Wenda
Gat Tabuni
Isak Wenda
Marinur Tabuni
Luan Gombo
Bakwi Gombo
Kewe Gombo
Tuwaneker Gombo
Awanma Gombo
Mewagi Gomba
Uma Gombo
Awelekma Gombo
Tonur Gombo
Jarius Gombo
Berius Gombo
Dan Gombo
Tagola Gombo
Kena Gombo
Inior Karoba
Babuk Karoba
Tani Tabuni
Andar Wenda
Kiwi Gombo
Tageam Gombo
Kolawe Gombo
Arugi Tabuni
Amok Tabuni
Eremet Tabuni
Wawa Tabuni
Enawo Wenda
Polo Tabuni
Timbe Tabuni
Wendep Tabuni
Banak Wenda
Jigi Wenda
Mirikmo Wenda
Biam Tabuni
Simion Tabuni
Tanden Wenda
Anas Tabuni
Nambo Tabuni
Iwan Tabuni
Nawo Tabuni
Munim Tabuni
Herman Jukwa
Juli Jikwa
Martemu Wenda
Nitap Wenda
Pogor Tabuni
Gagani Tabuni
Wunulek Tabuni
Tawolek Tabuni
Wanoak Tabuni
Kali Wenda
Wiragi Wenda
Panus Wenda
Guna Wenda
Ndale Wenda
Lume Wenda
Entawen Wenda
Marin Wenda
Lakaru Tabuni
Akombo Tabuni
Pinik Tabuni
Konep Wenda
Tepi Karoba
Painus Tabuni
Haman Wenda
Simson Tabuni
Johan Tabuni
Turarek Gombo
Moter Wenda
Jan Wenda
Mutani Wenda
Kiningka Wenda
Kopale Tabuni
Yanggu Wenda
Amitok Tabuni
Andinom Tabuni
Petrus Tabuni
Yesaya Tabuni
Munak Tabuni
Nioen Tabuni
Elius Wenda
Pelius Wenda
Natalis Tabuni
Ombalek Tabuni
Apit Wenda
Kenaben Wenda
Lili Wenda
Nagulek Tabuni
Bumbu Tabuni
Abokani Wenda
Yinawina Wenda
Lamu Tabuni
Analok Wenda
Awanok Murib
Wilenius Wenda
Wakugarak Tabuni
Engalaganak Tabuni
Laganik Tabuni
Ambole Wenda
Tumbuh Wenda
Wuri Wenda
Kupali Tabuni
Tekmende Wenda
Dinago Wenda
Imanonga Tabuni
Wungen Tabuni
Wulenius Wenda
Penius Wenda
Demilina Wenda
Wume Tabuni
Tomina Tabuni
Tagap Tabuni
Alimbi Wenda
Mesis Tabuni
Pina Wenda
Ekina Wenda
Yanege Wenda
Yane Wenda
Mbogot Tabuni
Diminguga Wenda
Wambuli Wenda
Yuwogwe Wenda
Painge Tabuni
Dena Tabuni
Enyaben Wenda
Molagi Tabuni
Merin Wenda
Deri Tabuni
Def Wenda
Watuwuk Wenda
Ambugunik Wenda
Tisa Tabuni
Toni Wenda
Yona Tabuni
Tamara Tabuni
Garek Wenda
Torina Tabuni
Iyaro Jikwa
Daud Jikwa
Bayok Tabuni
Eli Tabuni
Yusup Tabuni
Kornele Tabuni
Peyo Jikwa
Tina Jikwa
Tangke Tabuni
Masmur Tabuni
Agamiri Tabuni
Enius Jikwa
Marthen Tabuni
Nauk Jikwa
Kole Jikwa
Komangge Tabuni
Sepanuk Jikwa
Agani Tabuni
Motogarek Jikwa
Mutu Jikwa
Illilek Jikwa
Ateger Tabuni
Jawarak Jikwa
Iriani Jikwa
Biok Jikwa
Akenuk Jikwa
Akwarek Wanimbo
Jokone Wanimbo
Kolaganem Wanimbo
Idon Jikwa
Jipet Jikwa
Tomat Tabuni
Mendek Jikwa
Wanduke Jikwa
Mandimaleke Jikwa
Ben Jikwa
Benyamin Jikwa
Roti Jikwa
Ayam Jikwa
Koreke Jikwa
Bakuwarek Jikwa
Babaga Tabuni
Oratak Tabuni
Juliana Jikwa
Tolian Jikwa
Gamir Wanimbo
Kiwarek Jikwa
Eogarek Jikwa
Amok Jikwa
Balele Jikwa
Wunume Jikwa
Asap Jikwa
Ruben Pagawak
Ugunambit Tabuni
Padeam Tabuni
Melawirike Tabuni
Lelenggun Tabuni
Doan Tabuni
Kongkama Tabuni
Gad Wanimbo
Gigimunu Jikwa
Pogarigin Tabuni
Tugiwark Wenda
Welesi Jikwa
Niwinik Tabuni
Ambomelek Jikwa
Gelana Jikwa
Gubarom Tabuni
Ondoaret Jikwa
Woneni Jikwa
Solan Jikwa
Amili Tabuni
Jensdok Wenda
Langken Jikwa
Lingkobe Tabuni
Titak Tabuni
Tamban Tabuni
Jabukur Tabuni
Tualuan Tabuni
Gigarikban Jikwa
Hundupuk Tabuni
Ponus Tabuni
Togo Tabuni
Mela Tabuni
Ganumi Tabuni
Kebuken Jikwa
Kandi Jikwa
Bawir Tabuni
Gingirak Jikwa
Amir Jikwa
Dani Jikwa
Timbonarek Tabuni
Kimbin Tabuni
Jugumbonok Tabuni
Putih Jikwa
Merah Jikwa
Wimiak Jikwa
Oak Jikwa
Petrus Jikwa
Eralige Tabuni
Kiranak Tabuni
Aguaret Tabuni
Jesimin Jikwa
Opgunik Tabuni
Eogarekke Tabuni
Enamelak
Gele Tabuni
Din Tabuni
Etambe Jikwa
Orige Jikwa
Rabu Jikwa
Eduarek Jikwa
Danligarek Jikwa
Danuwarek Jikwa
Terginir Wanimbo
Romat Wanimbo
Tender Tabuni
Wulume Jikwa
Kelangge Jikwa
Teban Tabuni
Wuhlu Tabuni
Nambelak Tabuni
Nano Jikwa
Pugi Jikwa
Mehuru Jikwa
Elina Jikwa
Jugaris Tabuni
Girogon Tabuni
Sangkur Jikwa
Apwonok Jikwa
Kortak Wanimbo
Gebesa Jikwa
Jelugiwarak Jikwa
Jem Jikwa
Genarek Jikwa
Genareke Wanimbo
Geme Jikwa
Lokhe Jikwa
Urang Jikwa
Tilawaga Jikwa
Toleme Jikwa
Eragorake Jikwa
Kalobuluk Jikwa
Mepaik Jikwa
Waniur Jikwa
Perainuk Jikwa
Duarek Tabuni
Naggura Jikwa
Lukas Tabuni
Ober Wanimbo
Kiban Tabuni
Kibabuluke Jikwa
Esin Jikwa
Etina Jikwa
Oskar Jikwa
Panage Jikwa
Lewi Jikwa
Mariana Jikwa
Das Jikwa
Timon Jikwa
Simon Jikwa
Urudina Wanimbo
Labuk Wanimbo
Jam Tabuni
Angone Tabuni
Bernus Tabuni
Mimagi Jikwa
Gubi Jikwa
Jona Tabuni
Nomite Tabuni
Wimeak Tabuni
Tomlina Jikwa
Tlomina Jikwa
Longkopangkin Jikwa
Nandukke Jikwa
Ilamina Jikwa
Imia Jikwa
Tewengorak Jikwa
Kanier Tabuni
Mananuk Jikwa
Dita Jiwa
Desa Tabuni
Maju Jikwa
Igokinggen Tabuni
Kendep Tabuni
Bendera Tabuni
Loh Tabuni
Guruk Tabuni
Inat Tabuni
Tupu Jikwa
Jupu Jikwa
Koliur Jikwa
Kahli Jikwa
Wia Gomba
Wangkowoloke Jikwa
Wonok Jikwa
Potini Komba
Kaligali Tabuni
Gorenak Tabuni
Gerelis Tabuni
Arimareke Jikwa
Alomaris Jikwa
Wolona Jikwa
Yunus Jikwa
Wopegak Jikwa
Patike Tabuni
Wogon Tabuni
Totandur Jikwa
Ambilek Tabuni
Enamben Jikwa
Eambenale Jikwa
Omameleke Jikwa
Milik Jikwa
Namit Jikwa
Walagerek Jikwa
Danume Tabuni
Wnembirak Jikwa
Mauwareke Jikwa
Kanage Jikwa
Weri Jikwa
Guwarok Wenda
Maluk Wenda
Magawu Wenda
Yumago Wenda
Bambe Tabuni
Golaria Tabuni
Mulunit Wenda
Kumoge Tabuni
Eberit Tabuni
Yewit Wenda
Garabkwe Wenda
Eletuar Wenda
Watimar Wenda
Palat Wenda
Pirorogan Tabuni
Genarek Wenda
Gilek Wenda
Ayiman Wenda
Amolek Tabuni
Iban Tabuni
Wenaoke Wenda
Amile Wenda
Nabo Tabuni
Ogandabit Wenda
Dale Wenda
Mali Tauni
Onda Wenda
Domius Wenda
Tenit Tabuni
Bonage Wenda
Enganu Wenda
Wakunukwe Tabuni
Tabingen Wenda
Ogarokwe Tabuni
Dianak Tabuni
Martinus Wenda
Wam Wenda
Mimin Tabuni
Eraluge Tabuni
Welina Tabuni
Obet Jikwa
Taborogon Tabuni
Banarok Tabuni
Kenanggen Jikwa
TIngginu Jikwa
Obaneke Tabuni
Obaguni Jikwa
Yima Tabuni
Waribi Jikwa
Yibula Tabuni
Panggi Tabuni
Orelek Wenda
Pamin Wenda
Palu Wenda
Lekwe Wenda
Pinde Wenda
Lut Tabuni
Tuburina Jikwa
Wupuwok Wenda
Gone Tabuni
Galuk Tabuni
Giyongek Wenda
Mala Tabuni
Unlikwe Wenda
Tabolek Tabuni
Toborogon Wenda
Tubulek Wenda
Ambigira Tabuni
Nenganak Tabuni
Legalek Wenda
Letagon Wenda
Sem Tabuni
Sabin Tabuni
Arimina Tabuni
Derbe Tabuni
Berekunik Tabuni
Bernas Tabuni
Gogani Tabuni
Eteregarak Tabuni
Eregina Tabuni
Terinda Jikwa
Rutina Tabuni
Kele Tabuni
Mesi Tabuni
Ason Tabuni
Bidimit Wenda
Mondekubuk Wenda
Aranu Tabuni
Mamalage Wenda
Kanipaga Tabuni
Tita Jikwa
Kagan Tabuni
Porom Jikwa
Tamiyage Jikwa
Arinabuk Murib
Piyakwe Tabuni
Enos Tabuni
Kotor Tabuni
Nani Wenda
Markus Tabuni
Yomina Tabuni
Kartina Tabuni
Inarnggelo Tabuni
Naulek Tabuni
Tenden Wenda
Marnus Tabuni
Tala Wenda
Ombale Tabuni
Wibangen Tabuni
Windek Tabuni
Manur Tabuni
Munakaru Tabuni
Italy Tabuni
Yunus Tabuni
Yoran Tabuni
Kwarobak Medlama
Amitor Tabuni
Lapar Tabuni
Yungorak Tabuni
Legamok Tabuni
Winandi Tabuni
Ongowa Medlama
Otius Tabuni
Yilaga Tabuni
Kuburan Wenda
Yulisa Wenda
Likwe Gombo
Wakunik Tabuni
Inoruman Tabuni
Balime Tabuni
Jitarip Tabuni
Andinom Tabuni
Nober Medlama
Mato Medlama
Yibinalok Tabuni
Yibi Tabuni
Amulek Tabuni
Nabenak Wenda
Bindue Tabuni
Dorkas Wenda
Ben Wenda
Wenabu Tabuni
Pitiruk Tabuni
Mendin Tabuni
Perius Tabuni
Tuan Wenda
Mbanapa Tabuni
Lakilek Wenda
Teno Wenda
Binike Tabuni
Abenalek Tabuni
Isak Tabuni
Tara Tabuni
Uruben Wenda
Letis Tabuni
Mince Wenda
Anis Wenda
Epince Tabuni
Onambok Tabuni
Wenwe Wenda
Gas Wenda
Yota Wenda
Yakag Tabuni
Naguron Medlama
Hebekke Wenda
Erta Wenda
Eran Medlama
Yumubak Wenda
Tekani Medlama
Opi Tabuni
Wugabit Tabuni
Yali Medlam
Tabo Medlama
Inenggulek Tabuni
Pilakwe Gombo
Goro Wenda

Ibele
Akur Yelipele
Yokilek Yelipele
Watlarik Kaloli
Olarogo Kalolik
Mesalekma Meaga
Jigirok
Hunik Matuan
Lagoner Murip
Sapira Murip
Woragin Murup
Merina Matuan
Juliana Murip
Ekanonknok Meage
Mikha Murip
Wiarok Meaga
Kabunareka Hilapok
Lince Meaga
Nagolimo Kaliknie
Obakahu Kaliknie
Olarogo Kaliknie
Mayuken Meaga
Ikihago Meaga
Kalopalek Meaga
Okakarok Meaga
Wisigine Wuka
Inanewelek Elpore
Hubula Meaga
Julince Elpore
Wamilan Wuka
Hiwene Wuka
Parnur Wuka
Sekanorahe Wuka
Awurage Wuka
Guaken Kogoya
Heakama Wentikpo
Asisorlek Mosip
Kobatla Elopore
Jalipika Hiluka
Ruben Dabili
Dalok Dabili
Fokorogon Wenda
Wamokodek Hilapok
Oakilelek Hilapok
Wulosek Kosay
Worokos Hilapok
Jiligike Wetipo
Diren Wetipo
Lagun Wetipo
Kabunarekma Hilapok
Yewarek Wetipo
Yendokhogo Wetipo
Milik Wetipo
Wugobik Wetipo
Mewarik Wetipo
Heakhibabik Wetipo
Martinus Wetipo
Salopiluk Wetipo
Nukiagi Wetipo
Wumediluk Hilapok
Korlo Hilapok
Uterek Hilapok
Halodek Hilapok
Amiladek Hilapok
Aipok Hilapok
Mago Hilapok
Hunik Hilapok
Guaken Kogoya
Erlehe Hilapok
Waisabuke Kogoya
Nataniel Hisage
Matluke Kosay
Obahaluk Kalolik
Olarogo Kalolik
Lokogama Murib
Yulianus Murib
Yakidek Jelipele
Dirlu Yoman
Felelek Wetipo
Salogopiluk Hiluka
Iomeke Kalolik
Kemiri Hiluka
Kudi Wetipo
Awuwarek Wetipo
Jirluoge Mosip
Kolapiloke Hiluka
Yerina Hiluka
Halodek Dabili
Horonwareke Hilapok
Erage Hilapok
Liabuok Kalolik
Bisidabuke Kaloik
Ekayolekma Mosip
Mearogo Hiluka
Aburarema Kalolik
Obahakerek Hilapok
Inapidek Mosip
Inarendekhe Mosip
Berogo Kalolik
Selokhe Hiluka
Mamoge Hiluka
Mereba Hiluka
Moneke Hiluk
Isalaku Heluka
Elisabet Heluka
Atopiluke Hiluka
Horege Hiluka
Bisi Mosip
Wumilage Mosip
Hurlil Heiluka
Yugusek Wetipo
Bisidabu Kalolik

Iluga
Aigae Kombo
Alukmo Kombo
Sirima Kombo
Kombo Kombo
Kula Karoba
Jalimo Kombo
Akimo Kombo
Wonalek Kombo
Wulagik Kombo
Konai Uaga
Pika Kombo
Salo Togoli
Eladin Togoli
Muligima Uaga
Sularogo Mabel
Lele Mabel
Ninarik Gombo
Guluke Gombo
Karoleke Gombo
Ninarike Uaga
Mali Uaga
Biri Kenelak
Kuragi Pabingka
Tiluk Togoli
Sengkan Togoli
Babuge Aud
Lagide Mabel
Agakolek Mabel
Sirige Mabel
Onggage Mabel
Olige Aud
Ogerek Aud
Wiaruk Gombo
Ilabu Gobo
Soyabu Entama
Awogombik Uaga
Nenggarek Uanga
Jawela Uaga
Ilangangot Uanga
Sogiyarek Entama
Lagalodek Numpo
Tembalek Gombo
Yosam Kenelak
Ambilek Uaga
Agat Aud
Wolok Uaga
Laburue Gombo
Yabugima Melamo
Kepitam Uaga
Agabuk Uaga
Hugunarek Gombo
Iyok
Mutok Uaga
Kirenak Uaga
Jakibirak Uanga
Tamuki Melamo
Agali Melamo
Jeledek Melamo
Sagatnem Kenelak
Liluwali Kenelak
Jalige Gombo
Isak Aud
Seno Aud
Sinikama Aud
Wulagaluk Doga
Anegomo Aud
Tinus Aud
Magama Aud
Nopen Aud
Jeperina Aud
Nilamud Aud
Mabelke Mabel
Wule Mabel
Sangani Singkilon
Domiarek Mabel
Irigali Aud
Koroge Aud
Liana Aud
Nugi Uaga
Jiwilik Uaga
Logogin Wandikbo
Birok Gombo
Walma Uaga
Narugaluk Aud
Kalauga Aud
Wia Aud
Lae Aud
Dingaga Aud
Yusup Aud
Junus Aud
Konagi Aud
Muliak Aud
Akuniagun Aud
Minggage Uaga
Omode Togoli
Luam Uaga
Pongkiluk Kuligaga
Menderogo AUd
Agodeke Gombo
Geaginabik Mabel
Yoneragi Togoli
Kutlake Wanimbo
Niralek Logo
Sindiwaga Logo
Lori Logo
Babuma Entama
Stelok Aud
Amos Aud
Alo Togoli
Lagaligin Togoli
Eli Togoli
Apotmalorek Aud
Kunduk Aud
Bera Gombo
Damok Mabel
Degagunem Mabel
Iran Gombo
Juengen Gombo
Pirokpalek Gombo
Lako Kombo
Weriak Korloge
Wagagulek Logo
Kursi Aud
Pelerogo Kenelak
Enggale Logo
Dawoke Mabel
Gomer Walela
Walage Walela
Werago Aud
Tugiwaga Aud
Iriwaga Kuliagal
Dampama Kenelak
Wangkolega Uanga
Daniel Wandik
Karogo Huliagal
Gasper Mabel
Lerok Entama
Luter Gombo
Deramas Gombo
Matkut Mabel
Wololola Mabel
Jap Kundigagal
Senden Kudigagal
Karele Mabel
Apiud Kuligagal
Yoria Kuligaga
Muke Entama
Iriser Logo
Baege Logo
Wutlage Mabel
Koreke Walela
Titus Walela
Pika Walela
Kubayage Nompo
Bunla Aud
Welepma Elosak
Kiloma Tigilom
Tipuli Kenelak
Pontarek Gombo
Awelalu Melama
Pukali Melama
Hofatnem Gombo
Malon Gombo
Pase Mabel
Petru Mabel
Alaluge Uanga
Onggo Mabel
Ambungganek Mabel
Kaliagalek Elosak
Kiogelek Mabel
Kimolek Walela
Angkunmo Uaga
Tigadeke Aud
Kilogalek Aud
Anegali Aud
Kumunge Gombo
Ioguluge Mabel
Unggohak Uaga
Ilimporok Uaga
Isaima Aud
Wemalupuk Aud
Ilagege Logo
Miyon Gombo
Perima Uaga
Yante Uaga
Inut Uaga
Analia Gombo
Wosi Gombo
Gulangala Wantik
Kilalak Entama
Karana Mabel
Ilek Entama
Nagigilek Entama
Elola Mabel
Gabelek Mabel
Liliwu Entama
Inginama Mabel
Kaya Mabel
Doragomente Mabel
Kolage Mabel
Apmalema Gombo
Perenut Togoli
Kelom Togoli
Wilelu Mabel
Sarah Mabel
Wutlage Mabel
Sike Aud
Lagunem Gombo
Pogorogo Aud
Kakset Aud
Wokharik Aud
Tungareke Aud
Werat Mabel
Manggiga Aud
Moli Uanga
Tobiri Uaga
Gombuaga Uaga
Buruk Huliagal
Lena Gombo
Antobuga Uaga
Toge Aud
Kaimende Aud
Kaya Aud
Kiwik Aud
Ange Aud
Weneane Aud
Kula Aud
Ninomluok Mabel
Pangolabu Mabel
Tiewaga Mabel
Imba Uaga
Nagaloke Entama
Mutok Aud
Kalet Elosak
Lakalodek Gombo

Kobakma

Makki
Wirabinawok Wenda
Pitri Wenda
Wanduk Kogoya
Dinaok Wenda
Delen Kogoya
Nip Wenda
Inggup Wenda
Lero Wenda
Eyongen Wenda
Piganawok Wenda
Kotor Wenda
Air Kogoya
Kotan Kogoya
Timo Kogoya
Keyagirak Kogoya
Iturma Kogoya
Morago Wenda
Yiwome Wenda
Yunius Wenda
Nagenggen Wenda
Ounde Wenda
Tinur Wenda
Pupurenak Kogoya
Waena Wenda
Parim Kogoya
Tanukwe Kogoya
Jigiruok Wenda
Obambok Kogoya
Eringok Kogoya
Panagaga Kogoya
Dumbanik Wenda
Obate Wenda
Naik Wenda
Amili Wenda
Jigirik Kogoya
Panus Wenda
Yop Wenda
Napius Kogoya
Watuk Kogoya
Burume Kogoya
Elius Wenda
Marinus Wenda
Pano Wenda
Kandor Wenda
Lewo Kogoya
Okien Wenda
Babu Kogoya
Menanggen Kogoya
Abelek Kogoya
Eri Kogoya
Piter Kogoya
Yukar Kogoya
Endy Kogoya
Karubaga Kogoya
Guber Kogoya
Taun Kogoya
Owelek Wenda
Boas Wenda
Abugulek Kogoya
Mabuk Wenda
Piragen Wenda
Molama Kogoya
Tenagup Kogoya
Gum Kogoya
Dundu Kogoya
Tambariak Kogoya
Gerad Kogoya
Nandi Kogoya
Samuel Kogoya
Nanorik Kogoya
Yinunggime Kogoya
Bonabat Kogota
Toganini Kogoya
Nikolas Kogoya
Kipenus Kogoya
Daondy Kogoya
Piton Kogoya
Bater Kogoya
Talerowo Kogoya
Timion Kogoya
Tigiranok Wenda
Walo Wenda
Korneles Wenda
Gomer Wenda
Atier Wenda
Enius Wenda
Saniel Wenda
Menius Wenda
Isingrin Kogoya
Ben Kogoya
Benius Kogoya
Kerenus Kogoya
Denius Kogoya
Nibik Kogoya
Yumbianduk Kogoya
Elias Kogoya
Anongongok Kogoya
Engipunok Kogoya
Pugaruwi Kogoya
Nupume Wenda
Nambenak Kogoya
Yiluk Kogoya
Bur Wenda
Bugulek Kogoya
Tepuwok Kogoya
Dowan Kogoya
Ambirigik Kogoya
Nas Wenda
Tepanus Wenda
Dimer Wenda
Yari Kogoya
Amer Kogoya
Gat Wenda
Inekumendek Wenda
Karok Kogoya
Dinus Kogoya
Wingkingen Kogoya
Mepelek Wenda
Ogami Wenda
Yan Wenda
Tardin Kogoya
Tipaga Wenda
Titus Wenda
Agakap Wenda
Wilson Kogoya
Melak Wenda
Omomelek Kogoya
Managanduk Kogoya
Biyopir Wenda
Lepinus Wenda
Yurar Wenda
Opanus Wenda
Opinus Wenda
Milik Kogoya
Kirigi Kogoya
Pindier Wenda

Napua
Walarik Kalolik
Akus Asso
Ekiabusak Elopore
Nagolikmo Yelipele
Mayuken Meage
Enleka Yelibele
Pate Asso
Konene Elopore
Nona Yelipele
Ekina Tabuni
Yawiakom Murib
Yatilek Yelipele
Obakahaluk Yelipele
Eman Asso
Yirokunik Tabuni
Mesalekma Tabuni
Logonogogume Murib
Ekanokomeken Murib
Olarogo Kalolik
Werigin Murib
Laki Tabuni
Wiyarak Murib
Mika Tabuni
Yagat Tabuni
Sepele Yelipele
Urisagi Lani
Heletok Yelipele
Talapake Kuan
Omanen Elopore
Papua Yelipele
Ipon Asso
Weriok Yelipele
Uruarik Asso
Helamok Elepere
Iten Yelipele
Tuarik Asso
Tiren Wenda
Tabuge Murib
Tariana Murib
Eripuguk Yelipele
Weneruk Elopore
Walsak Murib
Rambulak Murib
Warik Murib
Eliana Murib
Meriana Murib
Berina Yelipele
Mugutuk Murib
Molek Asso
Wandepuk Yelipele

Paniai
Pilemon Wakerwa
Talinplik Magai
Felix Tabuni
Thadeu Tabuni
Nalogolan Deleme
Wopawa Aim
David Magay
Musa Magay
Daud Ongomang
Samuel Kiwik
Thomas Dolame
Boenai Dolame
Egin Aim
Nate Doleme
Newenmutme Uamang
Simon Dekmen
Jan Kalarengame
Yopi Kogoya
Kugame Kogoya
Jonas Wakerwa
Nico Dekmen
Kaipas Dekmen
Daud Lokbere
Lukas Alom
Mbingga Weya
Yoby T. Kogoya
Ismael Kogoya
Mampres Dekmen
Oktobianus Aim
Maria Aim
Mariance Alomang
Maria Alomang
Matias Kiwak
Beaneko Dekme
Pit Angaibak
Wangokolan Magal
Jakbus Agaibak
Elias Onawame
Emelius Metawarol
Julian Dekme
Kaipas Magal
Bosko Tugumol
Decky Manungkang
Ekal Dekme
Selvius Watawarol
Jakobus Wataworol
Tepiar Aim
Marinus Magai
Abeta kwalik
Yusak Kalaragame
Thomas Kemong
Serabut Kemong
Anak Surabut Kemong
Ibu Serabut Kemong
Kuak Begal Magai
Kornelis Magay

Prime
Turaken Wenda
Wes Wanimbo
Wewo Wanimbo
Piter Wakerwa
Pilas Wakerwa
Pendekuban Wenda
Yangkilek Wanimbo
Bimo Wakerwa
Kobawi Wanimbo
Nanummarak Wanimbo
Ruben Kogoya
Wurawinabok Wenda
Paulus Wanimbo
Nelius Wanimbo
Danius Wanimbo
Depson Murib
Juko Wanimbo
Pendage Wanimbo
Molamendek Wenda
Peaka Wanimbo
Prewak Kogoya
Marius Kogoya
Kunume Kogoya
Timu Wenda
Ameneri Wakerwa
Mujuk Wanimbo
Enduar Wakerwa
Dias Wanimbo
Siroakage Wakerwa
Es Wanimbo
Soleman Wakerwa
Maes Wakerwa
Prenok Wanimbo
Meskina Wanimbo
Semuae Wanimbo
Das Wakerwa
Yoram Wakerwa
Etiman Wanumbo
Adolop Wanimbo
Yosias Wanimbo
Yepen Wakerwa
Warnius Wakerwa
Bobi Wakerwa
Tengeker Wakerwa
Yarogup Tabuni
Dis Wakerwa
Obet Wanimbo
Luis Wanimbo
Jigirik Wanimbo
Dirion Wakerwa
Labusiam Wakerwa
Wetinur Wakera
Jahir Wanimbo
Maikel Wanimbo
Yanus Wanimbo
Kornelis Wakerwa
Times Wanimbo
Elias Wanimbo
Usman Wanimbo
Ely Wanimbo
Pirman Wanimbo
Nagu Wanimbo
Panus Wanimbo
Efius Wanimbo
Demianus Walkerwa
Isman Murib
Rony Wanimbo
Ony Wanimbo
Pito Wakerwa
Lindina Wanimbo
Apinus Wenda
Mince Wakerwa
Elius Wakerwa
Mikael Wakerwa
Kelina Wanimbo
Rudy Wakerwa
Elon Wakerwa
Es Wakerwa
Saul Wakerwa
Eprom Wakerwa
Lonerius Wakerwa
Disko Wakerwa
Jance Wakerwa
Taworina Wanimbo
Amiariri Wakerwa
Jawi Wenda
Napia Wanimbo
Geriak Wanimbo
Mutiur Wanimbo
Benyamin Wanimbo
Gemelogoma Wakerwa
Naweaken Wakerwa
Endius Wanimbo
Bos Wanimbo
Sanra Meaga
Jundin Wakerwa
Tumbuni Wanimbo
Timonggen Wanimbo
Pileiman Wanimbo
Ogolengke Wanimbo
Tabo Wanimbo
Tagale Wanimbo
Kenikban Wanimbo
Hogosea Wanimbo
Geringga Wanimbo
Gemban Wanimbo
Danus Wanimbo
Denus Wakerwa
Melkin Wanimbo
Moti Wenda
Gunggen Wanimbo
Naganom Wanimbo
Bogombi Wanimbo
Justinus Murib
Beny Waker
Peluru Waker
Kolingginik Waker
Tiruan Wanimbo
Kiomarak Wakerwa
Liawuringga Wanimbo
Kape Wanimbo
Dekius Wanibo
Dopius Wanimbo
Yos Wanimbo
Kandus Wakerwa
Melius Wanimbo
Tolina Wanimbo
Kostan Wanimbo
Ermer Tabuni
Ngu Wenda
Ewelek Tabuni
Ogum Murib
Yusak Tabuni
Anis Tabuni
Wulepengka Wenda

Tagime

Wosilimo

Jayawijaya
Elale Asso
Ekiawusak Asso
Jekeak Wetapo
Jonas Mulama
Elia Matuan
Pawi Asso
Olarogo Lokobal
Elisago Lani
Palika Meaga
Kilunaga Meaga
Natok Walilo
Siroba Huby
Wolok Meaga
Owasiakek Kosay
Heaka Jiwili
Weakhelema Wilil
Walima Elopore
Yaro Kilungga
Obamelak Kilungga
Guburi Wenda
Kalep Wenda
Lapan Wenda
Palok Kilungga
Jutalek Kilungga
Alogonik Kilungga
Karumwarek Wenda
Thomas Wenda
Arina Wandikbo
Amialek Kenelak
Amilek Aud
Yalenggen Aud
Wilem Aud
Yasak Tabuni
Merius Wenda
Magame Medlam
Wanggol Wandikbo
Wangkunggogdek Karoba
Wolodlek Uaga
Buwon Kombo
Bimpel Bogomis
Yobisirigi Berendam
Bakeam Kobanek
Boba Thago
Mor Libuk
Wimgarek Gombo
Bagali Karoba
Tirim Kombo
Yonggiare Aud
Telebaga Kenelak
Wakunggolek Kenelak
Uegen Kenelak
Jabugima Medlama
Erimbo Jikwa
Weyaninuk Kogoya
Yance Gombo
Tamina Gombo
Kagaruan Jikwa
Wapunuk Tabuni
Yakop Jikwa
Malinus Jikwa
Dendogi Togotli
Wayway Logo
Selok Daby
Yalyamen Logo
Kimdalok Mabel
Lalogoluk Logo
Turagen Wenda
Wewo Wanimbo
Obet Tabuni
Aburlek Alua
Dekapul Surabut
Tiknagale Wetipo
Wekipuk Kosay
Wene Kosay
Asupalek Surabut
Hiwihuleken Dabi
Amiladek Wetipo
Hibinama babika
Isopalek Kurisi
Aleak Parageye
Haranto Doga
Walagin Entama
Yogotulek Mabel
Mio Paragaye
Kaluk Entama
Kabuge Surabut
Nilikmo Wetipo
Harodoke Wantik
Ikuluke Wetipo
Gentan Himan
Helemule Himan
Komalia Marian
Abusage Wetipo
Isaima Himan
Ipalodek Pabika
Yongien Walela
Nalonggalek Walela
Imapuluk Mabel
Ilik Uaga
Wowarike Wetipo
Isigen Wilil
Apdekma Elosak
Waewu Mabel
Pilimagare
Iyotmutluk Huluaga
Sup Mabel
Anepalek Doga
Samuel Wetipo
Pilipus Mabel
Arkila Kosy
Motodek Mabel
Iluga Doga
Obalabele Kosy
Selok Daby
Eya Jiwili
Imabo Entama
Sanglek Itlay
Yekemili Alua
Aboknaluk Logo
Nitnalok Logo
Higarega Logo
Hiluge Mabel
Surima Hiluka
Mulia Mabel
Nasinen Himan
Werago Surabut
Palimake Haluk
Kontikge Dabi
Alagamlek Mabel
Tugulupuk Aroma
Yagabuluk Doga
Wilago Wetipo
Isak Logo
Paulus Logo
Lapokima Hilapok
Watlarik Lani
Mulinai Himan
Kusogo Huby

Yalengga
Adogolik Wanimbo
Bumangken Tabuni
Galede Wandikbo
Naftali Tabuni
Marnus Wenda
Tugiyak Tabuni
Enerasi Kolago
Kanipinik Tabuni
Wandikke Wandikbo
Lukigin Wandikbo
Yonatan Tabuni
Kodekna Tabuni
Laban Aud
Kalep Aud
Podok Kilungga
Togona Tabuni
Yugak Tabuni
Tagi Kenelak
Linggobok Kenelak
Nalipu Kilungga
Alius Kilungga
Giyungga Gini
Amenagagirik Tabuni
Nagame Tabuni
Amidek Aud
Teanoma Aud
Kuwaigwe Wanimbo
Belarek Tabuni
Kwege Tabuni
Kolanggomarek Uaga
Dambela Mendlama
Peruni Togotli
Teweri Togotli
Wenimugunri Togotli
Dambe mabel
Limengga Wenda
Skmankali Mabel
Wulepengga Wenda
Keyakagak Wenda
Gumedak Jigibalok
Jilukmo Gombo
Gedela Gombo
Tomaginik Kenelak
Yabukade Kenelak
Atodek Wandikbo
Thobiat Inggibal
Inggiagorek Inggibal
Gonunom Inggibal
Gedapale Arumbu
Wulem Aud
Motes Metlama
Pugutni Tabuni
Yusak Wenda
Pilemon Wenda
Elambi Wenda
Goriwalo Tabuni
Jimengga Wenda
Omunggareke Tabuni
Tegagungnik Togaotli
Wumpuok Tabuni
Piliput Wenda
Tendem Gombo
Simiyon Kilungga
Tong Aud
Eletegudek Inggibal
Takius Inggibal
Iluktalek Kilungga
Enago Tabuni
Purapume Tabuni
Uga Tabuni
Wunagambak Tabuni
Jinanggapak Tabuni
Kewolok Tabuni
Oben Tabuni
Wilem Tabuni
Bayanggube Wandikbo
Karogwe Kilungga
Bumereke Inggibal
Imampo Inggibal
Dukunan Wandikbo
Garogomarek Medlama
Tumbanili Wandikbo
Lenggarogon Wandikbo
Jhon Wandikbo
Etap Wandikbo
Inggibaga Wandikbo
Lenguma Kenelak
Dekatuk Kenelak
Gilubaga Wandikbo
Nugatuk Wandikbo
Obami Wandikbo
Wenepagadek Medlama
Wodoal Medlama
Luaoguluk Arumba
Libaga Arumba
Imanggi Arumba
Agatnongga Arumba
Kirike Tabuni
Pendo Kenelak
Merius Wenda
Pilauga Uaga
Walam Kenelak
Ilungga Tabuni
Labuke Kenelak
Elina Wandikbo
Boas Wandikbo
Monggarayuk Kenelak
Jilukan Kenelak
Aikware Kenelak
Luter Gombo
Tebarek Gombo
Nengemo Wandikbo
Mael Wandikbo
Modamendek Kolago
Aikbu Kolagi
Yaro Kilungga
Obamedak Kilungga
Kebigirit Kilungga
Patigimo Kilungka
Konambiri Wandikbo
Uwakbaga Wandikbo
Wuriarek Wandikbo
Turima Wandikbo
Tengabit Wandikbo
Tambiko Wandikbo
Agadal Wandikbo
Wedemendek Wanimbo
Wimonggo Hilungka
Timendek Tabuni
Karoke Wandikbo
Ambiginik Wanimbo
Kalori Wandikbo
Dilogo Kenelak
Keleke Wandikbo
Gulaka Kilungga
Pilih Rogotli
Wenamburu Togotli
Ulina Kilungga
Kolomgala Togotli
Inarumende Wandikbo
Iamena Kilungka
Kaliamene Kilunggu
Matius Gombo
Yolikali Wandikbo
Wayama Kilungga
Dukuogoluk Kolago
Inaruwanti Kilunga
Omonggame Tabuni
Isak Togotli
Uwanagadek Togotli
Lolek Wandikbo
Wobarek Kutligagal
Bulaige Togotli
Agudek Wandikbo
Melekodek Wandikbo
Kolagadeken Wandikbo
Depaga Togotli
Taborogom Togotli
Ambiregen Wandikbo
Kongedekma Wandikbo
Butaganak Tanimbo
Golaluok Wandimbo
Wilem Wandikbo
Yohanes Wandikbo
Yotam Wandikbo
Woloareka Inggibal

Hetegima
Elale Asso
Ekiawusak Asso
Jekeak Wetapo
Jonas Mulama
Elias Matuan
Pawi Asso
Olarogo Lokobal
Elisago Lani

Central Ibele
Palika Meaga
Kliubaga Meaga
Natok Walilo
Siroba Huby
Wolok Meaga
Obet Tabuni
Kapame Tabuni
Akorodek Tabuni
Dukunan Wandikbo
Kayabagak Wenda
Yaro Kilungga
Obamelak Kilungga
Guburi Wenda
Kalep Wenda
Laban Wenda
Palok Kilungga
Jutalek Kilungga
Alogonik Kilungga
Tanama Kilungga
Karumwarek Wenda
Thomas Wenda
Arina Wandikbo
Amialek Kenelak
Amilek Aud
Yalenggen Wandikbo
Wilem Aud
Yasak Tabuni
Merius Wenda
Magame Medlam
Wanggol Wandikbo
Wangkunggodek Karoba
Wolodlek Uaga
Buwon Kombo
Bimpel Bogomis
Yobisirigi Berendam
Bakeam Kobanek
Boba Thago
Mor Libuk
Wimgarek Gombo
Bagali Karoba
Tirim Kombo
Tonggiare Aud
Telebaga Kenelak
Wakunggolek Kenelak
Uegen Kenelak
Jabugima Medlama
Erimbo Jikwa
Weyaninuk Kogoya
Yance Gomba
Tamina Gombo
Kagaruan Jikwa
Wapunuk Tabuno
Yakop Jikwa
Malinus Jikwa
Dendogi Togotli
Wayway Logo
Selok Daby
Yalyamen Logo
Kimdalok Mabel
Lalogoluk Logo
Turagen Wenda
Wewo Wanimbo

Kurulu
Aburlek Alua
Dekapul Surabut
Tiknagale Wetipo
Wekipuk Kosay
Wene Kosay
Asupalek Surabut
Hiwihuleken Dabi
Amiladek Wetipo
Hibinima Babika
Isopalek Kurisi
Aleak Parageye
Haranto Doga
Walagin Entama
Yogotulek Mabel
Mio Paragaye
Kaluk Entama
Kabuge Surabut
Nilikmo Wetipo
Harodoke Wantik
Ikuluke Wetipo
Hentan Himan
Jelemule Himan
Komalia Marian
Abusage Wetipo
Isaima Himan
Ipalodek Pabika
Yongien Walela
Nalonggalek Walela
Imapuluk Mabel
Ilik Uaga
Wowarike Wetipo
Ilukulu Wetipo
Isigen Wilil
Apdekma Elosak
Waewu Mabel
Pilimagare
Iyokmutluk Huluaga
Sup Mabel
Anepalek Doga
Samuel Wetipo
Pilipus Mabel
Arkila Kosy
Motodek Mabel
Iluga Doga
Obalabele Kosy
Selok Daby
Eya Jiwili
Imabo Entama
Sanglek Itlay
Yekemili Alua
Aboknaluk Logo
Nitnalok Logo
Higarega Logo
Hiluge Mabel
Surima Hiluka
Mulia Mabel
Nasinen Himan
Werago Surabut
Palimake Haluk
Kontikge Dabi
Alagamlek Mabel
Tugulupuk Aroma
Yagabuluk Doga
Wilago Wetipo
Isak Logo
Paulus Logo
Lapokima Hilapok
Watlarik Lani
Mulinai Himan
Kusogo Huby
Wilem Kosy
Nataniel Hisage
Kia Jiwili
Natok Jiwili
Waloken Alua
Hisuga Alua
Ilade Pawika
Watlarik Pawika
Saledek Alua
Lidu Alua
Abulik Wili
Iroko Alua
Umasebek Alua
Kitla Alua
Amokadek Alua
Paopiduk Alua
Hulinare Pabika
Alokoplikilik Alua
Oiadekendek Mabel
Antobiluk Aroba
Kula Paragaye
Hulinae Arop
Holansek Arop
Sega Pabika
Omasabek Doga
Yekenma Alua
Aneane Himan
Lani Wetipo
Opolidek Aroba
Wulikdal Mabel
Kulengga Wetipo
Puluk Wetipo
Mealuk Mabel
Alumbulu Surabut
Lolokuluk Surabut
Mokarak Wilil
Kerombolan Alua
Saguk Pabika
Ibolok Pabika
Lolo Pabika
Nagi Pabika
Nio Paragaye
Nasinem Himan
Tugidagalek Walila
Helo Doga
Helekeane Kosay
Heluselek Alua

== The Neglected Genocide ==
In 2013 the Asian Human Rights Commission and the Human Rights and Peace for Papua published The Neglected Genocide: Human Rights Abuses against Papuans in the Central Highlands, 1977-1978, which documents the accounts of the victims of the campaign. The names of the 4,146 known victims were also published in this report.
