= Forgotten Bird of Paradise =

2009 film by Dominic Brown

- Directed by: Dominic Brown
- Produced by: Dancing Turtle Films
- Release date: 21 September 2009 (Raindance Film Festival)
- Running time: 27 minutes
- Country: United Kingdom
- Language: English

Forgotten Bird of Paradise is a 2009 documentary film directed by British filmmaker Dominic Brown, about the struggle for independence being fought in the Indonesian region of West Papua. The film was shot undercover, and includes interviews with human rights victims and political prisoners, as well as footage of separatist guerrillas at their jungle stronghold.

== Production ==
Brown travelled and filmed in West Papua without the permission of the Indonesian authorities, putting himself in great danger. Brown reflected that on West Papua the situation was "like apartheid", and likened the transmigration program and anti-secession policies to "genocide".

== Content ==
The documentary features an interview conducted with Yusak Pakage, a high-profile West Papuan political prisoner recognised by Amnesty International as a prisoner of conscience. He is currently serving a ten-year prison sentence for raising the West Papuan flag during a ceremony in 2004. The interview was recorded in secret by Brown during a hospital visit where Pakage was receiving treatment for torture.

There is also footage from a National Liberation Army (TPN) camp led by one of the armed resistance leaders, General Goliath Tabuni. In addition, the documentary provides viewers with an insight into recent developments on the international arena towards West Papuan self-determination, including the launch of the International Parliamentarians for West Papua.

== Film and television ==
- BBC Newsnight, UK (12-minute feature) – March 2009
- ABC News, Australia (7-minute report) – September 2009
- Channel 4 News, UK (short segment used for report on West Papua) – October 2010
- Isolated - 2014. Clips feature in this documentary that follows a group of surfers who set out to West Papua to film one of the world's last undiscovered surfs and stumble upon the human rights crisis.

== Home media ==
- The documentary was released on DVD in 2009
- The documentary featured on the 'Best of 17th Raindance Film Festival Shorts' DVD, released in October 2010

== Awards ==
- Best Documentary – Dam Short Film Festival, USA, 2011
- Best Short Documentary – Davis International Film Festival, USA, 2015

== See also ==
- Free Papua Movement
- Act of Free Choice
