= Papua conflict =

1962–present separatist conflict in Indonesian New Guinea

- Part of the aftermath of Western New Guinea dispute, Separatism in Indonesia, and terrorism in Indonesia
- Papua province; Highland Papua province; Central Papua province; South Papua province; West Papua province; Southwest Papua province
Date	1 October 1962 – present; (64 years, 1 month and 16 days)
Location	Predominantly in Central Papua and Highland Papua; less prominent in Papua, South Papua, and West Papua, Indonesia; (New Guinea)
Status	Ongoing

Belligerents
Indonesia Papua New Guinea	Free Papua Movement

Units involved
Indonesia; Indonesian National Armed Forces; Koopssus; BAIS; Indonesian Army; Kostrad; Kopassus; Tontaipur; Indonesian Navy; Indonesian Marine Corps; Denjaka; Indonesian Air Force; Korpasgat; Bravo Detachment 90; Indonesian National Police; Mobile Brigade Corps; Detachment 88; Indonesian State Intelligence Agency; Paramilitary unit: Barisan Merah Putih; PNG Defence Force	Autonomous units affiliated with the TPNPB; ULMWP; WPA; KNPB; Volunteers from Papua New Guinea

Strength
Unknown	1,200–1,438 (2024 estimate)

Casualties and losses
72 soldiers (mostly non-combat) and 34 policemen killed (2010 – March 2022); 39 soldiers and 17 policemen killed (2023–2025)	At least 38 killed (2010 – March 2022); Cartenz's Peace task force: 272 killed (2021–2025); 1,384 captured (through 2025)
- 320 civilians killed (2010 – March 2022); 129 civilians killed (2023–2025); Estimates of total civilian deaths vary between 100,000 and 300,000; 800,000 civilians killed (Papuan sources)

The Papua conflict (Indonesian: Konflik Papua) is an ongoing conflict in Western New Guinea between Indonesia and the Free Papua Movement (Organisasi Papua Merdeka, OPM), a pro-independence group in the region.

Following the withdrawal of Dutch colonial rule from Dutch New Guinea in 1962, the United Nations (UN) oversaw a short transitional period before Indonesia took full control in 1963. Since then, Papuan fighters have launched a low-intensity armed resistance targeting the military and police, alongside acts of civil resistance and peaceful protests. Many Papuans seek full independence or unification with Papua New Guinea, raising the Morning Star flag in defiance of Indonesian repression.

Widespread atrocities committed by Indonesian forces have led human rights groups to describe the situation as a genocide against the indigenous Papuan population. Reports of mass killings, forced displacement, and sexual violence are extensive and credible. According to a 2007 estimate by scholar De R. G. Crocombe, between 100,000 and 800,000 Papuans have been killed since Indonesia's occupation began. A 2004 report by Yale Law School argued that the scale and intent of Indonesia's actions fall within the legal definition of genocide. State violence has targeted women in particular. A 2013 and 2017 study by AJAR and the Papuan Women's Working Group found that 4 in 10 Papuan women reported suffering state abuse, while a 2019 follow-up found similar results. (Note: From a sample of 170 women from 2013 and 2017 (4 out of 10).) (Note: State violence is defined as illegal detentions, torture, attempted shooting, sexual violence, husbands/family members disappeared or killed, husbands/family members detained, loss or destruction of property, loss of indigenous land committed by state covering three periods of 1977–78, 2005, and 2007.)

In 2022, the UN condemned what it described as "shocking abuses" committed by the Indonesian state, including the killing of children, disappearances, torture, and large-scale forced displacement. It called for "urgent and unrestricted humanitarian aid to the region." Human Rights Watch (HRW) has noted that the Papuan region functions as a de facto police state, where peaceful political expression and independence advocacy are met with imprisonment and violence. While some analysts argue that the conflict is aggravated by a lack of state presence in remote areas, the overwhelming trend points to systemic state violence and neglect.

Indonesia continues to block foreign access to the Papuan region, citing so-called "safety and security concerns", though critics argue this is to suppress international scrutiny of its genocidal practices. Several international and regional actors have called for stronger intervention, including the deployment of a peacekeeping force.

== Historical background ==
=== Overview ===
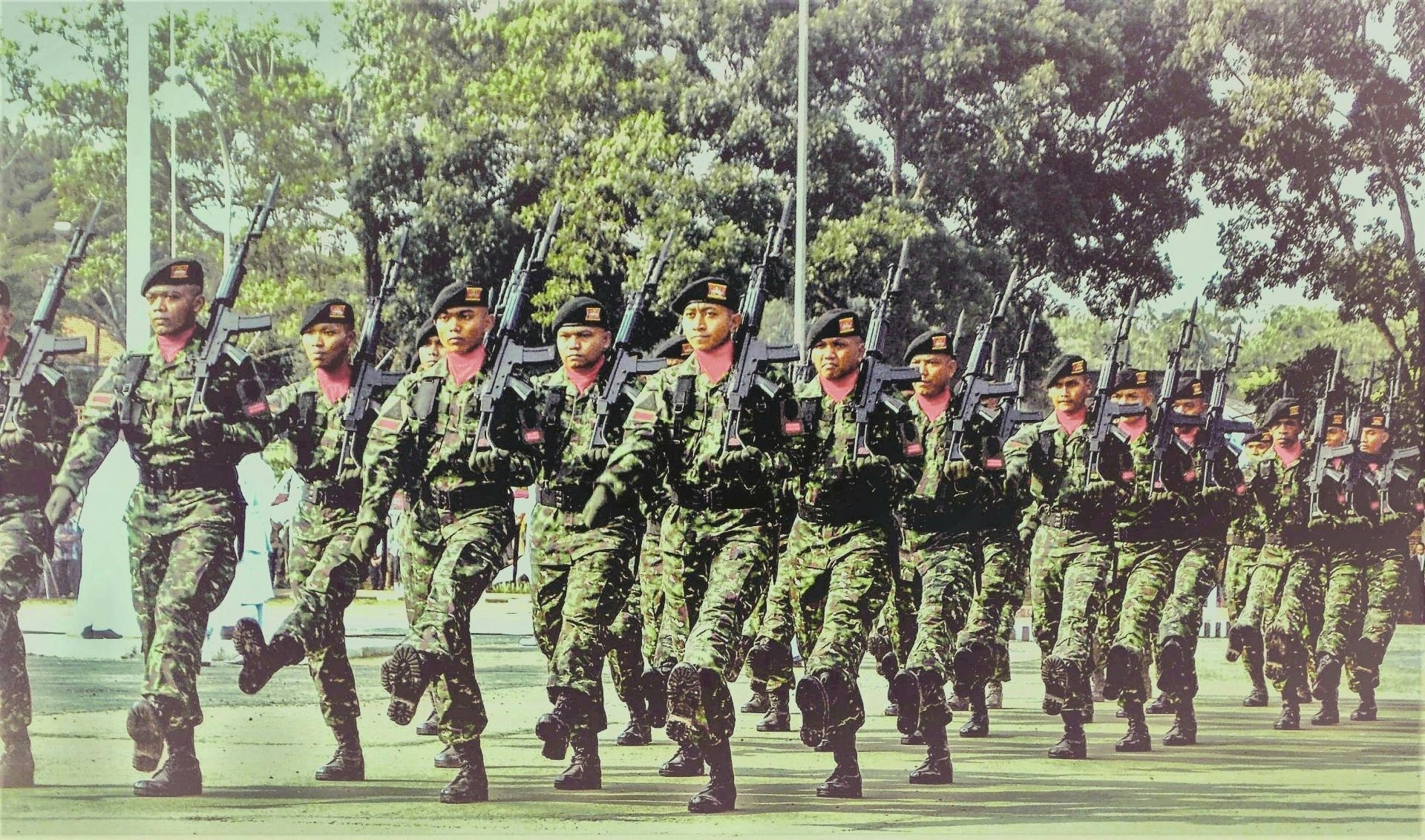
The Indonesian National Armed Forces has been accused of committing human rights abuses in Papua.

In December 1949, at the end of the Indonesian National Revolution, the Netherlands agreed to recognise Indonesian sovereignty over the territories of the former Dutch East Indies, with the exception of Western New Guinea, which the Dutch continued to hold as Netherlands New Guinea. The nationalist Indonesian government argued that it was the successor state to the whole of the final Dutch East Indies territories and wanted to end the Dutch colonial presence in the archipelago. The Netherlands argued that the Papuans were ethnically different and that the Netherlands would continue to administer the territory until it was capable of self-determination. From 1950 onwards, the Dutch and the Western powers agreed that the Papuans should be given an independent state, but due to global considerations, mainly the Kennedy administration's desire to keep Indonesia on their side of the Cold War, the United States pressured the Dutch to sacrifice Papua's independence and transfer the territory to Indonesia.

In 1962, the Dutch agreed to relinquish the territory to temporary United Nations administration, signing the New York Agreement, which included a provision that a plebiscite would be held before 1969. The Indonesian military organised this vote, called the Act of Free Choice in 1969 to determine the population's views on the territory's future; the result was in favor of integration into Indonesia. In violation of the Agreement between Indonesia and the Netherlands, the vote was a show of hands in the presence of the Indonesian military, and only involved 1,025 hand picked people who were "forced at gunpoint" to vote for integration, much less than 1% of those who should have been eligible to vote. The legitimacy of the vote is hence disputed by independence activists who protest the military occupation of Papua by Indonesia. Indonesia is regularly accused of human rights abuses, including attacks on OPM-sympathetic civilians and detaining those who raise the Morning Star flag under accusations of treason.

As a result of the transmigration program, which since 1969 has included migration to Papua, about half of inhabitants of Indonesian Papua are migrants. Interracial marriages are increasingly common and the children of trans-migrants have come to see themselves as "Papuan" over their parents' ethnic group. As of 2010, 13,500 Papuan refugees live in exile in the neighbouring Papua New Guinea (PNG) and fighting occasionally spills over the border. As a result the Papua New Guinea Defence Force (PNGDF) has set up patrols along PNG's western border to prevent infiltration by the OPM. Since the late 1970s, the OPM have made retaliatory "threats against PNG business projects and politicians for the PNGDF's operations against the OPM". The PNGDF has performed joint border patrols with Indonesia since the 1980s, although the PNGDF's operations against the OPM are "parallel".

=== Origins ===
Prior to the arrival of the Dutch, two Moluccan principalities known as the Sultanate of Tidore and the Sultanate of Ternate claimed dominion over Western New Guinea. In 1660, the Dutch recognized the Sultan of Tidore's sovereignty over New Guinea. It thus became notionally Dutch as the Dutch held power over Tidore. A century later, in 1793, the United Kingdom attempted a failed settlement near Manokwari. After almost 30 years, in 1824 the United Kingdom and the Netherlands agreed to divide the land; rendering the eastern half of the island as being under British control and the western half would become part of the Dutch East Indies.

In 1828, the Dutch established a settlement in Lobo (near Kaimana) which also failed. Almost 30 years later, the Germans established the first missionary settlement on an island near Manokwari. While in 1828 the Dutch claimed the south coast west of the 141st meridian and the north coast west of Humboldt Bay in 1848, Dutch activity in New Guinea was minimal until 1898 when the Dutch established an administrative center, which was subsequently followed by missionaries and traders. Under Dutch rule, commercial links were developed between West New Guinea and Eastern Indonesia. In 1883, New Guinea was divided between the Netherlands, the United Kingdom, and Germany; with Australia occupying the German territory in 1914. In 1901, the Netherlands formally purchased West New Guinea from the Sultanate of Tidore, incorporating it into the Dutch East Indies. During World War II, the territory was occupied by Japan but was later recaptured by the Allies, who restored Dutch rule.

The unification of Western New Guinea with Papua New Guinea was official Australian government policy for a short period of time in the 1960s, before Indonesia's annexation of the region. Generally, proposals regarding federation with Papua New Guinea are a minority view in the freedom movement. Arguments for federation generally focus around shared cultural identity between the two halves of the island.

Four years after the 17 August 1945 proclamation of Indonesian independence, the Indonesian National Revolution ended with the Dutch–Indonesian Round Table Conference in late 1949 at which the Netherlands agreed to transfer sovereignty to the United States of Indonesia, the successor state to the Dutch East Indies. However, the Dutch refused to include Netherlands New Guinea in the new Indonesian Republic and decided to assist and prepare it for independence as a separate country. It was agreed that the present status quo of the territory would be maintained and then negotiated bilaterally one year after the date of the transfer of sovereignty. This transfer formally occurred on 27 December 1949.

A year later, both Indonesia and the Netherlands were still unable to resolve their differences, which led Indonesian President Sukarno to accuse the Dutch of reneging on their promises to negotiate the handover of the territory. The Dutch were persistent in their argument that the territory did not belong to Indonesia because the Melanesian Papuans were ethnically and geographically different from Indonesians, and that the territory had always been administrated separately. On top of that, some Papuans did not participate in the Indonesian Revolution, and that educated Papuans at the time were split between those supporting Indonesian integration, those supporting Dutch colonial rules, and those supporting Papuan independence.

While at face-value, the Dutch seemed to have the Papuans' interest at heart, political scientist Arend Lijphart disagreed. He argued that other underlying Dutch motives to prevent West New Guinea from joining Indonesia included the territory's lucrative economic resources, its strategic importance as a Dutch naval base, and its potential role for creating a Eurasian homeland, housing the Eurasians who had become displaced by the Indonesian National Revolution. The Dutch also wanted to maintain a regional presence and to secure their economic interests in Indonesia.

On the other hand, Indonesia regarded West New Guinea as an intrinsic part of the country on the basis that Indonesia was the successor state to the Dutch East Indies. Papuans participated in the momentous 1928 Youth Pledge, the first proclamation of an "Indonesian identity" which symbolically was attended by numerous ethnic youth groups from all over Indonesia. Indonesian irredentist sentiments were also inflamed by the fact that several Indonesian political prisoners (mainly leftist and communist from the failed 1926 uprising) had been interned at a remote prison camp north of Merauke called Boven-Digoel in 1935 prior to World War II. They made contact with many Papuan civil servants which formed Indonesian revolution groups in Papua. Some support also came from native kingdoms mainly around Bomberai Peninsula which had extensive relationship with Sultanate of Tidore, these efforts was led by Machmud Singgirei Rumagesan, King of Sekar. These sentiments were also reflected in the popular Indonesian revolutionary slogan "Indonesia Merdeka- dari Sabang sampai Merauke" "Indonesia Free—from Sabang to Merauke. The slogan indicates the stretch of Indonesian territory from the most western part in Sumatra, Sabang, and the most eastern part in Merauke, a small city in West New Guinea. Sukarno also contended that the continuing Dutch presence in West New Guinea was an obstacle to the process of nation-building in Indonesia and that it would also encourage secessionist movements.

=== Bilateral negotiations (1950–1953) ===
The Netherlands and Indonesia tried to resolve the West New Guinea dispute through several rounds of bilateral negotiations between 1950 and 1953. These negotiations were unsuccessful and led the two governments to harden their stance and position. On 15 February 1952, the Dutch Parliament voted to incorporate New Guinea into the realm of the Netherlands and shortly after, the Netherlands refused further discussion on the question of sovereignty and considered the issue to be closed. In response, President Sukarno adopted a more forceful stance towards the Dutch. Initially, he unsuccessfully tried to force the Indonesian government to abrogate the Round Table agreements and to adopt economic sanctions but was rebuffed by the Natsir Cabinet. Undeterred by this setback, Sukarno made recovering the territory a top priority of his presidency and sought to harness popular support from the Indonesian public for this goal throughout many of his speeches between 1951 and 1952.

By 1953, the dispute had become the central issue in Indonesian domestic politics. All political parties across the political spectrum, particularly the Communist Party of Indonesia (PKI), supported Sukarno's efforts to integrate the territory into Indonesia. According to historians Audrey and George McTurnan Kahin, the PKI's pro-integration stance helped the party to rebuild its political base and to further its credentials as a nationalist Communist Party that supported Sukarno.

=== United Nations (1954–1957) ===
In 1954, Indonesia decided to take the dispute to the United Nations and succeeded in having it placed on the agenda for the upcoming ninth session of the United Nations General Assembly (UNGA). In response, the Dutch Ambassador to the United Nations, Herman van Roijen, warned that the Netherlands would ignore any recommendations which might be made by the UN regarding the dispute. During the Bandung Conference in April 1955, Indonesia succeeded in securing a resolution supporting its claim to West New Guinea from African and Asian countries. In addition, Indonesia was also supported by the Soviet Union and its Warsaw Pact allies.

In terms of international support, the Netherlands was supported by the United States, the United Kingdom, Australia, New Zealand, and several Western European and Latin American countries. However, these countries were unwilling to commit to providing military support in the event of a conflict with Indonesia. The Eisenhower administration were open to non-violent territorial changes but rejected the use of any military means to resolve the dispute. Until 1961, the United States pursued a policy of strict neutrality and abstained on every vote on the dispute. According to the historian Nicholas Tarling, the United Kingdom took the position that it was "strategically undesirable" for control of the territory to pass to Indonesia because it created a precedent for encouraging territorial changes based on political prestige and geographical proximity.

The Australian Menzies government welcomed the Dutch presence in the region as an "essential link" in its national defense since it also administrated a trust territory in the eastern half of New Guinea. Unlike the Labor Party which had supported the Indonesian nationalists, the Prime Minister Robert Menzies viewed Indonesia as a potential threat to its national security and distrusted the Indonesian leadership for supporting Japan during World War II. In addition, New Zealand and South Africa also opposed Indonesia's claim to the territory. New Zealand accepted the Dutch argument that the Papuans were culturally different from the Indonesians and thus supported maintaining Dutch sovereignty over the territory until the Papuans were ready for self-rule. By contrast, newly independent India, another Commonwealth member supported Indonesia's position.

Between 1954 and 1957, Indonesia and their Afro-Asian allies made three attempts to get the United Nations to intervene. All these three resolutions, however, failed to gain a two–thirds majority in the UNGA. On 30 November 1954, the Indian representative Krishna Menon initiated a resolution calling for Indonesia and the Netherlands to resume negotiations and to report to the 10th UNGA Session. This resolution was sponsored by eight countries (Argentina, Costa Rica, Cuba, Ecuador, El Salvador, India, Syria, and Yugoslavia) but failed to secure a two-thirds majority (34–23–3). In response to growing tensions between Jakarta and the Hague, Indonesia unilaterally dissolved the Netherlands-Indonesian Union on 13 February 1956, and also rescinded compensation claims to the Dutch. Undeterred by this setback, Indonesia resubmitted the dispute to the UNGA agenda in November 1965.

On 23 February 1957, a 13 country–sponsored resolution (Bolivia, Burma, Ceylon, Costa Rica, Ecuador, India, Iraq, Pakistan, Saudi Arabia, Sudan, Syria, and Yugoslavia) calling for the United Nations to appoint a "good offices commission" for West New Guinea was submitted to the UNGA. Despite receiving a plural majority (40–25–13), this second resolution failed to gain a two-thirds majority. Undeterred, the Afro-Asian caucus in the United Nations lobbied for the dispute to be included on the UNGA agenda. On 4 October 1957, Indonesia's Foreign Minister Subandrio warned that Indonesia would embark on "another cause" if the United Nations failed to bring about a solution to the dispute that favoured Indonesia. That month, the PKI and affiliated trade unions lobbied for retaliatory economic measures against the Dutch. On 26 November 1957, a third Indonesian resolution on the West New Guinea dispute was put to the vote but failed to gain a two-thirds majority (41–29–11).

=== West Papua's national identity ===
Following the recent defeat at the UN, Indonesia embarked on a national campaign targeting Dutch interests in Indonesia; leading to the withdrawal of the Dutch flag carrier KLM's landing rights, mass demonstrations, and the seizure of the Dutch shipping line Koninklijke Paketvaart-Maatschappij (KPM), Dutch-owned banks, and other estates. By January 1958, 10,000 Dutch nationals had left Indonesia, many returning to the Netherlands. This spontaneous nationalisation had adverse repercussions on Indonesia's economy, disrupting communications and affecting the production of exports. President Sukarno also abandoned efforts to raise the dispute at the 1958 UNGA, claiming that reason and persuasion had failed. Following a sustained period of harassment against Dutch diplomatic representatives in Jakarta, Indonesia formally severed relations with the Netherlands in August 1960.

In response to Indonesian aggression, the Netherlands stepped up its efforts to prepare the Papuans for self-determination in 1959. These efforts culminated in the establishment of a hospital in Hollandia (modern–day Jayapura), a shipyard in Manokwari, agricultural research sites, plantations, and a military force known as the Papuan Volunteer Corps. By 1960, a legislative New Guinea Council had been established with a mixture of legislative, advisory and policy functions had been established. Half of its members were to be elected and elections for this council were held the following year. Most importantly, the Dutch also sought to create a sense of West Papuan national identity and these efforts led to the creation of a national flag (the Morning Star flag), a national anthem, and a coat of arms. The Dutch had planned to transfer independence to West New Guinea in 1970.

==== Preparation for independence ====
By 1960, other countries in the Asia-Pacific had taken notice of the dispute and began proposing initiatives to end it. During a visit to the Netherlands, the New Zealand Prime Minister Walter Nash suggested the idea of a united New Guinea state, consisting of both Dutch and Australian territories. This idea received little support from both Indonesia and other Western governments. Later that year, the Malayan Prime Minister Tunku Abdul Rahman proposed a three-step initiative, which involved West New Guinea coming under United Nations trusteeship. The joint administrators would be three non-aligned nations Ceylon, India, and Malaya, which supported Indonesia's position. This solution involved the two belligerents, Indonesia and the Netherlands, re-establishing bilateral relations and the return of Dutch assets and investments to their owners. However, this initiative was scuttled in April 1961 due to opposition from Indonesia's Foreign Minister Subandrio, who publicly attacked Tunku's proposal.

By 1961, the Netherlands was struggling to find adequate international support for its policy to prepare West New Guinea for independent status under Dutch guidance. While the Netherlands' traditional Western allies—the United States, the United Kingdom, Australia, and New Zealand—were sympathetic to Dutch policy, they were unwilling to provide any military support in the event of conflict with Indonesia. On 26 September 1961, the Dutch Foreign Minister Joseph Luns offered to hand over the territory to a United Nations trusteeship. This proposal was firmly rejected by his Indonesian counterpart Subandrio, who likened the dispute to Katanga's attempted secession from the Republic of Congo during the Congo Crisis. By October 1961, the United Kingdom was open to transferring West New Guinea to Indonesia while the United States floated the idea of a jointly-administered trusteeship over the territory.

==== Call for the resumption of talks ====
On 23 November 1961, the Indian delegation at the United Nations presented a draft resolution calling for the resumption of Dutch–Indonesian talks on terms which favoured Indonesia. Two days later, several Francophone countries in Africa tabled a rival resolution which favoured an independent West New Guinea. Indonesia favoured India's resolution while the Dutch, the United Kingdom, Australia, and New Zealand supported the Francophone African one. On 27 November 1961, both the Francophone African (52–41–9) and Indian (41–40–21) resolutions were put to the vote, but neither succeeded in gaining a two–thirds majority at the UNGA. The failure of this final round of diplomacy in the UN convinced Indonesia to prepare for a military invasion.

=== Handover, UN administration and plebiscite ===
By 1961, the United States had become concerned about the Indonesian military's purchase of Soviet weapons and equipment for a planned invasion of West New Guinea. The Kennedy administration feared an Indonesian drift towards Communism and wanted to court Sukarno away from the Soviet bloc and Communist China. The United States also wanted to repair relations with Jakarta, which had deteriorated due to the Eisenhower administration's covert support for regional uprisings in Sumatra and Sulawesi. These factors convinced the Kennedy administration to intervene diplomatically to bring about a peaceful solution to the dispute, which favored Indonesia.

Throughout 1962, US diplomat Ellsworth Bunker facilitated top–secret high–level negotiations between Indonesia and the Netherlands. This produced a peace settlement known as the New York Agreement on 15 August 1962. As a face-saving measure, the Dutch would hand over West New Guinea to a provisional United Nations Temporary Executive Authority (UNTEA) on 1 October 1962, which then ceded the territory to Indonesia on 1 May 1963; formally ending the dispute. As part of the agreement, it was stipulated that a popular plebiscite would be held in 1969 to determine whether the Papuans would choose to remain in Indonesia or seek self-determination. Implementation of Indonesian governance was followed by sporadic fighting between Indonesian and pro-Papuan forces until 1969.

1995 ABC news report on the impact of transmigration on the Dani people in Papua.

Following the Act of Free Choice plebiscite in 1969, Western New Guinea was formally integrated into the Republic of Indonesia. Instead of a referendum of the 816,000 Papuans, only 1,022 Papuan tribal representatives were allowed to vote, and they were coerced into voting in favour of integration. While several international observers including journalists and diplomats criticised the referendum as being rigged, the U.S. and Australia support Indonesia's efforts to secure acceptance in the United Nations for the pro-integration vote. That same year, 84 member states voted in favour for the United Nations to accept the result, with 30 others abstaining. A number of Papuans refused to accept the territory's integration into Indonesia, which anti-independence supporters and foreign observers attributed to the Netherlands' efforts to promote a West Papuan national identity among right-leaning Papuans and suppressed left-leaning Papuans pro-Indonesian sympathies. These formed the separatist Organisasi Papua Merdeka (Free Papua Movement) and have waged an insurgency against the Indonesian authorities, which continues to this day.

== International support for self-determination ==
=== Countries ===
The following states have denounced the Act of Free Choice and/or support Papuan self-determination:

- Saint Vincent and the Grenadines – Saint Vincent and the Grenadines expressed their support for Papuan self-determination in 2017 at the UNGA, addressed by Deputy Prime Minister, H.E. Mr. Louis Straker.
- Vanuatu – Vanuatu passed the Wantok Blong Yumi Bill in 2010 and expressed their support for Papuan self-determination in 2017 at the UNGA.
- Solomon Islands – The Solomon Islands expressed their support for Papuan self-determination in 2017 at the UNGA.
- Tonga – Tongan Prime Minister ʻAkilisi Pōhiva urged the world to take action on the human rights situation in Indonesia's West Papua region.
- Tuvalu – Former Prime Minister Enele Sopoaga supported Papuan self-determination at the United Nations General Assembly in 2017 and signed a joint statement with other Pacific island nations in May 2017.
- Nauru – In 2017, Nauru signed a joint declaration supporting Papuan self-determination.
- Palau – In 2017, Palau signed a joint declaration supporting Papuan self-determination.
- Marshall Islands – In 2017, the Marshall Islands signed a joint declaration supporting Papuan self-determination.

=== Politicians ===
Name	Country	Political party	Reference(s)
Abdoulaye Wade (Note: Former President of Senegal.)	Senegal	Senegalese Democratic Party	
Adam Bandt	Australia	Australian Greens	
ʻAkilisi Pōhiva (Note: Former Prime Minister of Tonga.)	Tonga	Democratic Party of the Friendly Islands	
Jeremy Corbyn	United Kingdom	Your Party (formerly Labour Party)	
John Kufour (Note: Former Prime Minister of Ghana.)	Ghana	New Patriotic Party	
Jerry Rawlings (Note: Former President of Ghana.)	Ghana	National Democratic Congress	
Manasseh Sogavare (Note: Former Prime Minister of the Solomon Islands.)	Solomon Islands	Independent	
Marama Davidson	New Zealand	Green Party of Aotearoa New Zealand	
Powes Parkop	Papua New Guinea	Social Democratic Party	
Richard Di Natale	Australia	Australian Greens	
Scott Ludlam	Australia	Australian Greens	
Matthew Wale	Solomon Islands	Solomon Islands Democratic Party	
Carles Puigdemont	Spain	Together for Catalonia	
Alex Sobel	United Kingdom	Labour Party	
David Shoebridge	Australia	Australian Greens	

=== Political parties ===
Name	Country	Reference(s)
Australian Communist Party	Australia	
Australian Greens	Australia	
Democratic Labour Party	Australia	
Socialist Party of Malaysia	Malaysia	

=== Other organisations ===
The International Parliamentarians for West Papua is an international political organisation that supports West Papuan independence.

== See also ==
- Biak massacre
- Forgotten Bird of Paradise documentary
- United Liberation Movement for West Papua (ULMWP)
- Separatism
- Bougainville conflict, a similar conflict in Papua New Guinea which led to a referendum in 2019
