= Benny Wenda =

Republic of West Papua activist

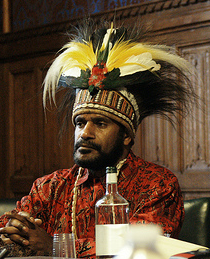
- Speaking at the launch of IPWP in the Houses of Parliament, London, October 2008

Interim President of the ULMWP Provisional Government (In Exile)
- In office December 2020 – September 2023

President of ULMWP
- Incumbent
- Assumed office November 2023 disputed with Menase Tabuni

Personal details
- Born: 1975 (age 50–51) Baliem Valley, Irian Jaya, Indonesia
- Children: Septinus Wenda, Koteka Wenda, etc.

Benny Wenda (born 1975) is a West Papuan independence leader and Chairman of the United Liberation Movement for West Papua (ULMWP). He is an international lobbyist for the independence of West Papua from Indonesia. He lives in exile in the United Kingdom. In 2003 he was granted political asylum by the British government following his escape from custody while on trial.

He has acted as special representative of the Papuan people in the British Parliament, United Nations and European Parliament. In 2017 he was appointed as the chairman for ULMWP, a new organisation which united the three main political organisations struggling for the independence of West Papua.

In 2020, the ULMWP announced a new constitution and government-in-waiting for the Republic of West Papua, with Wenda serving as interim president. His presidency was disputed by some elements of the West Papua National Liberation Army (Indonesian: Tentara Pembebasan Nasional Papua Barat), claiming his stay in the United Kingdom made his presidency illegitimate.

He was succeeded by Menase Tabuni in September 2023. In November 2023, he was reinstated as President of ULMWP after a congress in Jayapura, starting a leadership dispute with Menase Tabuni.

== Early life ==
Wenda was born in the Baliem Valley, in the central highlands of Irian Jaya, Indonesia. His date of birth is not exactly known; in his website, he only wrote that he was born in the 1970s.

In 1977 there was a rebellion of 15,000 Lani people in response to Indonesian military violence towards Papuans. The Indonesian military retaliated, with aircraft bombing Lani villages in the highlands. Those killed included many of Wenda's family. During the bombing raids, one of Wenda's legs was severely injured leading to impaired growth. Between 1977 and 1983 Benny and his family, along with thousands of other highlanders, lived in hiding in the jungle. He was appointed leader by the elders in his tribe, and later after the Lani people surrendered to the Indonesian military he attended Cenderawasih University in Jayapura, studying Sociology.

== Political leadership ==
Wenda became Secretary-General of Koteka Tribal Assembly (DeMMAK). DeMMAK was established by highland tribal elders with the goal of working towards recognition and protection of the customs, values and beliefs of the tribal people of the West Papuan highlands. It advocates independence from Indonesia, and rejects special autonomy or any other political compromise offered by the Indonesian government. As Secretary-General of Demmak, Wenda represented the council of elders. The organisation supported Papua Presidium Council (PDP) negotiations with Jakarta to the extent that they represented the aspiration of the Papuan peoples, which they claimed was independence from Indonesia.

== Imprisonment ==
Wenda was placed on trial in 2002 for allegedly leading a procession of people in an independence rally. The demonstration turned violent, with Indonesian authorities alleging that those present torched two shops and murdered a policeman. Wenda maintains that his arrest and the charges against him were politically motivated, coming at a time when authorities were clamping down on leaders of the independence movement. This clampdown had led to the assassination a few months earlier of the leading pro-independence figure Theys Eluay. Media reports state that Wenda was facing a 25-year jail sentence if found guilty. He was also allegedly subjected to death threats whilst being held in custody.

Wenda escaped prison while on trial. Helped by West Papua independence activists he fled across the border to neighbouring Papua New Guinea and was later reunited with his wife Maria at a refugee camp. Several months after this he was helped by a European NGO to travel to the UK where he was granted political asylum.

== Interpol ==
In 2011, the Indonesian Government issued an Interpol red notice seeking Mr Wenda's arrest and extradition. However, after a campaign led by Fair Trials International, in 2012 Interpol removed the red notice after an investigation concluded that the allegations against Mr Wenda were "politically motivated and an abuse of the system" by the Indonesian Government.

Speaking after Interpol had announced it had removed the red notice from its database, Jago Russell, Fair Trials International's chief executive stated "Interpol should be used to fight serious crime but Indonesia has been misusing it to threaten a peaceful political activist". In an interview with UK national The Daily Telegraph newspaper, Mr Wenda stated that he hoped attention would now "shift to the plight of my people in West Papua, who continue to suffer under an Indonesian regime that denies them almost every basic right that people in the West take for granted."

== Free West Papua Campaign ==
After arriving in the United Kingdom, Benny became the leading spokesperson for the Free West Papua Campaign, which was founded in 2004 by a group of pro-Papuan activists in Oxford. The campaign's stated aims are to spread awareness of the human rights situation and independence aspirations of the people of West Papua, through lobbying governments and developing support throughout civil society. The Free West Papua Campaign movement in the UK has grown to include permanent student groups at British universities and regional groups, as well as permanent offices in Oxford, the Hague and Port Moresby.

In February 2013 Wenda undertook a 'Freedom Tour' to the US, New Zealand, Australia, Papua New Guinea and Vanuatu, with the aim of raising awareness of the self-determination issue. He was blocked from holding a speech at New Zealand national parliament. Opposition parties accused the government of not wanting to upset the Indonesian Government, an important trading partner. Politicians of the Greens, Labour and Mana said the decision went "against the spirit of Parliament".

In April 2013, Wenda was joined by Mohammed Abassi, the Lord Mayor of Oxford and local MP Andrew Smith for the opening of a new headquarters for the Free West Papua Campaign. The opening provoked an angry response from the Indonesian Government, with the British Ambassador to Indonesia being summoned to explain why the UK had allowed the office to open.

In May 2013, Wenda spoke at the Sydney Opera House as part of the TEDx series, getting a standing ovation in front of the audience of 2,500 people. His appearance again provoked an angry response from the Indonesian authorities, with them launching an official complaint with the Australian government within hours of him taking the stage.

== International Parliamentarians for West Papua ==
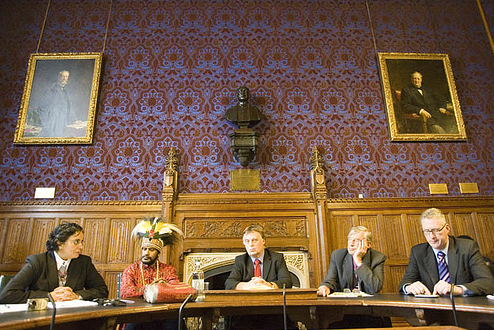
Inaugural meeting of the International Parliamentarians for West Papua, 2008

With British MP Andrew Smith and Lords peer Richard Harries, Benny Wenda is a founding member of the International Parliamentarians for West Papua. This cross-parliamentary group was launched at the Houses of Parliament in London in October 2008, and was attended by British parliamentarians including Lembit Öpik and Baron Avebury, as well as politicians from Papua New Guinea, Australia and Vanuatu.

The group is actively developing support from politicians around the world, and its overall aim is to assert enough political pressure on the United Nations to implement a re-run of the Act of Free Choice. As well as the UK launch, IPWP has also had launch events in the European Parliament, Scottish Parliament and also Papua New Guinea.

== International Lawyers for West Papua ==
In April 2009, Benny Wenda launched the International Lawyers for West Papua. The launch saw a series of high level meetings held by international lawyers in Guyana in South America. The aim of this group is to develop a framework within the international legal community towards outlining the legal basis for West Papuan self-determination, and the "illegality" of the Indonesian "occupation of West Papua". The launch of International Lawyers for West Papua coincided with Guyana stating their support for West Papuan independence.

== Awards ==
Benny Wenda has been nominated twice for the Nobel Peace Prize.

In 2019 he was awarded the Freedom of Oxford by Oxford City Council in the UK. Lord Mayor of Oxford Craig Simmons said the accolade was "well-deserved" and Mr Wenda was "contributing so much both locally and on the international stage".

== The Lani Singers ==
Benny and his wife Maria perform traditional West Papuan music as The Lani Singers. In 2008 they released their debut album. Entitled Ninalik Ndawi (Freedom Song), it received reviews in national newspapers including The Guardian and The Observer, and music magazines fRoots, Songlines and The Wire. The group undertook interviews and live sessions on World Routes on BBC Radio 3 and A World in London on BBC Radio London. They have also performed at Musicport Festival, Glastonbury Festival and the Thames Festival in London.

== Family life ==
Benny and Maria met while studying in West Papua, and have been married since 1999. Since being granted political asylum by the British Government they have lived in Oxford with their children.

== Documentary ==
A feature-length documentary about Benny Wenda, The Road to Home, was released in 2015. It was awarded the 'Best Documentary' award at the 2016 Amsterdam Film Festival.

== See also ==
- List of people granted political asylum
- Papua conflict
