= The Lani Singers =

Musical artist

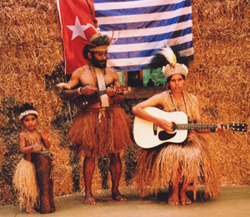
- The Lani Singers performing at the Strawbale Studio, 2004

Background information
- Origin: West Papua
- Genres: World Music, Folk Music, Traditional music
- Years active: 2002–present
- Labels: Dancing Turtle Records
- Members: Benny and Maria Wenda
- Website: www.thelanisingers.com

The Lani Singers are husband and wife Benny and Maria Wenda. They come from the Baliem Valley in the remote central highland region of West Papua in the south-west Pacific, and play songs that are rooted in the sacred rituals of the Lani tribe. It is claimed that the way of living of those living in this part of West Papua has remained largely unchanged since the Stone Age.

== Background ==
Leader of a highland tribal assembly that advocated independence for West Papua, Benny Wenda was placed on trial by the Indonesian authorities in 2002, on what have subsequently been exposed as politically motivated charges. He escaped custody whilst on trial, and aided by West Papua independence activists was smuggled across the border to neighbouring Papua New Guinea. A few months later he was reunited with his wife Maria and baby daughter at a refugee camp. Following this they were helped by a European NGO group to the UK where they were granted political asylum by the British Government.

== Group composition ==
Benny Wenda plays ukulele and Maria plays acoustic guitar. They are occasionally joined for live performances by additional members who play bass, guitar, and a traditional Papuan drum called a Tiva. The group have played at festivals including Glastonbury, Musicport, Port Eliot Festival, the Mayor of London's Thames Festival and Celebrating Sanctuary. They were also special guests of English Heritage for the Summer Solstice at Stonehenge in 2009.

== Releases ==
The Lani Singers have released two album Ninalik Ndawi and Ninalik Arirak.

The group's first album, Ninalik Ndawi, translates into English as Freedom Song. The album was released in November 2008 through the British independent record label Dancing Turtle Records. The album is described in the sleeve notes as being a mixture of traditional songs passed down through the generations by elders, as well some of their own compositions reflective of their plight. It was produced by Engin Hassan, and as well as Benny and Maria also featured English musicians Roger Harmar on fretless bass and Nick Radcliffe on slide guitar. The album was described by the Guardian newspaper in the UK as 'a gently haunting, rhythmic set that results from a remarkable personal story, and a little-reported struggle'. The group also undertook interviews and live sessions on BBC Radio 3 and BBC Radio London to support the release.

The group's second album, Ninalik Arirak, was released in 2013.
