= International Parliamentarians for West Papua =

West Papua self-determination political group

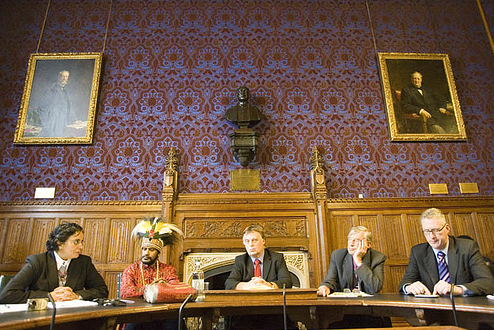
IPWP launch in the Houses Of Parliament, London, October 2008

The International Parliamentarians for West Papua (IPWP) are a cross-party political group of politicians from around the world who support self-determination for the people of the Indonesian region of West Papua.

== History ==
IPWP were launched at the Houses of Parliament, London, UK on 15 October 2008. Speakers at the launch included Melinda Janki (International Human Rights Lawyer), Hon. Andrew Smith MP (UK), Lord Harries (UK), Hon Lembit Öpik MP (UK), Lord Avebury (UK), Benny Wenda (West Papua), Hon. Powes Parkop MP (Papua New Guinea), Hon. Moana Carcasses Kalosil MP (Vanuatu) and Carmel Budiarjo (TAPOL).
There have been further launches of IPWP held in Port Moresby, Papua New Guinea hosted by Powes Parkop in September 2009, and in the European Parliament in Brussels, Belgium hosted by Caroline Lucas MEP in January 2010.

IPWP was set up by exiled West Papuan independence advocate Benny Wenda, and is chaired by the British Labour Party MP Andrew Smith and Lord Harries. Smith is also the Chairman of the All Party Parliamentary Group for West Papua. The main goal of IPWP is to develop international parliamentary support and awareness for the West Papuan independence movement. The IPWP takes as its model a similar group that helped lead the independence movement of East Timor.

By 2009, the IPWP included fifty parliamentarians from countries including Papua New Guinea, Australia, Sweden, New Zealand, Vanuatu, the Czech Republic, and the United Kingdom. In February 2012, the Australian government officially distanced itself from an IPWP meeting that took place in Canberra, stating that it remained "fully committed to Indonesia's territorial integrity and national unity". As of 2020, there are approximately 80 current parliamentarians listed as signatories from countries across five continents.

== International Lawyers for West Papua ==
Plans were also announced to set up another body called International Lawyers for West Papua (ILWP), to work in unison with IPWP, and develop and co-ordinate support within the legal sector for West Papuan self-determination. The launch for this took place in April 2009 in Guyana, South America. Since 2009 ILWP has provided legal advice to the movement for self-determination in West Papua, including advice to the United Liberation Movement for West Papua (ULMWP)

== See also ==
- Human rights in Western New Guinea
- Papua conflict
