= Act of Free Choice =

1969 referendum in Western New Guinea

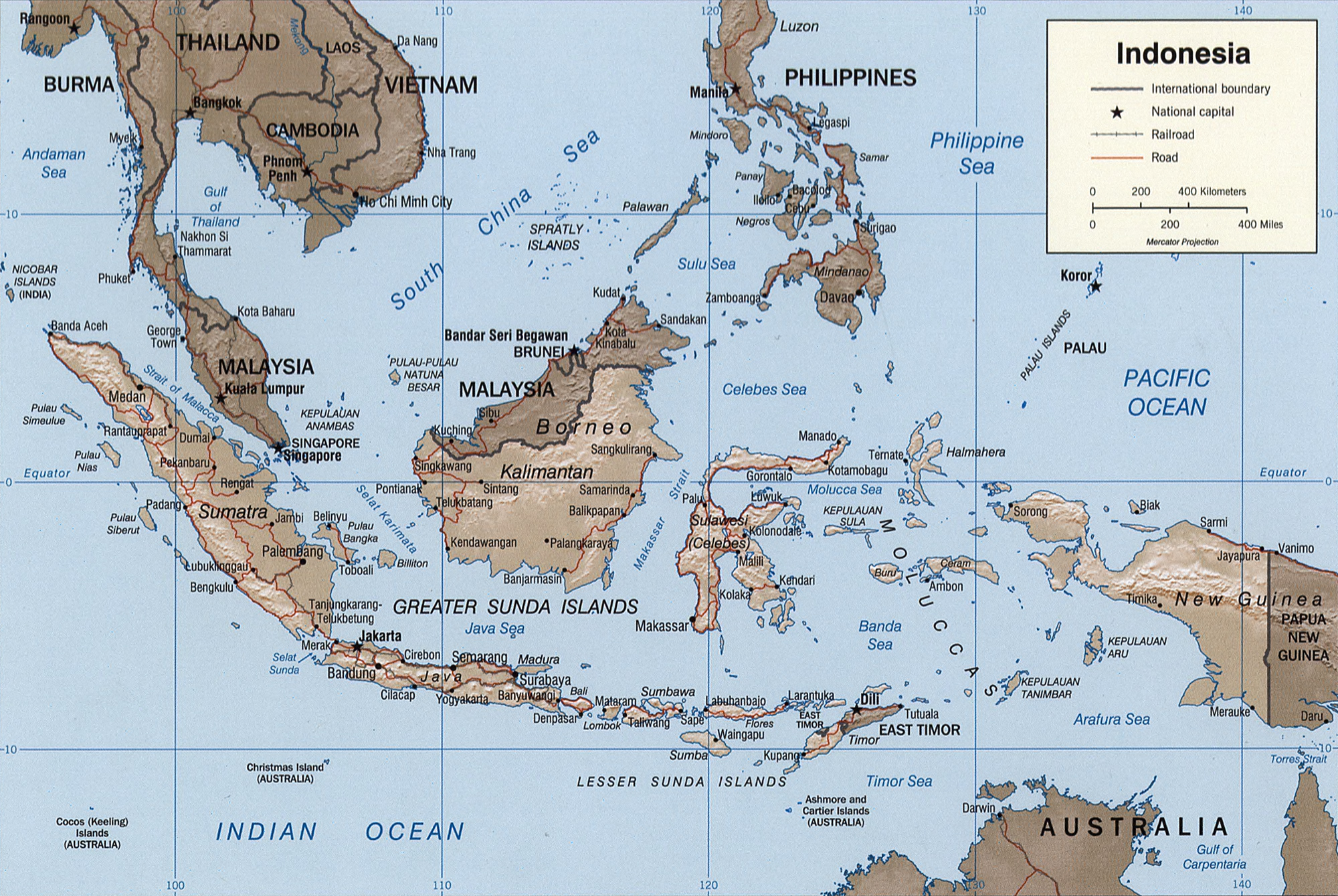
A map showing Indonesia including Western New Guinea.

The Act of Free Choice (Indonesian: Penentuan Pendapat Rakyat, PEPERA, lit. 'Determination of the People‘s Opinion') was a controversial plebiscite held between 14 July and 2 August 1969 in which 1,025 people selected by the Indonesian military in Western New Guinea voted unanimously in favor of Indonesian control.

The event was mentioned by the United Nations in General Assembly resolution 2504 (XXIV) without giving an opinion whether it complied with the authorizing New York Agreement, and without giving an opinion whether it was an act of "self-determination" as referred to and described in United Nations General Assembly resolutions 1514 and 1541 (XV) respectively. The event is sometimes disparagingly referred to as the "Act of No Choice" because of its controversial process.

== Background ==
The referendum and its conduct had been specified in the New York Agreement; Article 17 of which in part says:

"Indonesia will invite the Secretary-General to appoint a Representative who" ... "will carry out Secretary-General's responsibilities to advise, assist, and participate in arrangements which are the responsibility of Indonesia for the act of free choice. The Secretary-General will, at the proper time, appoint the United Nations Representative in order that he and his staff may assume their duties in the territory one year prior to the self-determination." ... "The United Nations Representative and his staff will have the same freedom of movement as provided for the personnel referred to in Article XVI".

The agreement continues with Article 18:

Article XVIII

Indonesia will make arrangements, with the assistance and participation of the United Nations Representative and his staff, to give the people of the territory, the opportunity to exercise freedom of choice. Such arrangements will include:

- a. Consultation (musyawarah) with the representative councils on procedures and methods to be followed for ascertaining the freely expressed will of the population.
- b. The determination of the actual date of the exercise of free choice within the period established by the present Agreement.
- c. Formulations of the questions in such a way as to permit the inhabitants to decide (a) whether they wish to remain with Indonesia; or (b) whether they wish to sever ties with Indonesia.
- d. The eligibility of all adults, male and female, not foreign nationals to participate in the act of self-determination to be carried out in accordance with international practice, who are resident at the time of the signing of the present Agreement, including those residents who departed after 1945 and who returned to the territory to resume residence after the termination of the Netherlands administration.

== Process ==
Under Article 17 of the New York Agreement, the plebiscite was not to occur until one year after the arrival of U.N. representative Fernando Ortiz-Sanz (the Bolivian ambassador to the United Nations) in the territory on 22 August 1968. Ortiz-Sanz and his team had to rely on the Indonesian government for housing, resources and transport around the region, and Ortiz-Sanz noted that they were "followed everywhere" by Indonesian officials in a way that restrained them from talking with the local Papuans.

Date	Location	Number of Electors
14 July 1969	Merauke	175
16 July 1969	Wamena	175
19 July 1969	Nabire	175
23 July 1969	Fak-Fak	75
26 July 1969	Sorong	110
29 July 1969	Manokwari	75
31 July 1969	Biak	130
2 August 1969	Djajapura	110

The New York Agreement specified that all men and women in Papua who were not foreign nationals had the right to vote in the Act. General Sarwo Edhi Wibowo instead selected 1,025 Papuan men and women out of an estimated population of 800,000 as the Western New Guinea representatives for the vote, which was conducted across eight regencies over three weeks. Electors were asked to vote by raising their hands or reading from prepared scripts, in a display for United Nations observers. They voted publicly and unanimously in favour of Indonesian control.

While a unanimous vote was often claimed, this was not true, as recorded in a meeting for Fakfak representatives on July 23rd; Edward Hegemur, a former bestuur in Kaimana, while pointing at a map of Irian, voted against integration with Indonesia and asked anyone among the 75 Fakfak representatives who agreed with him to stand up. None did, except Ortiz-Sanz, who was already standing. He continued, "If I were to be shot dead today, let my gravestone be engraved, 'Pahlawan Papua' (Hero of Papua), because today I claimed Papua to be free." Later Hegemur was called to the local military office (Kodim), though he claimed no action was done to him after a direct order from Suharto to not interfere with the official results. Later in an election for the leader of Fakfak Regional People's Representative Council, where Hegemur won, Hegemur proclaimed he voted against integration with Indonesia, and that proved that PEPERA was conducted fairly.

According to Hugh Lunn, a journalist from Reuters, men who were selected for the vote were coerced into voting against independence with threats of violence against their persons and their families. Lunn also claims that outside the assembly, Papuan youths protesting the vote were thrown into army trucks and driven away, and that he, as the only foreign journalist, was threatened at gunpoint for taking photos of the demonstration. The men and women who voted were instructed beforehand by the Indonesian military's Special Operations Section exactly what to say during the plebiscite, and unsurprisingly reproduced nearly the same opinions with exactly the same wording — that the Papuans had considered themselves Indonesian since 1945, and were to be one people with the Indonesians under the Indonesian flag. Despite this, Ortiz-Sanz's UN team in 1969 estimated that 95% of the Papuans supported independence. A British journalist who visited the region in an early 1968 visit claimed that he spoke to 300-400 West Papuans, and none of them supported a merger with Indonesia, noting that the Papuans seemed to loathe the Indonesians. Contemporary diplomatic cables showed American diplomats suspecting that Indonesia could not have won a fair vote, and also suspecting that the vote was not implemented freely, but the diplomats saw the event as a "foregone conclusion" and "marginal to U.S. interests". Ortiz-Sanz wrote in his report that "an act of free choice has taken place in accordance with Indonesian practice”, but not confirming that it was in accordance with international practice as the Act of Free Choice had required.

The United Nations took note of the results with General Assembly Resolution 2504.

== Aftermath ==
=== Demands for a revote ===
The Act of Free Choice has sometimes been criticized as the "act of no choice", and many independence activists continuously protest for a fresh referendum for every single Papuan. After the fall of Suharto in 1998, human rights activist Archbishop Desmond Tutu and some American and European parliamentarians requested United Nations Secretary Kofi Annan to review the United Nations' role in the vote and the validity of the Act of Free Choice. The Indonesian government's position is that the United Nations' noting of the results validates it.

A new referendum is supported by many organisations including the indigenous Free Papua Movement (OPM), and the Free West Papua Campaign which work to provide West Papuans with self-determination and full independence from Indonesian rule.

=== Monuments ===
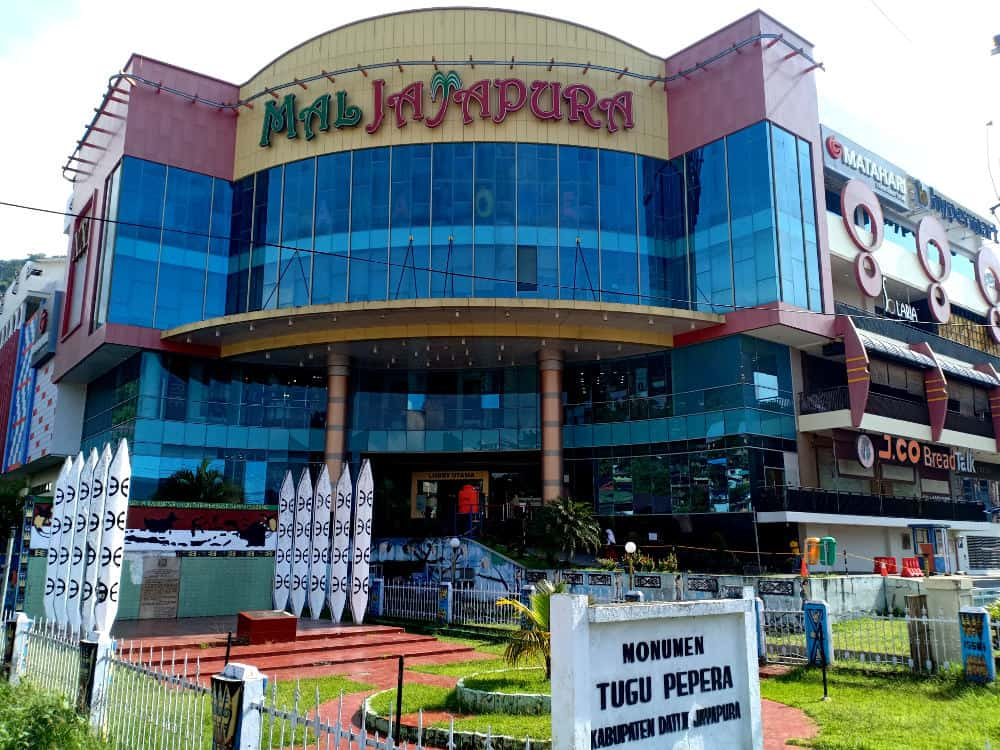
A Pepera monument in Jayapura, in front of Mal Jayapura shopping center

Monuments commemorating the event are built in Jayapura, Papua and Merauke, South Papua. They were inaugurated by President Suharto on 16 and 17 September 1969, respectively.

== See also ==
- West New Guinea dispute
- Papua conflict

== Bibliography ==
- The United Nations and the Indonesian Takeover of West Papua, 1962–1969: Anatomy of a Betrayal by John Saltford (2002) ISBN 0-415-40625-0 (pdf 3.4 MB)
- Drooglever, Pieter J.: Een Daad van Vrije Keuze: De Papoea's van Westelijke Nieuw-Guinea en de grenzen van het zelfbeschikkingsrecht. Uitgeverij Boom, Amsterdam, 2005. ISBN 90-8506-178-4 (Summary)
