= Timeline of the Papua conflict =

Conflict in Indonesia

The following is the broad timeline for major events in the Papua conflict.

== 1960s to 1990s ==
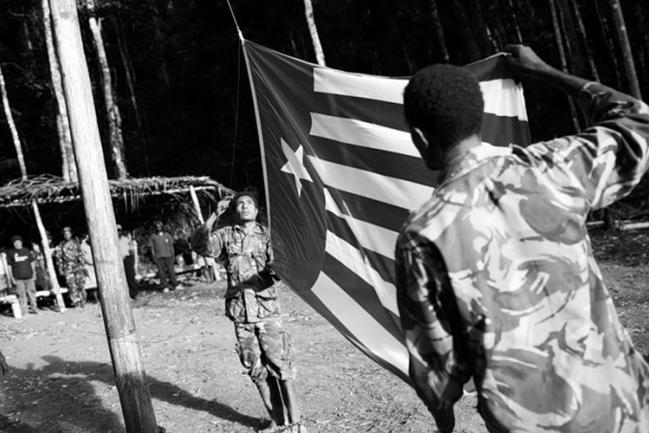
West Papuan independence fighters in 1971

- July 1965: Raids against Indonesian soldiers and barracks in Manokwari known as Arfai incident, resulting in reprisal and suppression campaigns (Sadar Operation).
- In 1966 the Indonesian forces launched the major campaigns against OPM called (Bharatayudha Operations) . The operation resulted in permanently OPM expelled on Manokwari and the expulsion of OPM Battalions on Merauke and Jayapura.
- July–August 1969: Act of Free Choice (Indonesian: Penentuan Pendapat Rakyat, abbreviated as PEPERA) determines Western New Guinea as sovereign territory of Indonesia.
- June 1971: Henk de Mari reported that 55 men from two villages in North Biak were forced to dig their own graves before being shot. Published in Dutch daily De Telegraaf Oct 1974.
- Unknown: 500 Papuan corpses were found in jungle Lereh District, south west of Sentani Airport, Jayapura region.
- 1974: In North Biak, 45 Papuans were killed.
- 1975: In Biak, at least 41 peoples from Arwam and Rumbin villages were killed.
- 1976: A major operation was launched by the Indonesian Army against OPM bases in Jayapura Regency. Over 400 Indonesian soldiers and 1,600 Papuans (fighters and civilians) were reportedly killed.
- 1977: Aerial bombing of Akimuga (McMoRan Exploration Co. mine area).
- 1977–78: Aerial bombing of Baliem Valley.
- Apr 1978: Six unidentifiable bodies were discovered in the Dosai district of Jayapura.
- June 1978: 14 corpses found shot, West of Sentani Airport, Jayapura region.
- Unknown: North Biak, 12 people were shot after receiving permission to leave camp to collect sago for a village feast.
- 1981: 10 Papuans were killed, and 58 disappeared without trace in Paniai Region.
- Jun–Aug 1981: Operasi Sapu Bersih (Clean Sweep Operation); population of Ampas-Waris and Batte-Arso villages were bayoneted and left for dead.
- July 1984: Naval, air, and ground troop assault of Nagasawa/Ormo Kecil village; 200 were killed.
- Unknown: Naval shelling of Taronta, Takar, and Masi-Masi coastal villages; the survivors fled towards Jayapura; under Dutch rule in 1950 each village had a population of 1500 to 2000.
- 1986–87: 34 were killed in Paniai/Wissel Lake District.
- 31 May 1995: 11 refugees on their way to mass were shot and killed by the Indonesian Army, at the Kingmi Protestant Church near Hoya.
- 8 January 1996: OPM militants led by Kelly Kwalik held 26 members of the Lorentz Expedition hostage in Mapenduma. This triggered the Mapenduma hostage crisis (two hostages died) and the 1996 Timika shooting incident on 15 April (14–16 died).
- 15 May 1996: Mapenduma hostage crisis ends with the raid on OPM base in Geselama, Mimika, by Kopassus.
- 6 July 1998: Papuan civilians demonstrating for the independence of West Papua on the Biak Island was killed in a coordinated attack by the Indonesian military and police. Large numbers of demonstrators were detained, many unarmed civilians were tortured and killed, and their bodies dumped at sea in the massacre.

== 2000s ==
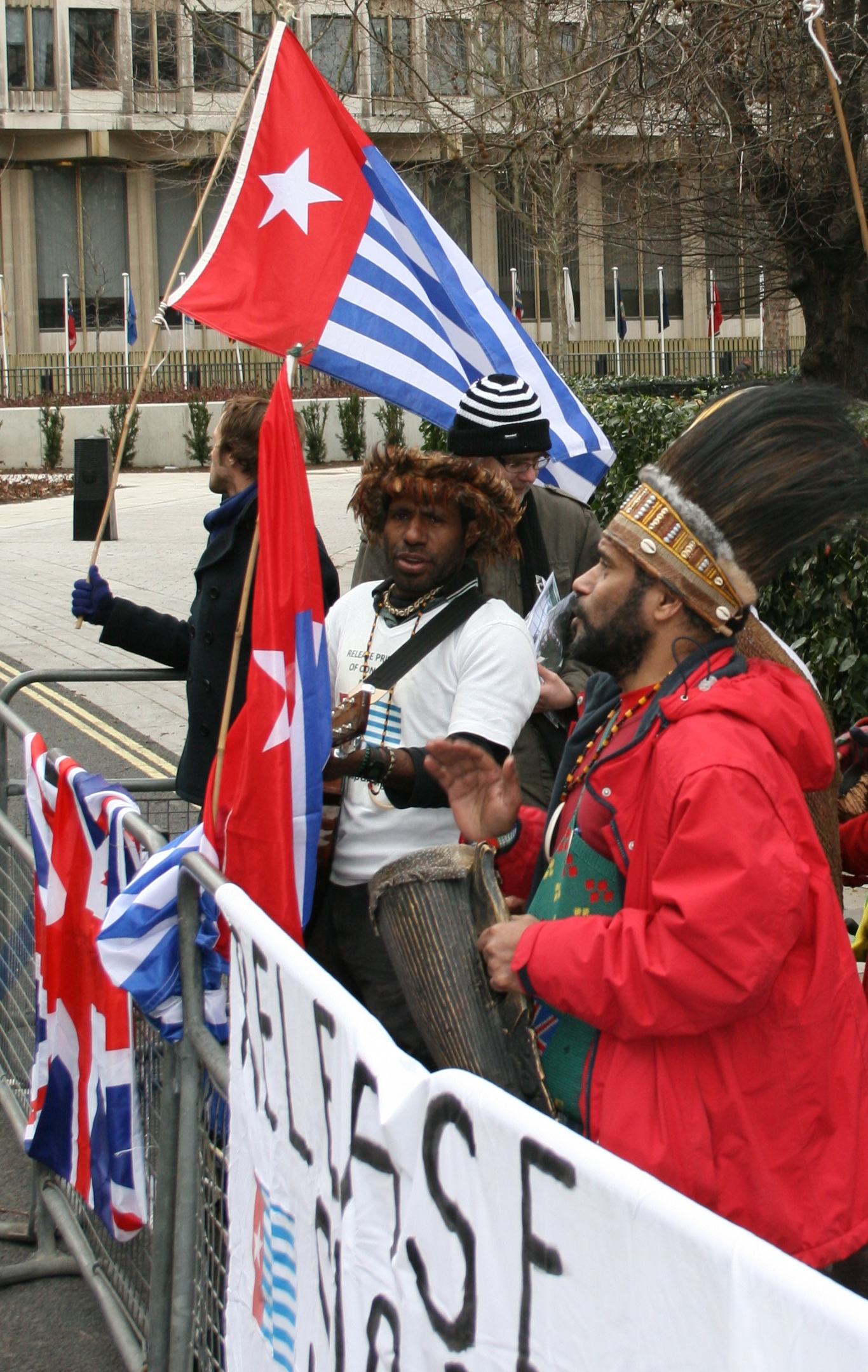
Free West Papua protest in London in 2009

=== 2000 ===
- 6 October 2000: As police raided a flag-raising ceremony in Wamena, two non-Papuans were killed in unclear circumstances. A riot began and moved to a neighbourhood of migrants from outside of Papua, burning and looting shops. Seven Papuans were shot and twenty-four non-Papuans killed.

=== 2001 ===
- 11 November 2001: Two weeks after rejecting the autonomy law as soon as it had passed, the chairman of the Papua Presidium Council, Theys Eluay, was found murdered in his car outside Jayapura after he had been kidnapped.

=== 2002 ===
- 31 August 2002: Gunmen attacked a group of American school teachers and local employees on a sightseeing trip. Three teachers were killed, two Americans (Ricky Lynn Spier and Leon Edwin Burgon) and one Indonesian (Bambang Riwanto); and seven Americans and an Indonesian girl were wounded, including the six-year-old daughter of two of the teachers. Indonesian officials placed responsibility on the OPM; a spokesman for the group denied involvement. On 10 January 2006, Antonius Wamang, JH, MK, DM, AA, GM, JK, EO, and YD were arrested based on fingerprint evidences on all four crime scenes. Wamang was already on police watchlist being the operation commander of Kalikopi faction under Kelly Kwalik.

=== 2003 ===
- 4 April 2003 – 2003 Wamena incident: Following a raid on an Indonesian military armory which killed 2 soldiers, around 7,000 civilians were forcefully relocated and around 50 died.
- 5 November 2003: OPM faction leader Yustinus Murib was killed along with 9 other OPM members near Yalengga in a raid by 60 TNI personnel. SBS Dateline aired a story the day he died featuring him pleading for international intervention from a video tape received days before.
- 1 December 2003: A group of 500 people hoisted the separatist flag, several other actions took place, 42 people were arrested.

=== 2004 ===
- 15 January 2004: Journalist Mark Worth found dead in hotel in Sentani two days after the ABC announced his documentary, Land of the Morning Star, would premier on Australian screens in February 2004
- 15 October 2004: Papuan rebels killed six civilians in an attack in Puncak Jaya.

=== 2006 ===
- 13 February 2006: Formal establishment of Barisan Merah Putih which is a coalescing of earlier formed native pro-Indonesia groups. These include Indonesian Irian Youth Movement (GAPII), Red and White Movement (GMP), Council for the Determination of the Liberation of West Irian (Council for the Determination PEPERA/ DMP), People's Three Command (Trikora), West Irian Veteran Organization, and West Irian Diplomatic Veteran Group in the United Nations.
- 16 March 2006: Three policemen and an airman were killed and 24 other people injured during a clash with Papuan students who had been demanding closure of Freeport's Grasberg mine in Papua.

=== 2008 ===
- 9 August 2008: In Wamena, one man, Opinus Tabuni (a distant relative of Buchtar Tabuni), was killed when Indonesian security forces opened fire in response to the raising of the banned Morning Star flag by activists at a large rally organised by DAP (Dewan Adat Papua – Papuan Customary Council) marking the UN-declared International Day of the World's Indigenous People.
- 4 December 2008: Four Papuans were wounded by gunfire from the police at a demonstration for the independence of West Papua.

=== 2009 ===
- 29 January 2009: At least five Papuans were wounded by shots fired by police during a demonstration.
- 14 March 2009: One Indonesian Army soldier was killed during an attack against a security post in Tingginambut. The OPM was blamed.
- 8 April 2009: Several bombs exploded against a bridge and a refinery on the island of Biak. One person was killed.
- 11–12 April 2009: Fighting between the army and the Papuan resistance left eleven dead, including six members of the security forces. At the same time, a bomb was defused beside a police station in Biak.
- 15 April 2009: An attack against a convoy of police in Tingginambut killed one and wounded six. The OPM was blamed.
- 11 July 2009: An employee of Freeport-McMoRan Copper & Gold Inc.’s Indonesian unit was shot dead in an attack outside the company's mine in Papua.
- July 2009: OPM members hoisted the flag of West Papua in the village of Jugum. Afterwards more than thirty houses were burned by the Indonesian army.
- 16 December 2009: Free Papua Movement (OPM) leader Kelly Kwalik was shot by Indonesian police during a raid in Timika and died in Timika Hospital.

== 2010s ==
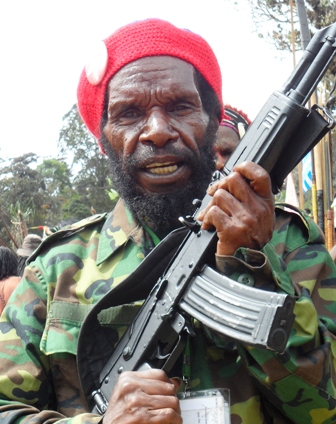
Goliath Tabuni, a commander of the Free Papua Movement, in 2012

=== 2010 ===
- 24 January 2010: Rebels ambushed a convoy of mining company PT Freeport McMoRan employees. Nine people were injured; OPM denied responsibility.
- 1 March 2010: The Australian West Papua Association in Sydney said that the situation in West Papua was deteriorating. Since the previous July there had been fourteen incidents of shootings around the Grasberg mine, Freeport's copper and gold mine. The attacks had killed at least three and injured thirteen.
- 23 March 2010: Rebels attacked an Indonesian military convoy, injuring some of the soldiers.
- May 2010 : The OPM were suspected of killing three workers at a construction site. In retaliation the Indonesian military raided a village leaving at least two dead and a woman raped, while houses in three villages were burned by the military.
- 17 May 2010: The army attacked a base of OPM killing one suspected militant.
- 21 May 2010: Militants attacked members of the Indonesian army near Yambi, 75 km from Mulia. No casualties were reported.
- 15 June 2010: An officer of the Indonesian elite police was shot dead during a patrol. Eight firearms were also stolen by the rebels.
- July 2010: Twelve houses and two churches were destroyed and a woman was raped during an Indonesian army operation to capture Goliath Tabuni.

=== 2011 ===
- 23 June 2011: A police officer from Jayapura was shot by alleged members of the Free Papua Movement.
- 6 July 2011: Three soldiers were shot during a clash with unknown attackers in Kalome village, Tingginambut district.
- 20 July 2011: An Indonesian soldier was killed in an ambush targeting a military security squad in Puncak Jaya district in Papua.
- 31 July 2011: Rebels attacked a car in Papua with guns, axes and knives killing one soldier and three civilians and also wounding seven; OPM denied responsibility.
- 1 August 2011: The National Police said that members of the Free Papua Movement killed four civilians near Tanjakan Gunung Merah, Paniai.
- 2 August 2011: A soldier guarding a military post in Tingginambut was shot dead. In the town of Mulia two shootings targeted the police and military, injuring one soldier.
- 3 August 2011: Separatists shot at an army helicopter as it evacuated the body of a soldier they had allegedly killed.
- 22 October 2011: Al Jazeera published footage of an independence gathering that was attacked by Indonesian security forces. At least five people were killed.
- 2 December 2011: An officer from Jayapura Police office was found dead next to a river after he was allegedly slain by a group wielding arrows and daggers. OPM was blamed.
- 5 December 2011: Two policemen were killed in Puncak Jaya during an exchange of gunfire with suspected members of the Free Papua Movement.
- 12 December 2011: Police attacked the headquarters of a local cell of the OPM. The police seized firearms, ammunition, knives, combat gear, documents, and Morning Star flags, and killed 14 militants.

=== 2012 ===
- In 2012, West Papuan National Committee's (KNPB) Chairman Mako Tabuni died in hospital after sustaining a shooting injury during an arrest attempt by the Jayapura police department.

=== 2013 ===
- 22 February 2013: A military helicopter was damaged by ground fire while attempting to remove the bodies of soldiers killed fighting the OPM earlier. At least three members of the crew were injured. Eight Indonesian soldiers were killed in fighting around the same time.
- 26 December 2013: Gerald Little (an Australian) was sentenced to seven months in prison in Australia for attempting to fight with the OPM. Little was arrested in December 2012 at Brisbane airport by police. Little who had no military training, combat experience or espionage training at the time travelled to Ukraine in August 2012 for a five-day training course run by a private military contractor, the International Bodyguard Association (IBA). The Judge described Little as delusional. Little had been in email communication with the OPM.

=== 2014 ===
- 7 April 2014: A border post between Papua New Guinea and Indonesia was damaged and the border crossing temporally closed after a shootout between the Indonesian Military and "armed civilians". Papua New Guinea local media reported that OPM fighters may have fired from the New Guinea side of the border and were dressed in blue berets to resemble United Nations personnel. No casualties were reported.
- 18 September 2014: In a fire fight between Indonesian Security forces and around thirty OPM members at an airfield in the Lanny jaya district, an OPM member was killed and several people wounded. The group of OPM fighters were suspected to be responsible for shooting dead two policemen in July.
- 13 October 2014: An individual carrying equipment and a large amount of ammunition was apprehended at Sentani airport. The illegal items were found during a routine X-ray after which the suspect attempted escape but was apprehended 200m from the airport. Items seized included 112 5.56-calibre bullets, 20 .56-calibre bullet casings, 13 9-calibre bullets and a single 7.6-calibre cartridge. The police also seized one weapon and a Nokia mobile phone. Earlier, the Papua Police managed to confiscate dozens of home-made weapons and rounds of ammunition during a raid on the OPM's local headquarters. A policeman involved said; "As many as 20 rounds of Mauser ammunition, five home-made weapons, one motorcycle and striped uniforms were confiscated during the raid,".
- 8 December 2014: in the Bloody Paniai case, five youths were killed and 10 to 21 others were injured during an incident in the Paniai district. Government officials said a few hundred protesters attacked local military and police posts, while rights activists accused the military of shooting at unarmed people after several smaller incidents earlier in the day.

=== 2015 ===
- 24 March 2015: General Goliath Tabuni and 23 of his followers surrendered to the Indonesian army in Tingginambut, Puncak Jaya.
- 9 September 2015: Four woodcutters were attacked by armed militants near the border with Papua New Guinea. One of them was killed. Another one was injured while the remaining two were taken hostage and brought to Papua New Guinea. OPM claimed responsibility for the attack and demanded a prisoner exchange with their two comrades who were arrested. The Indonesian government appealed for help to the Papua New Guinean government. The two hostages was released on 18 September 2015, after the militants were arrested by the Papua New Guinea Defence Force.

=== 2016 ===
- 26 January 2016: Ten militants surrendered to the Indonesian Army in Puncak Jaya. They used to be the followers of Goliath Tabuni, who surrendered in 2015. The government is planning to give them amnesty.
- May 2016: Mass demonstrations in support of the United Liberation Movement for West Papua and its efforts to join the Melanesian Spearhead Group began in early May and continued throughout the month. Indonesian police responded by arresting thousands of demonstrators.

=== 2017 ===
- 24 March 2017: 154 guerrilla fighters in Papua province have surrendered to the Indonesian government in a ceremony in Puncak district, the Indonesian army said in a statement.
- 28 March 2017: A West Papuan man who was suspected by authorities as an armed separatist leader was shot dead by the Indonesian police.
- 22 October 2017: A National Police Mobile Brigade officer was shot and killed in Mimika near the Freeport Grasberg mine with an TPNPB unit taking responsibility who were being pursued after they shot at Freeport mine vehicles on 24 September. Police suspected that the TPNPB used Steyr assault rifles. On 21 October, the TPNPB had declared an area near the mine as a battlefield including the villages of Banti and Kimbeli.
- November 2017 – Mimika blockade:
  - 9 November 2017: The military claimed that migrant workers from Indonesia's Sulawesi island in Banti and Kimbeli villages were being held hostage by the TPNPB which was disputed by an Indonesian government minister who said they had been "isolated" by the fighting. The TPNPB denied there were non-native hostages. The TPNPB earlier stated if the military or police take reprisals against innocent Papuans then reciprocal will be done to immigrants residing in PT Freeport area.
  - 15 November 2017: A National Police Mobile Brigade officer was shot and killed in Mimika with an TPNPB unit taking responsibility. Two TPNPB were injured in gunfire on 17 November. Freeport temporarily shut the main supply route to its Grasberg mine complex. A civilian employee of a catering service provider within Freeport died in suspicious circumstances whilst travelling to his village.
  - 17 November 2017: Indonesian police and military evacuated more than 340 Sulawesi migrants from the villages of Banti and Kimbeli. The police stated there was an exchange of gunfire with the TPNPB. Freeport began evacuating mine workers families from the mining town of Tembagapura. Shots had been fired on a Freeport vehicle and two large mining trucks set on fire.

=== 2018 ===
- 12–15 July 2018: A series of gunfights were reported between the wing of the Free West Papua Movement and Indonesian security forces. No casualties were reported.
- 3–17 October 2018: OPM rebel group under Egianus Kogoya leadership had taken 15 migrant teachers and medical workers as hostage for 14 days. One of hostages is reported alternately raped by OPM rebel group. This caused many migrant teachers and medical workers were averse to be returned at Nduga, Papua.
- 2 December 2018: At least 19 workers constructing a bridge at Trans Papua projects were killed by an armed group linked to the West Papua Liberation Organization. One Indonesian soldier is also killed on a separate incident. This event is also known as Nduga massacre.

=== 2019 ===
- 28 January 2019: A Kostrad soldier guarding an airport in Nduga was killed and another was injured following a firefight.
- 7 March 2019: 25 TNI soldiers guarding construction of the Trans-Papua road engaged in a firefight with West Papua National Liberation Army (TPNPB) personnel. TNI spokesmen claimed that 3 soldiers were killed while 7 Liberation Army personnel were killed.
- 2 May 2019: a Polish sympathiser of the West Papua independence movement Jakub Skrzypski was sentenced to five years (later increased to seven years after appeal) in prison for intent to, and preparation to, commit treason. Skrzypski had photographed meetings with the KNPB Mimika faction under Legessy Itlay (alias Stevan Itlay, Stevanus Itlay, Lessy Nelson Faithero Itlay) while carrying an assault rifle, somewhere in Timika, which the prosecution argued because of his experienced in shooting range in Switzerland, he intended to train KNPB members under Itlay. He also had extensive text messages through Facebook and mobile phone, in one instance, agreeing on sourcing weapons from Poland when asked by Simon Magal. In addition, he also met TPNPB Puncak Jaya faction under Goliath Tabuni in Wamena, and TPNPB spokesperson Sebby Sambom in Vanimo, and other (TPNPB or KNPB) members such as Yason Yare Sambom, Edo, Nesta, and Buchtar Tabuni. He is the first foreigner to be convicted of treason in Indonesia. Three of the four police charges were dropped during his trial. He denied he committed treason claiming he was a tourist and it was a show trial.
- 10 July 2019: A human rights group advocating for West Papuans in Indonesia says there were more than 23 extrajudicial killings by the military there last year.
- 12 August 2019: An undercover National Police Criminal Investigation officer was abducted in Usir in Puncak Jaya Regency and later shot dead that day nearby allegedly by a unit led by Lekagak Telenggen after dialogue with the National Police.
- 16 August 2019: A TNI Toyota Hilux travelling on the Trans-Papua Highway in Jayawijaya Regency was ambushed allegedly by a unit led by Egianus Kogoya injuring two soldiers with one later dying in hospital the following day.
- 2019 Papua protests:
  - 19–21 August 2019: Violent protests in Papua's large cities with several demonstrations over three days, which numbered from in the hundreds to the thousands, following a racist incident on Saturday 17 August with Papuan students in a dormitory in the Indonesian province of East Java at Surabaya involving the TNI and Police. 10 government buildings in Manokwari and 15 government buildings in Sorong were destroyed. Indonesia throttled the internet to prevent access to social media in protest areas and from 21 August blocked the internet in Papua. The Morning Star flag was flown in several protests along with protesters crying "Free Papua". Indonesia sent 1200 Police and 300 TNI reinforcements to Papua.
  - 22 August 2019: Protest in Jakarta where demonstrators flew the banned Morning Star flag in front of the Presidential palace singing songs with lyrics demanding Papuan independence.
  - 23 August 2019: Indonesian National Police and Municipal Police were involved in a gun fight at Wamena in Jayawijaya Regency allegedly by a unit led by Egianus Kogoya which suffered a fatality with a National Police officer and Municipal Police officer both shot in the leg.
  - 30 August 2019: Protesters in the eastern region set buildings on fire in the provincial capital of Jayapura. The police fired tear gas to disperse thousands of demonstrators.
  - 24 September 2019: Student protests of alleged racism incident happened in Wamena followed by riots when Kelion Tahuni, a student was shot. Bodies were later found under burned buildings as rioters burn some of the buildings, mostly belonging to non-Papuan migrants according to the Indonesian police. Indonesian police said the death toll had risen to 33 with 8 victims were Papuans and that rebel sympathizers had burned buildings and set fire to vehicles. Some of the Indonesian police's version of these events has subsequently been questioned in an investigative article by two Jakarta Post journalists in which the Papuan victims likely to be higher. Based on testimony of the residents of Hom-hom, they did not recognize the arsonist, which wore high school clothes, and suspect they are not Papuan from Wamena and look too old. The police later confirmed probably they were Papuan armed groups who infiltrated the student protests. The inciting incidents of a teacher remarking a racist comment toward one of the students was later confirmed to be false, by deputy principal of the school. Students from other school receiving the news through messages of the incident. Lukas Enembe, Papuan governor, confirmed one incident where a Papuan student was doused by gasoline and burned for not participating in the riots, the victim was confirmed to be from SMP 1 state junior high school, and remarked the riots were engineered. Another story emerged from SMA 1 state high school from three native Papuans teachers, of student rioters from other school invading the school and inciting the students to riots and throwing stones and hurting some students. The papuan victims of the incident likely to be as high as 17 with 11 people verified dead (3 people were in the Papuan customary list but not on the police list), the police did not confirm if they shot toward the crowd and possibly hitting Kelion Tabuni, but he was later confirmed to be one of the victims. There were many native Wamena Papuans protecting migrants from the rioters and arsonists, as confirmed by regional La Pago customary council chief Dominikus Surabut, who expressed sorry for not being able to help everyone. The protest spread to other cities, and police said hundreds of university students were being questioned about a protest in Jayapura in which a soldier and three civilians were killed. However much of the unrest was in the city of Wamena.
- 17 December 2019: Two soldiers were killed in a shootout with members of West Papua National Liberation Army in Sugapa district. The soldiers were deployed to the region as part of a joint military and police security task force.

== 2020s ==
=== 2020 ===
- 9 October 2020: A joint civilian and security forces investigative team tasked by the Coordinating Minister for Political, Legal, and Security Affairs of Indonesia, was investigating the death of a local priest who was killed on 19 September when they came under fire from hostile militias in Intan Jaya Regency. One of the civilian investigator was injured in the arm along with two other army personnel.
- 20 November 2020: Unidentified group opened fire on two students near the village of Jaiti in North Gome District, Puncak Regency, killing Atanius Wuka (17) and injuring Manus Murib (17). An hour later three civilians were killed, those killed were students Wapenus Tabuni (17) and Warius Murib (12) and civil servant Akis Alom (34). According to Manus, the perpetrators were clad in black helm, black vest, and black shirt. The unidentified men had given them guns to hold and took pictures of them.
- November 2020: UN human rights office said they were concerned with the escalating violence in Papua & West Papua province. As per the report by OHCHR, military, security forces and nationalist militias are involved in the violence, extrajudicial killings and torture of the protesters and human rights defenders. Spokesperson for the Office of the High Commissioner said Indonesian authorities should pursue thorough, independent and impartial investigations into all acts of violence, in particular killings, and ensure all perpetrators were held to account, regardless of their affiliation.

=== 2021 ===
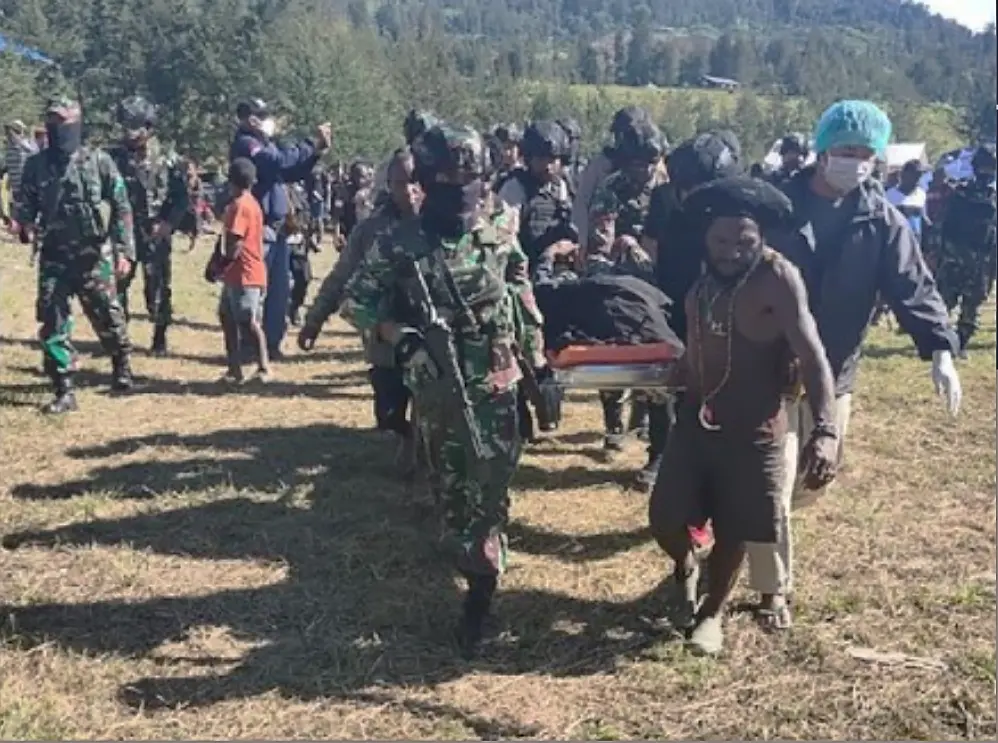
Evacuation of the body of Ali Mom, a Damal highschooler killed by members of Lekagak Telenggen's faction.

- 8 January 2021: KKB admitted that they shot a civilian helicopter and burned an aircraft on Wednesday (6/1). Both aircraft were piloted by foreigners and carried civilian passengers.
- 10 January 2021: Pvt. 2nd Class Agus Kurniawan that served in TNI AD 400th Infantry Battalion was shot and killed after Papuan Separatist Group (OPM/TPNPB) attacked his post in Titigi, Intan Jaya, West Papua.
- 12 January 2021: KKB burned two BTS. Their justification: "We don't accept Indonesian Government facilities in Papua, we don't need communication network"
- 22 January 2021: 2 KIA from the KKB attack: Pvt 1st Class Roy Vebrianto killed in Titigi and Pvt 1st Class Dedi Hamdani killed when chasing Titigi attackers. Both served in TNI AD 400th Inf Batt.
- 30 January 2021: Local pastors confirmed that Papuan Separatist Group (TPNPB/OPM) captured and executed one civilian named Boni Bagau in Agapa Village, Sugapa District, Papua. They accused Bagau for being 'a spy' for government forces.
- 8 February 2021: A 32-year-old civilian named Ramli RN was shot in the face in front of his wife by the KKB. TPNPB's Sabinus Waker Group has claimed responsibility for the attack as they accused Ramli of being TNI/Polri spy.
- 10 February 2021: a brief gun battle broke out between the TNI and OPM forces in Unggul Bridge, Puncak Regency, West Papua. No injuries reported.
- 12 February 2021: One Army TNI AD soldier, Chief Pvt. Hendra Sipayung, was shot in the head after KKB conducted a hit-and-run attack using motorcycles in Sugapa District. Sipayung survived and was evacuated to Jayapura for advanced treatment.
- 9 February 2021: One civilian (ojek/taxi bike driver) named Rusman Heidar was stabbed and killed by a KKB in Ilaga District, West Papua. KKB has claimed responsibility for the attack, saying that the civilian was government spy.
- 15 February 2021: Pvt. 2nd Class Ginanjar from TNIAD 400th IB was shot and killed after Papuan Separatist Group (OPM/TPNPB) attacked his post in Mamba Village, Sugapa District.
- 16 February 2021: Indonesian soldiers tortured to death three brothers at the Sugapa Health Clinic, Janius Bagau (25) who was recovering from injuries he sustained during rioting and his brothers Yustinus Bagau (20) and Soni Bagau (16) both of which were visiting Janius. However Colonel IGN Suriastawa claimed they were member of KKSB, whose name were listed in the declaration of war letter, Janius was identified during the police sweep after the recent shooting and injured in the capture, while he was being treated in Sugapa health clinic, his brothers came and they tried to flee and stole weapons of the soldiers guarding, hence they were shot. Sebby Sambom, spokesperson of TPNPB denied the accusation "It was not true, TNI tortured the two youngster in Sugapa Health Clinic, TNI soldiers tortured then kill the two youngster, this is the report confirmed by all in Sugapa."
- 13 April 2021: The West Papua National Liberation Army has claimed responsibility for shooting dead two teachers in Beoga district. The groups was likely led by Sabinus Waker and Lekagag Telenggen, the first shooting happened on 8 April afternoon, killing Octavianus Rayo, three rooms of SMAN 1 Beoga were burned. On 11 April a further nine rooms were burned. Yonathan Randen, another teacher, was shot later when trying to retrieve the previous victim body. Both bodies were held for ransom, and were released after the local Puncak district paid. Both teachers were shot because they were suspected to be from the military. Indonesian government sometimes used military personnel as teachers in Indonesia to mitigate teacher shortage, both victims are later confirmed to be civilians, though Oktavianus Rayo was commonly seen carrying a hangun when working as a seller.
- 16 April 2021: Ali Mom (16), a local Papuan high school student, was shot and his head was slashed by TPNPB in Ilaga. This was confirmed by Lekagak Telenggen, he accused the boy of being intel for Indonesian military.
- 17 April 2021: There was an arson attack on the house of Dambet village chief as well as education facilities, which includes an elementary school building in Dambet Village, Beoga, Puncak Regency. The house also functioned as village shops and kiosks for villagers. The village head from Dambet tribe, Benner Tinal, conducted a stone burning ceremony, to celebrate that there was no casualty in the arson attack. It was attended by Iqbal Al Qudusy, the local head from Operation Nemangkawi. The perpetrators was strongly suspected to be from TPNPB, as Dambet Village is only 3 km from the previous attack in Beoga district. Klemen Tinal, Papua deputy governor strongly condemn the recent attacks, and requested security personnel to restore law and order in Beoga Sub-district, Puncak District, to enable the local administration to restart its public services.
- 25 April 2021: The local papuan BIN head (Kabinda), Brigadier General I Gusti Putu Danny Karya Nugraha Karya, was shot dead when inspecting Dambet village in the aftermath of recent arson attack.
- 4 June 2021: Benny Wenda accused the Indonesian Soldiers of the Nemanwaki joint security task force shot dead three civilians, Patianus Kogoya (34) and his wife Paiten Murib (43) along with another man Erialek Kogoya (55) in the village of Nipuralome. However the military spokesperson, Reza Nur Patria claimed it was TPNPB who attacked Aminggaru Airport, in Ilaga District, Puncak Regency. TPNPB burned buildings including the airport's ATC, 2 airport's employees houses, an excavator and an aircraft from 5.30 to 8.00 AM. By 11.15 around 50 Niporalme villagers fled to Puncak police station, with the three killed victims (village chief and his family) and another three wounded. On 27 May 2022, Damai Cartenz spokesperson confirmed one of the perpetrator of this attack, Lerinus Murib, member of Bumunggur and Titus Murib KKB faction, was killed by patrols in Trikora field.
- 2 September 2021: 2021 Maybrat attack: Thirty rebels had ambushed soldiers while they were asleep at the Indonesian military post. The post is located in Kisor Village, South Aifat District, Maybrat Regency. Four soldiers — 2nd Sergeant Amrosius, Chief Private Dirham, First Private Zul Ansari, and First Lieutenant Dirman—died in the attack, while two others sustained serious injuries. After the incident, several local residents had fled their homes fearing for their safety. According to the National Commission on Human Rights (Komnas HAM)-Papua Office head, Frits B. Ramandey, preliminary findings indicated that the suspects had launched a well-planned and organized attack. He also thanked Maybrat district head Bernard Sagrim for reassuring local residents following the incident persuading them to return. Besides Komnas HAM, the West Papua police also investigated the case. Eight days after the attack, the West Papua police arrested two suspects identified by their initials as MY (20) and MS (18) and launched a manhunt for 17 others. According to the police, the attack had been thoroughly planned and organized by members of the West Papua National Committee (KNPB) operating in the Kisor neighborhood of Maybrat Regency, led by Silas Ki. Six men accused of launching an attack on a military post in Maybrat Regency will be tried at the Makassar District Court.
- 13 September 2021: A group of TPNPB soldiers led by Lamek Taplo attacked villages in Kiriwok, Pegunungan Bintang Regency, causing injuries to security personnel and killing nurse Gabriela Meilani (22). A number of public buildings in Kiriwok such as the district office, market, teachers' houses, school, bank, doctors' houses, health workers' barracks and clinic were also set on fire, TPNPB later claimed the responsibility. From testimonies of the survivors and healthcare workers, they were harassed, stabbed, beaten and tortured. The nurses were stripped down bare naked by force using machetes, tortured, sexually abused until unconscious and then thrown off a 500 meter deep canyon. Nurses Kristina and Gabriela were found naked at a depth 500 meters deep, Kristina survived and rescued however Gabriela succumbed to her wounds and died. Nine healthcare workers survived and were evacuated to Jayapura. A total of 31 civilians including the healthcare workers survived by seeking shelter in a military post.
- 5 December 2021:TPNPB Ngalum Kupel under Lamek Taplo burned down SMAN 1 Oksibil in district Serambakom, Pegunungan Bintang. Around 235 students were unable to go to school as a result. The same group was trying to burn SMKN 1 Oksibil although managed to be stopped by security forces. A video implicating the group was uploaded online.

=== 2022 ===
- 20 January 2022: One TNI soldier was killed and four wounded in a TPNPB ambush in Maybrat.
- 27 January 2022: Three TNI personnel were killed in a TPNPB attack in Bukit Tepuk, Puncak.
- 4 March 2022: Papuan militants (OPM/TPNPB) claimed responsibility of attack on Telkomsel tower in Beoga District, Puncak Regency, killing eight people. Sebby Sambom claimed all eight victims were member of TNI and Polri. However this was denied by TNI and Polri, and confirmed by local Komnas HAM head, Frits Ramandey, that all eight victims and one survivor were workers for PT. Palapa Timur Telematika (PTT). Perpetrator of this attack are members of TPNPB under Aibon Kogeya. One survivor of the attack is Nelson Sarira, while the other eight killed victims are Bona Simanullang, Billy Garibaldi, Renaltagasye Tentua, Jamaludin, Eko Septiansyah, Syahril Nurdiansyah, Ibo, and Bebi Tabuni, the son of Dani tribal head from Gome, Ilaga District, Abeloni Tabuni, which was confirmed by Abelom Kogoya, general tribal leader of Puncak Regency, both condemned the attack.
- 19 March 2022: TPNPB militants attacked a TNI post in Gome District, Nduga, killing three TNI soldiers. TNI Commander-in-Chief Andika Perkasa claimed that the attack was enabled by the unit's company commander unilaterally deploying troops from the post to provide a security detail for a sand quarry without superior authorisation, in order to receive extra income. The company commander was court-martialed.
- 26 March 2022: TPNPB militants under the command of Egianus Kogoya attacked an Indonesian Marines post in Mupe, Nduga, using firearms and a grenade launcher. Two TNI personnel, including the commander of the post, were killed, and eight others were injured, including two seriously injured.
- 31 March 2022: TPNPB militants attacked a home housing a TNI family in Yalimo, Papua. First Sergeant Eka and his wife were killed, and their two children were injured in the attack.
- 22 April 2022: TPNPB militants attacked an Indonesian marines post in Nduga, killing one soldier and injuring a TNI officer.
- 18 June 2022: Son of footballer Pieter Rumaropen, Diego Rumaropen, a policeman was killed after helping villagers in Napua, Jayawijaya Regency, the attacker hacked his body and stole his and another officer's weapon. The attacker believed to be member of TPNPB under Egianus Kogoya, and later acknowledged by Sebby Sambom with the motive to steal weapons.
- 26 June 2022: A civilian was shot dead by TPNPB militants in Deiyai.
- 29 June 2022: A TNI soldier was killed during a TPNPB attack on a TNI post in Bintang Mountains.
- 16 July 2022: KKB/TPNPB under Egianus Kogoya attacked Nonggolait village, Kenyam District, Nduga Regency, Highland Papua. The attackers opened fire on a grocer, and then shot seven traders riding on a freight truck. Four bystanders were also shot, including indigenous priest of Nonggolait from Kenyam. In total ten civilians were killed, seven of them instantly while three others died later in a clinic and two others critically injured. The head of the National Commission on Human Rights (Komnas HAM) Representative for Papua Region, Frits Ramandey, said the KKB action against residents in Nonggolait Village was an inhumane act and had happened many times. This group is considered so cruel because it attacks residents who are completely helpless. Human rights activist and also the executive director of the Papuan Justice and Human Integrity Foundation, Theo Hesegem, condemned the KKB action that attacked 12 civilians in Nduga. He also argued that KKB's actions were beyond reason because it attacked residents who did not have any firearms.
- 19 July 2022: TPNPB/OPM under Bocor Sobolim beheaded an illegal gold miner in Kawe Village, Awinbon District, Bintang Mountains Regency, and bring the head to their HQ where they make a video recording threatening everyone else that they will kill more.
- 22 August 2022: The mutilated bodies of four Papuan civilians from Nduga Regency were found close to Timika. Their bodies had been put in sacks and thrown into the river. According to the TNI, the victims of the mutilation were TPNPB/OPM sympathizers with one victim with the initials LN confirmed to be part of the Egianus Kogoya arms and ammunition supply network. However, the victims' families and the Regent of Nduga denied and said that the victims were civilians. On 8 October, all perpetrators of the murder consisting of six soldiers (two did not commit murder but received stolen money) and four civilians had been captured by authorities. According to authorities the victims were lured by the perpetrators to purchase AK and SS1 type rifles from the perpetrators with value of up to 250 million rupiah, but were instead murdered and the money stolen.
- 30 November 2022: One Indonesian policeman was killed and four wounded during a TPNPB attack in Yahukimo, Highland Papua.
- 13 December 2022: A civilian named Yeferson Sayuri was killed by an attack by an armed criminal group (KKB) on a police convoy in the Yapen Islands. The victim who died was known to have joined the police group as a chainsaw operator.
- 14 December 2022: A civilian banker from Bank Papua Sinak branch, named Darius Yumame was killed as he was shot in the head by Kalenak Murib while shopping in Sinak traditional market. Police believed the perpetrators to be Kalenak Murib, member of TPNPB. Kalenak Murib was former prison escapee who joined TPNPB. He was currently under customary sanctions by Goliat Tabuni and Lekagak Telenggen, because he was known to kill recklessly.

=== 2023 ===
- 6 January 2023: TPNPB burned down Sentani New Market in Jayapura Regency. The motive was to expel Indonesian migrants living in the area. “TPNPB special forces burned down Sentani New Market on January 6, 2023. We burned in accordance with TPNPB’s order on December 1, 2021 that we will carry out a total revolution and expel all Indonesian immigrants in the Land of Papua,” Sambom said on Sunday, January 8, 2023, forwarding a message from TPNPB special member Dorompet Jelemaken who had burned Sentani New Market.
- January 2023 — Oksibil attacks
  - 7 January 2023: Combined TNI-Polri forces are involved in a shootout with an armed criminal group for two hours long.
  - 9 January 2023: The building of state vocational school SMKN 1 Oksibil is burned by an armed criminal group at around 10:00 AM local time. They also attacked a cargo aircraft while landing from Tanah Merah, Boven Digoel Regency.
  - 11 January 2023: 35th Regional Defense Commando of TPNPB burned a Department of Population and Civil Record (Disdukcapil) office at around 01:30 AM local time.
- 7 February 2023 — Nduga hostage crisis
  - 15 April 2023: A number of TNI AD soldiers engaged in a firefight with TPNPB in Nduga Regency. TPNPB spokesperson Sebby Sambom claimed that nine Indonesian soldiers were killed. TNI confirmed 4 soldiers died during the firefight.
- 6 April 2023: The Indonesian army tortured and killed 17-year-old musician Wity Unue.
- 8 April 2023: TPNPB has burned the office building of Dogiyai regent at Moanemanu, Kamu district at around 12:58 AM.
- 28 April 2023: An armed criminal group led by Pilanus Waker (a.k.a. Water Head) burned four or five houses vacant from March 2022 at Pancuran Road, Kago village, Ilaga district, Puncak Regency, Central Papua, located 200 meters from the residence of Puncak regent, at around 3:28 PM. The fire was only extinguished two hours later. Prior the burning, the houses were originally owned by Ronald Sujardi, Atik Ratnawati, Yakup, and Yusup Bangun, before later leased as a hostel for PT Unggul employees.
- 29 April 2023: Mathius Fakhiri, Papuan police chief, confirmed the fighting in Julukoma between TPNPB groups of Joni Botak's Kalikopi faction with Arodi Kulla and Lewis Kogoya of Undius Kogoya's Intan Jaya faction, resulted in the death of Joni Botak and Olem Uamang, both were accused as Indonesian spies. Willem Wandik, regent of Puncak, claimed the fighting happened because disagreement between migrant Intan Jaya factions with local Kalikopi faction over the shooting of Asian One plane on April 14 carrying local supplies.
- 30 April 2023:
  - Abedeus Tepmul, district head of Kiwirok district, Bintang Mountains Regency, Highland Papua was assaulted by members of TPNPB Ngalum Kupel faction while searching logs with his family. Alongside pointing their guns, they also threatened the civilians not to come into Delpem, Kiwi, Pelbib, dan Lolim villages. Papuan police chief Mathius D. Fakhiri stated that the group has attempted extortion before the assault.
  - Two ethnic Torajans, namely Asri Obet (54) and Yonatan Arruan (45) from Tana Toraja Regency and North Toraja Regency, respectively, were killed by 20 people possibly connected to an armed criminal group after coming from a church at Statistics Road, Dekai district, Yahukimo Regency, Highland Papua, at around 10 AM.
- 4 May: Yahukimo Departmental Police and Cartenz Peace Task Forces have captured nine KKB members and confiscated their weapons at Paradiso Road, Dekai district, Yahukimo Regency, Highland Papua, at 3 am.
- 5 May: KKB involved in a firefight with Indonesian National Army at Sinak Airport, Puncak Regency, Central Papua, at around 8:45 AM.
- 13 May: KKB held hostage of Asmar and Fery, PT. IBS construction workers of a Telkomsel BTS tower; Peas Kulka, Okbab district staff; and Senus Lepitalen, a local from Borme District at Okbab District, Bintang Mountains Regency, Highland Papua. The hostages are evacuated two days later.
- 16 June: Headquarters of a KKB led by Sefnat Marani at Ambaidiru, Yapen Islands Regency, Papua was raided by Cartenz's Peace Task Forces. They found a wooden firearms, a pistol with matches, a camouflaged vest, and the Morning Star flag.
- 22 June:
  - A personnel of Kopasgat Task Forces was shot by local KKB at Kenyam Airport, Nduga Regency, Highland Papua at around 9:25 AM. The head of Cartenz Peace Task Forces, Faizal Ramadhani, claimed that KKB only wanted to show their existence following the inauguration of the new acting Nduga regent, Edison Gwijangge.
  - A member of TPNPB and the Maybrat branch of the National Committee for West Papua, Yanwaris or Titus Sewa was sentenced to 18 years in jail.
- 17 July: KKB attacked Intan Jaya sector police and Homeyo military regional commando forces.
- 29 August: TPNPB group under Egianus Kogoya in Nduga killed Michelle Kurisi Doga, a Papuan woman activist with Gerindra affiliation, and daughter of Silo Karno Doga tribal leader. She was accused of being Indonesian spy, while trying to help Nduga refugees. The video of the killing was recorded by the perpetrators and shared by Sebby Sambom. The body was later found in Kolawa District, Lanny Jaya Regency by security forces on August 31. Later investigation by the police revealed the perpetrators to be seven members of West Baliem branch of KNPB, PM, AW, RK, KW, JW, DW and K.
- 12 September: Police fatally shot four people and arrested seven people from an estimated 24 perpetrators of the killing of Darson Hegemur, Kramomongga District Head and the burning of the district office, primary school SD YPPK Lukas Makmur, and junior high school SMP Negeri 4 Kokas in Fakfak Regency. The perpetrators are affiliated with the local KNPB.
- 15 September: Indonesian Military claimed they fatally shot five TPNPB members while trying to cross Brazza River in Dekai District, Yahukimo Regency. Atias Matuan, priest from local Yahukimo church PGGY claimed these men were Yahukimo civilians not member of TPNPB. Sebby Sambom and Elkius Kobak, leader of TPNPB Yahukimo faction also claimed these men were not TPNPB members and claimed TNI used bombs to kill them. On 16 September, before burying the bodies, local Dekai tribal leader Leo Ghiban inspected their bodies and denied these men were Yahukimo civilians, confirming no families claimed the bodies. Later TNI claimed these men were not local and instead members of Yotam Bugiangge's group from Ndugama faction.
- 19 September: TPNPB members from Ananias Ati Mimin's Bintang Timur faction reported to have burned Serambakon District Market and killed one policeman, Rudi A. Ashari, and in the evening they shot Satpol PP Simon P. Sroyer, and two locals Regina Bitdana and Jonas Kalakmabin in Oksibil District.
- 30 September: Indonesian military reported to have killed five TPNPB members who attacked Serambakon and Oksibil in Pegunungan Bintang Regency and seized their weapons. By October 2, TPNPB released the identity of the five killed members, Lt.Col. Otobius Mimin, Neas Ati Mimin, Otto Kasipka, Alex Lepki, and Tarkus Akmer.
- 16 October: TPNPB claim responsibility in the killings of seven gold miners in Yakuhimo Regency. 11 civilians were evacuated by security forces of Operation Cartenz's Peace, and the bodies of seven miners were recovered, it is believed the group involved in the killings is led by Egianus Kogoya. The names of the seven miners are Udin, Maun, Ardi, Hendra, Appe, Siger, and Anju.
- 19 October: 22 health workers were attacked, as a result 1 worker was killed, with 2 others critically injured, and 19 others suffered serious injuries after TPNPB attacked a Community Health Center (Puskesmas) in Puncak Regency. The surviving workers were evacuated to shelter in a nearby Police Sector station (Polsek).
- 31 October: An accomplice of Egianus Kogoya was arrested by Pandawa Forces of Kostrad.
- 4 November: Kali Ei and Kali Brasa, two headquarters of a KKB faction led by Elkius Kobak located at Yahukimo Regency, Highland Papua, were raided by combined TNI and Polri forces. They found 4 solar cells, 6 generators, 2 handy talkies (HT), 2 air guns, a KKB camouflage clothing, and several sharp weapons. Loots from Amuma Public Health Center were also found.
- 5 November: A member of Mulia Sector Police, shot dead a member allegedly from KKB after pointing a toy gun at Wuyukwi, Mulia district, Puncak Jaya Regency, Highland Papua. He was later investigated by the Professional and Security Division.
- 12 November 2023: Around 200 people from 10 villages from Gome District, Puncak Regency seek shelter and protection in a military post of the 300th Raider Infantry Battalion, and the nearby church in front of the military post, due to fears of the KKB. The villagers are from Jenggernok, Wako, Nenggebuma (Tanah Merah), Agiyome, Upaga, Gome, Jonggong Golawi, Kilanungin, Misimaga, and Tigilobak. A village elder said they were afraid the KKB would shoot them after burning houses and schools in the area.
- 25 December 2023: TPNPB militants attacked a TNI post in Maybrat, killing Second Corporal Hendrianto and critically wounding another TNI soldier.

=== 2024 ===
- 5 January 2024: TPNPB militants shot and killed TNI First Sergeant Afriadi in Taganombak District, Puncak Jaya Regency.
- 19–23 January 2024: 2024 Intan Jaya skirmishes: between these dates TPNPB, under Apen Kobogau of the Intan Jaya faction, attacked numerous locations in Intan Jaya. The attack began on 19 January with shootings at Bilogai Village staff, which killed Damai Cartenz personnel named Steven Karamoy in Mamba village, Sugapa District. On 20 January TPNPB attacked the TNI post belonging to Batalyon Yonif 330/TD. In this attack, Jaringan Belau, Oni Kobogau, and Agustia of TPNPB were shot by security officers. This information is based on police informants in Yoswa Maisani's group. In retaliation, TPNPB burned local houses, including one belonging to a member of the Intan Jaya regional representative (DPRD). On 20–21 January TPNPB attacked a TNI post in Mamba Atas Village. In this attack, Yusak Sondegau was killed, Kanus Kogoya of TPNPB was shot, and Apriani Sani (a civilian) was shot but survived. In retaliation, TPNPB burned houses belonging to Intan Jaya Regency. In this attack, Zakius Sondegau, a member of the TPNPB, was killed. In follow-up shootings between Damai Cartenz security personnel and TPNPB on 23 January, TPNPB members Melkias Matani and Harisatu Nambagani were killed. There were disagreements regarding Yusak Sondegau's identity; some claimed he was a farmer from Yokatapa Village or a government official in Buwisiga Village in Homeyo District, while TNI spokesperson claimed he was member of KKB and had been on the criminal record as underling of Apen Kobogau and involved in previous attacks.
- 3 February 2024: Omukia public health center in Omukia District, Puncak Regency was attacked and burned by TPNPB Kepala Air faction under Jacky Murib. In the pursuit, Damai Cartenz personnel captured AM and Definus Kogoya, while Warinus Murib died from his injury; they were later identified as member of Numbuk Telenggen's group. In retaliation at night, TPNPB burned another public health center in Erobaga Village, Omukia District. A video containing the torture of Kogoya in a barrel later went viral, the military police subsequently arrested 13 soldiers involved in the incident.
- 17 February 2024: A Wings Air ATR 72-600 PK-WJT flying from Sentani to Nop Goliat Dekai Airport in Yahukimo was shot from the direction of the Brazza River while landing. The bullet penetrated the aircraft and hit seat 19A, although no passengers or crews were harmed. On February 23, Damai Cartenz personnel were involved in a shootout while conducting a sweep in the Brazza River and killed Otniel "Bolong" Giban, a member of Yotam Bugiangge's KKB group and capture MH (15) and BGE (15), who were designated as witnesses because both were underage. Captured with them were 74 rounds of 5.56 caliber ammunition and 2 SS1 magazines, cash totaling 3,050,000 rupiah, 1 solar cell, morning star noken, 2 Oppo cellphones, 1 Nokia cellphone, 1 wrench, 2 charging plugs, and 1 type C cable.
- 18 February 2024: Alenus "Kobuter" Tabuni member of Numbuk Telenggen's KKB group was captured in Ilaga District, Puncak, Central Papua. He was involved in the burning of PT Unggul basecamp; the killing of Udin, an ojek driver; the attack on Gome District head Nius Tabuni and shootings with TNI soldiers in Gome District, the burning of tourism buildings around Aminggaru airport in Ilaga District, the killing of Habel Alengpen, and other shootings.
- 1 March 2024: Sebby Sambom, claimed TPNPB had shot two people in Mamba Village, Intan Jaya: first a civilian by the name of Nelson Sani (15), who died immediately, and then a soldier who survived and underwent treatment. He claimed that Sani and his family were spies for Indonesian security forces. Nelson Sani was the cousin of Yunus 'Jabunemala' Sani, a civilian who was also killed by TPNPB on 29 May 2020 accused of being a spy.
- 17 March 2024: TPNPB militants ambushed a TNI motorcycle convoy in Muara District, Puncak Jaya. In the attack, Marine First Sergeant Ismunandar was killed.
- 20 March 2024: Two Papuan policemen, Bripda. Arnaldobert F. J. V. Yawan and Bripda. Sandi D. Sayuri were killed defending Helipad 99 in Ndeotadi, Baya Biru District, Paniai Regency, Central Papua from attack by Aibon Kogoya's KKB group (Dulamo Battalion).
- 22 March 2024: TPNPB militants under the command of Egianus Kogoya shot and killed TNI Chief Private Riadi when he was guarding Milawak Airport in Puncak.
- 30 March 2024: Jhonsep Salempang was assaulted to death by the Yahukimo faction of TPNPB led by Elkius Kobak at Bandara Road, Dekai, Yahukimo Regency, Highland Papua while working as a water gallon deliverer.
- 5 April 2024: A shootout with Damai Cartenz personnel in Kali Kabur, Mile 69, Tembagapura, Mimika Regency, led to the death of Abu Bakar Kogoya (alias Abu Bakar Tabuni) and Damianus Magay (alias Natan Wanimbo) of TPNPB-OPM from Intan Jaya faction of Undius Kogoya. ABK had been implicated in previous attacks such as the shooting of Bripda. Mufadol and Bripda. Almin and LWB car in 2017, and the killing of Graeme Thomas Weal, a New Zealander, and the injuring of two other civilians in 2020.
- 11 April 2024:
  - The Regional Military Commandant 1703 - 04 of Aradide district, 2nd Lt. Inf. Oktovianus Sogalrey was shot to death by the Paniai faction of OPM led by Matias Gobay. The perpetrator, Anan Nawipa, was arrested by Cartenz's Peace personnels at the Bapauda village, Paniai Regency, Central Papua on 11 May, exactly a month after the incident.
  - Damai Cartenz personnels shot dead two KKB members: Toni Wetapo, member of Yotam Bugiangge's KKB group, and Afrika Heluka, member of Kopi Tua Heluka's KKB group, and arrested 6 other people believed to be active KKB members in Yakuhimo Regency, Highland Papua. Toni Wetapo was involved in the 16 October 2023 killings of gold-diggers and 14 February 2024 shooting of Wings Air aircraft, while Afrika Heluka was involved in several notable KKB attacks of 2022 and 2023: the killing of Brigpol.Usnandar on 29 November 2022, the shootings of Damai Cartenz personnels on 30 November 2022, the attack on Yakuhimo Resort Police Force Headquarter on 30 December 2022, the attack on Dandim 1715/Yakuhimo on 1 March 2023, and the shooting of a Trigana Air aircraft on 11 March 2023.
- 15 June 2024: Indonesian Army Chief Private Henrik Fontanaba was killed by OPM militants in an ambush in Puncak, Central Papua.
- 13 July 2024: The Free Papua Movement (OPM) carried out acts of terror in Papua by burning down all elementary, middle, high, and vocational school in Kampung Borban, Okbab District, Pegunungan Bintang Regency. The incident, which occurred on 13 July 2024, was documented in a video showing three men setting fire to wooden desks and chairs inside a classroom. The video also captured the school building engulfed in flames. The perpetrators, identified as members of the TPNPB-OPM led by Ananias Ati Mimin, were seen posing with firearms and the Morning Star flag after the arson.
- 31 July 2024: The Free Papua Movement (OPM) tortured and killed a truck driver named Abdul Muzakir (32 years old) who was driving a truck was about to pick up wood in Masi Village, while carrying 16 villagers. Head of Public Relations for the Operation Cartenz's Peace Task Force, Senior Commissioner of Police Dr. Bayu Suseno said that the identity of the victim, the truck driver, was Abdul Muzakir from Lendang Nangka, East Lombok Regency, West Nusa Tenggara (NTB). He was domiciled on Jalan Paradiso, Dekai District, Yahukimo Regency. The victim Abdul died from injuries while escaping and was evacuated to Dekai Regional Hospital. Meanwhile, his colleague Neri Ommu survived and reported the attack to the authorities. According to the victim Neri, they were intercepted by six KKB members. The perpetrators from the authorities' investigation often act in the Yahukimo area.
- 5 August 2024: The Free Papua Movement took hostage and killed Glen Malcolm Conning a 50 year old New Zealand national and pilot for PT. Intan Angkasa Air Service. Head of the Operation Cartenz's Peace, Brigadier General Faizal Ramadhani, confirmed that the pilot was killed upon landing. The helicopter was carrying four passengers, consisting of two health workers, two adult civilians, a baby, and a child.
- 15 August 2024: Indonesian Army Chief Sergeant Jefri E. May, a native Papuan, was killed by OPM militants during the launching event for the 2024 Indonesian local elections in Pagaleme District, Puncak Jaya, Highland Papua.
- 21 September 2024: Philip Mehrtens, a Susi Air pilot from New Zealand who had been taken hostage by the West Papua National Liberation Army in Nduga Regency in 2023, is freed.
- 26 September 2024: Four personnel from the Ilu Police Station in Puncak Jaya were ambushed on a road. First Police Brigadier Kiki Supriyadi was killed in the ambush.
- 9–13 October 2024: Alex Sondegau, a mentally disabled man disappears after having been arrested by the Indonesian military, he is believed to have been tortured to death.Three days later two high schoolers are arrested and allegedly tortured. One of the teens was released while the other has been reported missing, the next day two more teens are arrested and tortured, one which Pianus Sani (18) was allegedly executed, all three of the incidents occurred in Mamba village.

=== 2025 ===
- 1 January 2025: Head of the Operation Cartenz's Peace, Brigadier General Faizal Ramadhani, reported that 27 West Papuan militants have been killed by the Indonesian security forces in 2024, along with 35 bases.
- 8 January 2025: West Papuan militants under the command of Aske Mabel killed two civilians in Elelim District, Yalimo, Highland Papua.
- 17 January 2025: First Police Brigadier Iqbal Anwar Arif was killed in an ambush by West Papuan militants under the command of Aske Mabel in Elelim District, Yalimo, Highland Papua. This marks the first fatality of the Indonesian security forces in 2025.
- 21 January 2025: Police Brigadier Ronald M Enok was shot and killed by TPNPB militants under the command of Bumiwalo Telenggen in Puncak Jaya Regency.
- 19 February 2025: Aske Mabel, the commander of Baliem Timur Yali-Yalimo faction was captured in Yalimo Regency.
- 21 March 2025: Elkius Kobak, the commander of Yahukimo faction, claimed to have attacked and killed migrant teachers and health workers from East Nusa Tenggara and Southwest Papua in Angguruk District. They also burned education facilities. Kobak claimed that they were spies and TNI members, a claim denied by the survivors and the Indonesian military. Of the seven victims, Rosalia Sogen died, while the other six survived with severe injuries. The Indonesian Catholic Education Assembly (MPK) criticized the attack as a human rights violation.
- 6–7 April 2025: Yahukimo massacre: TPNPB militants attacked multiple illegal gold panning sites in Yahukimo Regency and killed 15 civilian gold miners.
- 27 April 2025: Fritz Ramandey, the head of Papuan branch of National Commission on Human Rights and his team was shot at in Rawara River. Deny Moos from Sorong Raya faction claimed responsibility for the attack, he also claimed to have killed two TNI soldiers in the incident.
- 10 May 2025: Indonesian Military killed Nekison Enumbi, also known as Bumi Walo, one of the leaders of the TPNPB's Yambi Faction.
- 14 May 2025: Indonesian Military claimed eighteen suspected West Papua National Liberation Army militants are killed in a clash with government forces in Intan Jaya Regency, Central Papua. In addition three civilians (RW, EW, MT) were dead, three more (JJ, OW, MJ) were injured in the crossfire. TPNPB-OPM initially acknowledged three (GK, NL, KK) were killed, two (NM, TW) were injured, but later acknowledged NM was dead, and three more (MW, SW, KP) were injured. Seven more were not acknowledged either as civilians or member of TPNPB-OPM.
- 16 May 2025: Two police officers are killed by the West Papua National Liberation Army in Puncak Jaya Regency, Central Papua.
- 4 June 2025: TPNPB/OPM militants under the command of Egianus Kogoya committed a drive-by shooting that killed two construction workers in Kuantapo Village, Asotipo District, Jayawijaya Regency.
- 16 June 2025 : Indonesian Military killed 2 militants of the Egianus Kogoya-led TPNPB's Regional Defence Commando III during a raid in Yakuhimo
- 16–17 June 2025: TPNPB/OPM militants under the command of Elkius Kobak conducted multiple attacks against civilians and security forces in Yahukimo Regency. The militants first attacked Samboga Village, Seradala District, killing one and critically wounding one non-Papuan migrant civilians. Around the same time, the group shot and killed TNI Chief Sergeant Segar Mulyana who worked as a TNI medical personnel. The next day, the group attacked and injured a migrant civilian in the same area.
- 17–18 June 2025: TPNPB militants under the command of Kalenak Murib entered Yugumuak, Puncak Regency, Central Papua, burning homes and killing 3 civilians and injuring 4 others.
- 5 July 2025: Enos Tipagau, a battalion commander of the TPNB's Soanggama Faction, was shot dead by the Indonesian Military
- 11 July 2025: Police arrested 8 members of the Eden Sawi Battalion under the Elkius Lobak-led TPNPB Regional Defence Commando XVI Yakuhimo. They are believed to be responsible for the March 21, 2025 attack of migrant teachers and health workers.
- 19 July 2025 : Indonesian Police arrested Male Telenggen, a member of the Lekagak Telenggen-led TPNPB Yambi Faction.
- 31 July 2025 : Indonesian Military killed Ado Wanimbo, Commander of Ugimba under the TPNPB's Regional Defence Commando VIII Kemabu, along with 2 other TPNPB militants in Puncak.
- 5 August 2025: Indonesian Military killed Mayer Wenda, the Deputy Commander of TPNPB's Lanny Jaya Faction, along with one other TPNPB member.
- 7 August 2025 : Nowaiten Telenggen, also known as German Ubruangge, a member of the Egianus Kogoya-led TPNPB unit, was arrested by the Indonesian Police.
- 13 August 2025: Two Brimob police officers: Police Brigadier Arif Maulana and Second Brigadier Nelson Rumaki, were killed in a drive-by shooting by TPNPB militants under the command of Aibon Kogoya while providing security for the construction of a road in Nabire Regency, Central Papua. Two AK-101 rifles were seized by the assailants.
- 15 August 2025 : Indonesian Police arrested Konara Enumbi, a member of the Tengah Mati Enumbi-led TPNPB Regional Defence Commando Yambi. He was believed to be the one responsible for the killing of the Police Brigadier Ronald M Enok on January 21, 2025.
- 20–21 September 2025: TPNPB militants killed seven gold miners in Yahukimo Regency, Highland Papua. Five others survived the attack.
- 6 October 2025: Indonesian Military killed Mayu Waliya, the Operational Commander of the TPNPB's Lanny Jaya Faction.
- 11 October 2025: TPNPB militants under the command of Deny Moos ambushed and killed TNI Chief Private Amin Nurohman in North Moskona District, Bintuni Bay Regency, West Papua Province. On the same day, a separate TPNPB unit engaged a TNI border guard unit in Bintang Mountains Regency, Highland Papua, killing Second Lieutenant Fauzy Ahmad Zulkarnain.
- 15 October 2025: Attack on Soanggama - Fourteen were killed during a six-hours battle between TNI and OPM separatists in Intan Jaya Regency, Central Papua. Among the dead are Agus Kogoya, the Chief of Operations Staff of TPNPB's Regional Defence Commando VIII Soanggama; Ipe Kogoya, the younger brother of the regional commando's leader (Undius Kogoya), and Zakaria Kogoya. The Indonesian military and the Soanggama village chief claimed that all of those killed were militants, while the OPM claims that nine civilians and three militants are among the dead. However according to the Intan Jaya conflict mediation team, fifteen people died in the clash and six people were TPNPB-OPM members.
- 18 October 2025: TPNPB militants under the command of Aibon Kogoya shot at civilian Hilux driving in Wadio Atas, West Nabire District, killing Masturiyadi (50), and wounding Yance Makai (38), Aser Kegou (45), Martinus Makai (42) and Ari.
- 19 October 2025: Sebby Sambom announced the death of Lamek Alipky Taplo, the commander of TPNPB's Regional Defence Commando XV Ngalum Kupel, in Kiwirok, Pegunungan Bintang, Highland Papua. He was killed alongside three other TPNPB members by an Indonesian drone strike at 6 am Eastern Indonesia time.
- 23 October 2025: Sebby Sambom announced the death of "Brigadier General" Undius Kogoya, the commander of TPNPB's Regional Defence Commando VIII Intan Jaya, in Wandai District due to illness.
- 6 November 2025 : Jayainus Pogau, also known as Supi Pogau, the Commander of the Hetobia Battalion under the Aibon Kogoya-led TPNPB's Regional Defence Commando III Nduga was arrested by the Indonesian Police.
- 7 November 2025 : Indonesian Military killed Lipet Sobolim (also known as Cocot Sobolim and Junior Sobolim), Commander of the Fire Ant Battalion under the TPNPB's Regional Defence Commando Yakuhimo.
- 22 November 2025 : Indonesian Police arrested Maam Taplo, a member of TPNPB's Regional Defence Commando XV Ngalum Kupel, in Keerom Regency. Taplo was previously wanted by the Police for his involvement in the killing of a nurse, Gabriella Meilani in 2021.

=== 2026 ===
- 15 January 2026 : Indonesian military forces rescued 18 workers of Freeport Indonesia who had been surrounded for three days by the Free Papua Movement in Tembagapura, Central Papua, while repairing an electric tower. The evacuation was conducted without reported gunfire amid ongoing tensions linked to the Papua insurgency.
- 2 February 2026 : Construction worker Daniel Datti (41) was killed at a school in Yahukimo Regency when the school was attacked by three armed militants.
- 11 February 2026 : The pilot and co-pilot of a small commercial Smart Air plane were shot and killed during landing. Sebby Sambom claimed "the pilot was killed because this airline often carried Indonesian security forces throughout Papua". Another attack occurred on the same day that targeted a Freeport Indonesia convoy, killing a soldier and injuring a Freeport employee and an officer.
- 21 February 2026: TPNPB militants under the command of Aibon Kogoya attacked mining facilities in Makimi District, Nabire, Central Papua. A security post was burned, killing two individuals: a security guard and Second Sergeant Hamdani (36) of the TNI. 240 workers were evacuated, including 26 Chinese nationals.
- 11 March 2026: TPNPB militants ambushed a Freeport McMoRan truck at the Grasberg minesite. One employee was killed and another was wounded.
- 23 March 2026: TPNPB militants ambushed an Indonesian Marines patrol in South Aifat District, Maybrat, Southwest Papua. Two personnel: second Privates Eki Saputra and Andi Suvio were killed in the ambush, and another soldier was critically wounded. The TPNPB seized two rifles belonging to the killed soldiers in the ambush.
- 2 July 2026: TPNPB rebels shot dead US pilot Nicholas F. Gosselin and burned his plane after it landed in Yahukimo, Papua. The plane carried seven passengers and the TPNPB alleged it was used to carry Indonesian troops and that the killing sent "a message" to the Indonesian and US governments.
- 3 July 2026: A video was posted showing TNI soldiers retrieving the body of US pilot Nicholas F. Gosselin. It was reported by Brigadier General Riyanto the deputy commander of the TNI Habema Joint Operations Command that a "rapid seizure special operation" was conducted to secure the body.
- 15 July 2026: National Commission on Human Rights stated that to date in 2026, 59 individuals have been killed in the Papuan conflict across all areas, consisting of 43 civilians, 8 Indonesian security personnel, and 8 TPNPB militants.
- 16-17 July 2026: Indonesian security forces engaged TPNPB militants in Yahukimo, killing three TPNPB militants and seizing three rifles.
- 20 July 2026: Police Brigadier Fredi Lukas Awes, a native Papuan, was fatally stabbed in Yahukimo. The TPNPB claimed responsibility for the incident. TPNPB also executed three native Papuans whom they claim to be working for the Indonesian authorities. These allegations have not been substantiated.
- 17 August 2026: Mimika hostage crisis: TPNPB militants attacked an Indonesian independence day event in Jila District, Mimika Regency, killing one TNI personnel and one civilian, as well as kidnapping nine local women and girls. One abductee later died in an escape attempt.
- 9 September 2026: Three civil servant candidates employed by the Jayawijaya Regency government's agricultural department were killed by TPNPB militants when their vehicle was stopped at a checkpoint. Eight other passengers (indigenous Papuans) were unharmed.
- 3-29 October 2026: Operation Badai Kasuari 3: TNI forces undertook a major offensive to destroy TPNPB forces in Maybrat Regency, Southwest Papua.
  - 3 October: Two TPNPB militants were killed by the TNI.
  - 9 October: TPNPB commander Manfret Fatem and two others were killed by the TNI.
  - 29 October: Three TPNPB militants were arrested by the TNI.
- 18 October 2026: Four TNI soldiers died in a vehicle crash in Yalimo Regency, Highland Papua.
