= Yahukimo massacre (2023) =

- Part of Papua Conflict
- Yahukimo Regency within Highland Papua
- Location: Yahukimo Regency, Highland Papua, Indonesia
- Date: 16 October 2023; 13:30 WIT (04:30 UTC)
- Target: Gold miners
- Attack type: Attack on migrant workers
- Weapons: Firearms, bows and arrows, machetes
- Deaths: 13
- Injuries: 7
- Perpetrator: West Papua Liberation Organization
- No. of participants: 30

The Yahukimo massacre occurred on 16 October 2023 in Seradala District, Yahukimo Regency, Highland Papua, Indonesia. The attack, carried out by a group of West Papuan separatist militants under the name West Papua National Liberation Army, killed 13 civilian gold miners.

== Background ==
In 1963, Indonesia annexed West Papua (then called West Irian) from the Netherlands, sparking a long-running separatist conflict. A key point of contention has been the large influx of non-Papuan migrants, especially through the government’s transmigration program, which by 2000 had relocated around 306,447 people (mostly from Java) into West Papua, contributing to the displacement of Indigenous Papuans. By 2010, 1.72% of Yahukimo Regency’s population consists of non-Papuans, many of whom work as gold panners in the region’s resource-rich rivers.

Non-Papuan migrants and workers have often been targeted by the West Papua National Liberation Army (TPNPB), the armed wing of the Free PapuaOrganization (OPM), though its various factions operate largely independently. Attacks on migrant workers are relatively common, with notable incidents including the 2017 blockade in Mimika targeting non-native Papuan villages and the 2018 Nduga massacre targeting migrant construction workers, both directed against non-Papuan populations.

== Massacre ==
On Monday, 16 October 2023, at 1.30pm West Papua time, 30 TPNPB militants under the command of Asbak Kobanue, a lieutenant of Egianus Kogoya (who is the commander of a TPNPB battalion and perpetrator of the 2018 Nduga massacre, among other atrocities committed against civilians) attacked a gold mining site in Kali I, Seradala District, Yahukimo Regency. The gold mining operations in the site were known to be conducted illegally and 52 miners were present at the time. According to eyewitness accounts, the attackers, using a Pindad SS1 rifle, bows and arrows, and machetes, split into two groups, with the first group attacking the mining camps and the second group destroying heavy equipment. Seven miners were initially reported dead and seven more wounded, as well as three excavators and two trucks used in mining operations.

On Monday evening, two survivors of the attack fled to an Indonesian security post and reported the attack to the Indonesian authorities. On Tuesday, 17 October, a combined Indonesian security forces team under the command of Major (Mar) Hariono moved into the location to evacuate the survivors and the deceased. The evacuation mission came under fire from retreating TPNPB militants, who according to Indonesian security forces, possessed five firearms. Over the next two days, Indonesian security forces managed to evacuate 45 survivors (20 on Wednesday, 18 October and 25 on Thursday, 19 October). By the end of the operation, Indonesian security forces had evacuated 82 survivors from the location.

All victims of the massacre came from other regions of Indonesia, with six coming from South Sulawesi and one from North Sumatra.

Later, on 27 October 2023, a police patrol found the remains of six more murdered miners, some distance away from the initial site of the TPNPB attack but still along the same river.

Between the two locations, the origins of the victims of the massacre were as follows:

Province	Number
South Sulawesi	8
North Sumatra	1
Southeast Sulawesi	1
East Nusa Tenggara	1
Unknown	2
Total	13

The remains of the deceased were buried in Dekai, the capital of Yahukimo province.

== Aftermath ==
In response to the attack, the head of the Operation Cartenz's Peace Police Chief Commissioner Faizal Ramadhani vowed to "chase" the perpetrators and bring Egianus Kogoya to justice.

The massacre was the first out of two major massacres conducted by Egianus Kogoya's group against non-Papuan gold miners in Yahukimo, with the second being perpetrated in 2025.
