= Yahukimo massacre =

Yahukimo massacre may refer to:

- Yahukimo massacre (2023)
- Yahukimo massacre (2025)
