= Avianto =

Avianto is a surname. Notable people with the surname include:

- Lucky Avianto (born 1974), Indonesian army general
- Upi Avianto (born 1972), Indonesian screenwriter and film director
