= October 2026 Maybrat offensive =

Part of Papua conflict

- Part of Papua conflict
- Maybrat Regency in Indonesian Papua
| Date | 3–29 October 2026 (3 weeks and 5 days) |
| Location | Maybrat Regency, West Papua, Indonesia |
| Result | Indonesian victory; TPNPB commander Manfret Patem killed; Destruction of TPNPB's 4th Regional Defence Commando and four battalions |

Belligerents
| Indonesia | (Free Papua Movement) West Papua National Liberation Army |

Commanders and leaders
| Lt. Gen. Lucky Avianto; Lt. Col. Laili Nugroho | Manfret Fatem † |

Units involved
| TNI; Koops TNI Habema; 9th Marine Infantry Battalion | 4th Regional Defence Commando; Karef Hamit Battalion; Mosata Battalion; Ayosami Battalion; Aikum Battalion |

Strength
| Unknown | 10+ |

Casualties and losses
| None | 5 killed 3 captured |

The October 2026 Maybrat offensive, codenamed Operation Badai Kasuari 3 (Indonesian: Operasi Badai Kasuari 3) were a series of actions taken by the Indonesian National Armed Forces (TNI) against elements of the separatist West Papua National Liberation Army (TPNPB) in Maybrat Regency, Southwest Papua, on October 2026. The offensive successfully eliminated the bulk of TPNPB forces in Maybrat Regency and decapitated its command structure, including commander Manfret Patem.

== Background ==
=== Escalation (2021-2026) ===
Maybrat is one of the six municipalities in Southwest Papua, part of Indonesian Papua. It is the only landlocked regency in the province also its most remote, with its closest point to the ocean (the Seram Sea) being 30 kilometres (18.6 miles) from the coast.

TPNPB units in Maybrat were organised under 4th Regional Defence Commando Sorong Raya (Komando Daerah Pertahanan IV Sorong Raya), which was formed sometime in 2020 in Maybrat, initially under the command of Denny Mos but later taken over by his erstwhile deputy Manfret Fatem. Some of the leading members were originally political activists from the West Papua National Committee (KNPB) chapters in Aifat areas, Maybrat.

Hostilities between the TNI and TPNPB in Maybrat intensified after September 2021 when TPNPB militants under the command of Manfret Patem attacked a TNI post in Kisor, South Aifat district, killing four TNI soldiers. Over the next five years, Manfret Fatem's unit were responsible for numerous attacks on civilian and military infrastructure in Maybrat Regency, including a fatal attack killing one TNI personnel on January 2022, another ambush killing one TNI personnel on December 2023, and an attack on a civilian road construction crew killing four on September 2022. On March 2026, Manfret Fatem's unit killed two TNI soldiers and seized their rifles. Altogether, after the initial TPNPB attack on September 2021, Manfret Fatem's unit were responsible for six TNI personnel and four civilians.

Aside from lives directly lost, the escalation in Maybrat started a major refugee and humanitarian crisis in the area. The National Commission on Human Rights estimated that around 5,200 civilians in Maybrat were forced to flee the area after the initial 2021 attack, and four districts (Far East Aifat, South-East Aifat, Middle-East Aifat, and East Aifat) remained deserted by August 2023. By October 2023, 138 refugees had died, and as of October 2026, 262 refugees remained outside of their homes.

=== Shifting TNI strategy ===
After the election of former Minister of Defence Prabowo Subianto as president, the Indonesian government changed its strategy against the TPNPB. On April 2024, the TNI revoked the designation of Armed Violent Group (Kelompok Kekerasan Bersenjata, KKB) from the TPNPB/OPM, a move which according to an analyst justified a shift from a law enforcement-based strategy to a military counter-insurgency-based strategy.

The TNI also shifted its strategy from depending on static military infrastructure (which led to the September 2021 attack) to a proactive tracking strategy and a systematic destruction of TPNPB bases, as well as recapturing weapons which the TPNPB had seized from TNI soldiers killed in ambushes. Under Operation Habema (established 2024), elite TNI units spearheaded destruction of whole TPNPB units, such as in the 2025 attack on a TPNPB base in Soanggama which killed up to 14 TPNPB militants.

On May 2024, 30 militants under Manfret Fatem's unit surrendered to the TNI, severely reducing its strength. By April 2026, it was reported that Manfret Patem unit's core strength had been reduced to seven militants.

== Offensive ==
=== 3 October ===
On the evening 3 October 2026 in Aifat District, Maybrat, a TNI force came under hostile fire from Fatem's unit after negotiations failed. In the firefight, two TPNPB militants, including Yohanes KY, commander of the 'Karef Hamit Battalion', were killed. Fatem and other militants successfully fled the scene, leaving behind a revolver, blades, and ammunition.

=== Badai Kasuari 3.10 ===
Over the next few days, TNI forces pursued Fatem's remaining force under the codename Operation Badai Kasuari 3.10. On 9 October, Fatem and his men were spotted hiding in a jungle area in East Aifat District, Maybrat. TNI forces engaged in a firefight with Fatem and his men, and Fatem was killed by hostile TNI fire. His two men, Yesias Fatem (commander of 'Mosata Battalion') and Antonius Assem (commander of 'Ayosami Battalion') attempted to flee by crossing the Kamundan River, but were killed by TNI fire during the river crossing. After the attack, TNI forces retrieved an AK-101 rifle and ammunition. According to TNI sources, the fact that Fatem was discovered by the TNI while only having two men under his command was the result of a significant fracture within his unit which led to him being abandoned by most of his subordinates.

=== Badai Kasuari 3.12 ===
On 16–17 October, TNI forces under the command of Lieutenant Colonel Laili Nugroho, under the codename Operation Badai Kasuari 3.12, swept jungle areas in Maybrat. During a sweep of the Ayata area on 16 October, the TNI recovered a Caracal rifle, and the next day recovered a Daewoo K3 light machine gun in the Kamundan River area. Both of these were seized by Fatem's unit from the TNI soldiers killed on March 2026. Aside from these weapons, the TNI also successfully seized a homemade gun and ammunition.

=== Badai Kasuari 3.13 ===
On 29 October 2026, TNI forces the codename Operation Badai Kasuari 3.13 ambushed a TPNPB group at Far East Aifat District, Maybrat. The ambush successfully captured Matius Aisasior, commander of the 'Aikum Battalion' of the TPBPB, his deputy, and another member, without meaningful resistance. It was stated that Aisasior and his battalion were part of Danny Mos' (previous commander of Kodap IV) faction, not Fatem's.

== Aftermath ==
The TNI offensive successfully destroyed virtually all of the TPNPB's organised strength in Maybrat Regency, as well as eliminating the 4th Regional Defence Commando. The surgical strikes conducted by the TNI on TPNPB battalion commanders successfully destroyed the strength of four TPNPB battalions.
