= Attack on Soanggama =

2025 Indonesian military operation in West Papua

- Part of the Papua conflict
Date	15 October 2025
Location	Soanggama, Intan Jaya, Central Papua 3°45′19″S 137°6′52″E
Result	Indonesian victory

Belligerents
Indonesia; TNI-AD	TPNPB

Commanders and leaders
Lucky Avianto	Undius Kogoya #

Casualties and losses
None	3, 6, or 14 killed (Note: Claims by the TPNPB, the local government, and the Indonesian Army, respectively. Excludes two TPNPB members who died during the ensuing manhunt.)
- 9 or 12 civilians killed (Note: Claims by the local government and the TPNPB, respectively.)

The attack on Soanggama took place on 15 October 2025 by units of the Indonesian Army (TNI-AD) against a base of a regional West Papua National Liberation Army (TPNPB) unit based in the village. The TNI-AD unit successfully dislodged TPNPB from its base there, inflicting some casualties on TPNPB and killing 15 people. According to both the TPNPB and the local government of Intan Jaya, the majority of those killed were civilians.

== Background ==
Starting in 2020, Intan Jaya Regency in Central Papua province had been one of the most violent regions in Western Papua as part of the Papua conflict, with around 100 incidents of armed violence in 2020–2023. The West Papua National Liberation Army group active in the regency was Kodap (short for Komando Daerah Pertahanan, Regional Defense Command) VIII, under the command of Undius Kogoya, which also operated in neighboring Paniai. Following a series of skirmishes in 2024, Kogoya and his unit were dislodged from their Paniai base and moved to Intan Jaya.

In early 2024, the Indonesian National Armed Forces formed the Habema Operational Command (Koops Habema) to handle military operations against TPNPB in Papua's highlands. At the time of the attack, Koops Habema was under the command of Major General Lucky Avianto, who was also commander of the South Papua Military Regional Command (Kodam XXIV/Mandala Trikora).

== Attack ==
On 14 October 2025, a detachment of Koops Habema moved towards the Kodap VIII base at the village of Soanggama in Intan Jaya, which TNI-AD claimed was occupied by 30 TPNPB fighters. The detachment consisted of elements from the 500th and the 712th Infantry Battalions. A firefight started at around 5:30 AM on 15 October, which TNI-AD claimed was started by TPNPB fighters. The firefight reportedly concluded by around 12:00 local time as TPNPB fighters withdrew into the surrounding jungle. TNI-AD soldiers captured one firearm and some ammunition along with other TPNPB equipment.

After TPNPB withdrew, TNI-AD units established a new tactical post at Soanggama.

== Aftermath ==
The following day, TPNPB spokesperson Sebby Sambom acknowledged TNI-AD's capture of the village, but claimed that only three TPNPB members were killed, while 12 civilians were killed including eight civilians in a single house. A TNI-AD spokesperson claimed that the attack killed 14 TPNPB members, naming two Kodap officers and one TPNPB member long wanted for attacks on TNI-AD units. A conflict mediation team of the local government of Intan Jaya later reported that six TPNPB members and nine civilians were killed in the attack, including one civilian who had the same name as a Kodap officer. According to both TNI-AD and TPNPB, two more TPNPB members of the unit died shortly after the attack during their pursuit due to non-combat causes, including Undius Kogoya who died of illness on 22 October.

A large number of Soanggama's residents were displaced by the fighting. On 28 October, thousands of Intan Jaya residents held a protest in front of the regent's office of Intan Jaya, demanding an investigation into the killing of civilians at Soanggama and for president Prabowo Subianto to withdraw non-Papuan soldiers from Intan Jaya. The protesters referred to the attack as the "Bloody Soanggama incident" (Indonesian: Peristiwa Soanggama Berdarah). A group of Intan Jaya students filed a gross violation of human rights report to the National Commission on Human Rights' Papua office in Jayapura on 30 October related to the incident. The Papuan People's Assembly called for talks and an investigation into the civilian deaths in Soanggama.
