= Yahukimo massacre (2025) =

Massacre in Indonesia

- Part of Papua conflict
- Yahukimo Regency within Highland Papua
- Location: Yahukimo Regency, Highland Papua, Indonesia
- Date: 6–7 April 2025
- Target: Gold miners
- Attack type: Attack on migrant workers
- Weapons: Firearms, bows and arrows
- Deaths: 15 civilians
- Perpetrator: West Papua Liberation Organization

The Yahukimo massacre occurred from 6 through 7 April 2025 in multiple regions along the Silet River, Yahukimo Regency, Highland Papua province. The attack, carried out by elements of the West Papua National Liberation Army (TPNPB), killed 15 civilian gold miners.

== Background ==
In 1963, Indonesia had annexed West Papua (also known as West Irian), triggering a decades-long separatist conflict in the region. A prominent issue in the conflict was the influx of non-ethnic Papuan migrants from other regions in Indonesia into the island, particularly through the government-sponsored transmigration program, which by the year 2000 had moved 306,447 individuals, largely from Java, into West Papua, thereby displacing the native population. However, since 2013, the Papuan provincial government has suspended the transmigration programme until the population of native Papuans exceeded 20 million (compared to the estimated native Papuan population of approximately 2.7 million in 2010), practically stopping the programme in the short-term future. However, individual migration from outside Papua still happens, with 1.72% of Yahukimo Regency being non-native Papuan, with a significant portion of non-Papuan migrants working as gold panners in the region's gold-rich rivers.

Migrants and migrant workers from outside of Papua became one of the main targets of the West Papua National Liberation Army (TPNPB, the armed wing of the West Papua Liberation Organization, albeit its multitude of self-styled battalions and factions operate independently of each other), with murders of individual migrant workers being a relatively common occurrence in the region. Over the years, there have been several significant flare-ups targeting migrant populations such as the 2017 Mimika blockade and the 2018 Nduga massacre targeting non-ethnic Papuan residents or migrant workers.

== Attack ==
Over two days on 6 and 7 April 2025, TPNPB militants in the Regional Command (Kodap) III Ndugama and Kodap XVI Yahukimo attacked multiple sites along the Silet River in Yahukimo Regency, targeting gold panners from a non-native Papuan background. The victims were attacked using bows and arrows and firearms. At first, the Indonesian security apparatus reported nine deaths, then twelve deaths (by 14 April), then a final count of fifteen deaths (by 15 April). All of the victims are non-native ethnic Papuans, with the following places of residence:

Province	Number
Highland Papua	4
North Sulawesi	3
South Sulawesi	3
Southeast Sulawesi	2
South Papua	1
Maluku	1
Central Java	1

The evacuation of the bodies of the murdered workers were hampered by the fact that the area of the massacre were, for a few days, controlled by TPNPB militants. By 15 April, all of the bodies of the victims have been evacuated and identified by Indonesian authorities. Owing to public health risks, the bodies of the victims were buried locally in Dekai, the capital of the regency, instead of being repatriated to their families. Two other migrant workers, initially suspected of being kidnapped and held hostage by TPNPB militants, were found alive on 14 April after hiding in the jungle for eight days.

== Aftermath ==
The TPNPB, through its spokesperson Sebby Sambom, claimed that the victims of the massacre were undercover TNI personnel. This accusation was refuted by the TNI through its spokesperson Kristomei Sianturi. In the aftermath of the attack, 125 migrant gold panners fled the region towards the neighbouring Asmat Regency, South Papua, to escape the TPNPB.

As a result of the attack, the Indonesian House of Representatives summoned the Indonesian National Armed Forces (TNI) regarding the incident.
