= 2024 Intan Jaya skirmishes =

- Part of the Papua conflict
- Intan Jaya Regency in Central Papua, Indonesia
| Date | 19–23 January 2024 (4 days) |
| Location | Intan Jaya, Central Papua |
| Result | Indonesian victory |

Combatants
| Indonesia | (Free Papua Movement) West Papua National Liberation Army |

Units involved
| Operation Cartenz's Peace; TNI; POLRI | 8th Regional Defence Commando |

Casualties and losses
| 1 killed | 4–5 killed 2 wounded |
- 1 civilian killed 500 civilians internally displaced

The 2024 Intan Jaya skirmishes were fought between the Indonesian army and police periodically in various locations in Intan Jaya Regency, Central Papua from 19 January through 23 January 2024.

== Background ==
According to the Regional Police of Papua, Intan Jaya is one of 7 regencies that are vulnerable to separatist attacks. The West Papua National Liberation Army (TPNPB) in Intan Jaya is organised under the 8th Regional Defence Commando (Kodap VIII Intan Jaya), under the command of Brigadier General Undius Kogoya and his deputy Apen (or Apeni) Kobogau. The Indonesian armed forces and police are jointly organised under Operation Cartenz's Peace.

== Timeline ==
=== January 19 ===
TPNPB militants under the command of Apen Kobogau attacked Indonesian security forces in Bilogai, Wandoga, and Yokatapa villages, Sugapa District, Intan Jaya. In the engagement, TPNPB militants shot and killed Second Police Brigadier Alfandi Karamoy.

=== January 20 ===
TPNPB militants continued to engage Indonesian security forces in various villages in Sugapa District. TPNPB militants entered Mamba Village, attacked the TNI post, and burned the residence of a member of the Intan Jaya Regional Representative Council (DPRD). As a result of the fighting, one civilian, Apriana Sani, was wounded by a stray bullet in Yokatapa Village.

=== January 21: Killing of Yusak Sondegau ===
On 21 January, Yusak Sondegau was shot and killed in Yokatapa Village, Sugapa District. There were conflicting accounts on the identity of Sondegau and how he was killed.

Civilian witnesses on the ground testified that Sondegau was killed after attending church in his own front yard by the TNI after TNI soldiers searched his family's home. His body was evacuated to the local community health centre (puskesmas) by locals and church officials. Local witnesses and Sondegau's family knew him as a farmer who also worked as a government worker in Buwisiga Village, Homeyo District. This assertion was backed by TPNPB spokesman Sebby Sambom, who further claimed that the TNI burned several houses in the area.

Indonesian security forces' accounts on the chronology and Sondegau's identity differed. Chief spokesperson for Operation Cartenz's Peace, Police Adjunct Chief Commissioner Dr. Bayu Suseno, confirmed that Yusak Sondegau was a civilian, but asserted that he was killed by the TPNPB. However, the TNI (Kodam XVII/Cenderawasih) asserted that Yusak Sondegau was a TPNPB militant who, along with six other militants, were carrying firearms on the road from Baitapa Village to Kumbalagupa Village, Sugapa District. The TNI asserted that Sondegau was shot and killed during a firefight with security forces. The TNI further stated that Sondegau's body was evacuated to the local puskesmas by the security forces. However, a photo that circulated in the media of Sondegau's body being carried to the puskesmas by locals and church officials (instead of Indonesian security forces) casts doubt to the veracity of the TNI's claims.

=== January 21 ===
On 21 January (other sources say 22 January) TPNPB militants under the command of "field commander" Yoswa Maisani (part of the Guspi Waker group) attacked the TNI post belonging to Infantry Battalion 330/TD in Sugapa District. In this attack, no TNI casualties were recorded, while TPNPB militants Jaringan Belau, Oni Kobogau, and Agustia were shot by security officers. Indonesian security forces gave conflicting accounts: one statement claimed that all three were killed, while another statement said that either Oni Kobogau and Jaringan Belau were wounded (and Agustia killed), or only Jaringan Belau was wounded (and Agustia and Oni Kobogau killed).

=== January 22 ===
TPNPB militants burned four civilian houses in Bilogai Village, Sugapa District. No casualties were recorded.

=== January 23 ===
TPNPB's Wabu Battalion under the command of Yoswa Maisani attacked a TNI post in Sugapa District. The attack was repelled by Indonesian security forces, with the ensuing engagement killing TPNPB militants Melkias Matani and Harisatu Nambagani.

== Impact ==
Due to the fighting, 500 civilians from six villages were internally displaced and became refugees. All flights to the remote area, including fuel delivery flights, were temporarily suspended.
