= Operation Sadar =

1965-1967 Indonesian Military Operations In Papua

- Part of Papua conflict
Date	10–25 August 1965
Location	Manokwari and Sorong
Result	Indonesian government victory
Territorial changes	Expulsion of OPM on Sorong and Manokwari

Belligerents
Indonesia	(Republic of West Papua) Free Papua Movement

Commanders and leaders
(Indonesia) Brig. Gen R.Kartidjo	Unknown

Strength
Hundred troops Supported by several aircraft	Thousands

Casualties and losses
Several Injured	36 killed Many villages burned

Operation Sadar (lit. 'Conscious'; Indonesian: Operasi Sadar) was a military campaign conducted by the Indonesian National Armed Forces (TNI) in Papua, targeting villages suspected of supporting the Free Papua Movement. The operation was also a direct response to the 1965 Arfai incident, which had heightened tensions in the region. During the campaign, TNI forces attacked these villages, destroying several communities and displacing much of the local population.

== Background ==
In 1965, Indonesian forces in Manokwari were engaged in a skirmish during the 1965 Arfai Incident outpost. Despite the intensity of the attack, the Indonesian military repelled the rebel attacks, effecting their commander, Ferry Awom's, surrender.

In response to this attack, the Indonesian military launched "Operation Sadar," a campaign to crush the OPM guerrilla movement in the Manokwari and Sorong regions. The operation combined intelligence and territorial operations to provide strategic support for the combat missions conducted across Papua. These efforts included targeted military actions and broader measures to weaken the OPM's influence, marking a critical escalation in the government's efforts to maintain control over the region.

== Operations ==
On August 10, Indonesian forces attacked Manokwari, targeting villages suspected of supporting the OPM rebellion. Entire villages were set ablaze including several OPM headquarters, displacing many civilians. There were aerial attacks against church buildings in the area, resulting in damaged infrastructure and significant civilian casualties.

On August 20, Indonesian forces launched an offensive in Sorong, targeting OPM companies that were planning to raid an Indonesian military outpost in Sorong. During the engagement, the Indonesian military conducted aerial strikes to disrupt and neutralize the OPM forces. The operation was deemed a success, resulting in the death of 36 OPM fighters, while the remaining rebels were forced to retreat, many of them suffering severe injuries. The attack further weakened the OPM's presence in the region, consolidating the Indonesian military’s control over Sorong.

Following the major attacks in Sorong, the Indonesian military gathered intelligence about the OPM's plans, strategies, and organizational structure to preempt future attacks by uncovering rebel networks and disrupting their operations.

In the following days, there were operations to capture OPM-controlled areas, to liberate villages and strategic locations from OPM control, and solidify the Indonesian government's presence. The intelligence and military activities decreased the OPM's presence.

== Aftermath ==
These operations targeted numerous OPM headquarters and included extensive aerial strikes to expel OPM forces. Alongside these attacks, the operations gathered vital intelligence on OPM's planned assaults and strategies, disrupting their activities. Additionally, the Indonesian military reclaimed much territory held by the OPM.

This phase of the campaign transitioned into Operation Bharatayudha, a more aggressive and large-scale military offensive. The new operation aimed to attack OPM strongholds and eliminate the rebels in Papua. This marked a decisive shift in strategy, with the Indonesian forces striving to crush the OPM's resistance.

== Citations ==
- John (2019-11-04). "The Past That Has Not Passed: Human Rights Violations in Papua Before and After Reformasi" (PDF). ELSHAM. International Center for Transitional Justice.
- Jopari, John (1995). Pemberontakan Organisasi Papua Merdeka (in Indonesian). Jakarta: Grasindo. ISBN 978-979-553-227-9.
- Amiruddin, Al Rahab (2017-10-07). "Operasi-Operasi Militer Di Papua:Pagar Makan Tanaman?". Kemdikbud.
