= Nduga massacre =

Mass killing in West Papua

- Part of the Papua conflict
- Location: Nduga, Papua, Indonesia (now Highland Papua)
- Date: December 1, 2018
- Deaths: 20: 19 civilians 1 soldier
- Perpetrator: West Papua National Liberation Army

The Nduga massacre (Indonesian: Pembantaian Nduga) was a shooting of construction workers that occurred on 1 December 2018, in Nduga Regency, Papua (now in Highland Papua), Indonesia. The shooting is considered to be part of the Papuan conflict. The West Papua National Liberation Army (TPNPB) acknowledged responsibility and the Indonesian government labeled the attack a massacre.

== Background ==
Papua province, the location of the massacre, has seen low-level insurgency since its incorporation into Indonesia. While the rest of the former Dutch East Indies were recognised in 1949 as part of the new country of Indonesia, the Dutch held onto Western New Guinea until handing it to Indonesian administration in 1963. It was incorporated as a province of Indonesian through the contentious Act of Free Choice in 1969. Activists who objected to incorporation into Indonesia independence groups including the West Papua Liberation Organization, the OPM and the TPNPB. The conflict is further fueled by economic disadvantage and poverty of Native Papuans, immigration of other ethnic groups (Transmigration program) and human rights violations by Indonesian forces.

Following his election in 2014, Indonesian president, Joko Widodo, embarked on reforms intended to alleviate grievances of Native Papuans. These include ending the transmigration program and starting infrastructure spending in Papua, including building Trans Papua roads network. The Indonesian military says there has been local opposition to the road project since the commencement of construction and by February 2018 the government's response to letters asking that the construction be stopped, has been to deploy additional troops for sweeping operations. The bridge where the attack occurred is a part of the planned network.

== Attack and massacre ==
Workers from Istaka Karya, an Indonesian construction company were constructing a bridge over Yigi river (Indonesian: Kali Yigi) in Yigi district, Nduga Regency. They took work leave at 1 December, as the day has usually been considered unsafe to work, due to activities of Papuan separatists celebrating the declaration of Papuan independence of Free Papua Movement on that day. One of the workers allegedly took photos of one such celebration in nearby field, which angered the armed group and triggered the attack.

At the evening, the armed Papuan separatist group attacked the workers' camp and took 25 workers as hostages. The following day (2 December 2018), the armed group took the workers to a nearby hill and proceeded to shoot the workers. 19 workers were confirmed dead, 2 workers were missing (as of 5 December 2018) and 4 workers managed to escape by pretending to be dead. The survivors managed to flee to a nearby Indonesian Army post, where further shooting killed one soldier.

Indonesian authorities claimed that the armed group responsible for the murders numbered around 40 people and was led by Egianus Kogoya. During the evacuation process, the Indonesian National Armed Forces alleged that the rebel soldiers attacked their evacuation helicopters. In return, the armed group alleged that the Indonesian military used bombs and explosives during the evacuation process, which the military denied, but they did acknowledge the use of grenade launchers on infantry assault rifles.

== Responses ==
The TPNPB claimed responsibility of the attack, stating that the victims were not civilian workers, but in fact "armed members of Indonesia's military ... disguised as civilians". Jacob Rumbiak, spokesman for the United Liberation Movement for West Papua (ULMWP), justified the murders as "self defense against Indonesian occupation".

Joko Widodo, President of Indonesia, ordered for the arrest of the perpetrators and for the road construction to continue. Minister of Defense Ryamizard Ryacudu stated that there will be no negotiations and the armed group should "surrender or be finished off".

== Aftermath ==
Indonesian president Joko Widodo condemned the attack and promised a quick response, and the Papuan provincial administration described it as a "human rights violation". Indonesian authorities began an investigation of the murders and deployed armed personnel to the region. In an open letter addressed to Widodo and read in a YouTube video, a rebel spokesperson from the Free Papua Movement stated their demand that another referendum be held for native Papuans, and added that they would not surrender to the Indonesian government. The Trans-Papua Highway project was also suspended temporarily due to security concerns in the area.

The Indonesian National Armed Forces indicated that they would not be initiating a formal military operation in the region, although a spokesman of Kodam XVII/Cenderawasih remarked that a "normal" joint operation with the Indonesian National Police would be sufficient. According to Moeldoko, Chief of the Presidential Staff Office, 154 soldiers and policemen were sent to the area to aid in the investigation.

On 20 December 2018, following operations by the Indonesian military, four civilians were found dead. Local authorities claimed that the civilians had been trapped in firefights between the army and the armed groups. According to volunteers grouped under the Nduga Solidarity Civil Society Coalition, tens of thousands of civilians were displaced by the fighting - with figures ranging from 39,000 to 52,000 - and reportedly, 182 had died in the refugee camps due to poor healthcare and access to basic supplies. The refugee death toll was disputed by the government, who gave a number of 53.
