= Trans-Papua Highway =

Major road in Indonesia

- Jalan Raya Trans-Papua

Route information
- Length: 4,325 km (2,687 mi)

Major junctions
- South end: Merauke, South Papua
- To: Sorong, Southwest Papua

Location
- Country: Indonesia
- Provinces: Central Papua; Highland Papua; Papua; South Papua; Southwest Papua; West Papua
- Major cities: Manokwari; Nabire; Tanahmerah; Bintuni; Wamena; etc

Highway system
- Transport in Indonesia

The Trans-Papua Highway (Indonesian: Jalan Raya Trans-Papua) refers to 12 road segments, some under construction, across Western New Guinea in Indonesia, located in the island of New Guinea. The roads stretch from Sorong to Merauke with a total length of 4,325 km (2,687 mi). As of March 2017, 3,850 km (2,390 mi) of roads had been completed and construction on all the roads was predicted to finish in 2018, but construction was delayed in late 2018 due to armed conflict.

As of 2019, around 90% of the route had been cleared, although very little was paved and bridges had not been constructed.

The completed road segments include 884 out of Indonesia's 1,068 km border road with Papua New Guinea. As of May 2017, the remaining parts of the road, including 7,000 meters of bridges, were planned to be completed in 2017 and 2018, although not all of the road has been layered by asphalt. As of October 2020, the road was only 200–300 km from completion.

== Road segments ==
=== In West Papua and Southwest Papua ===
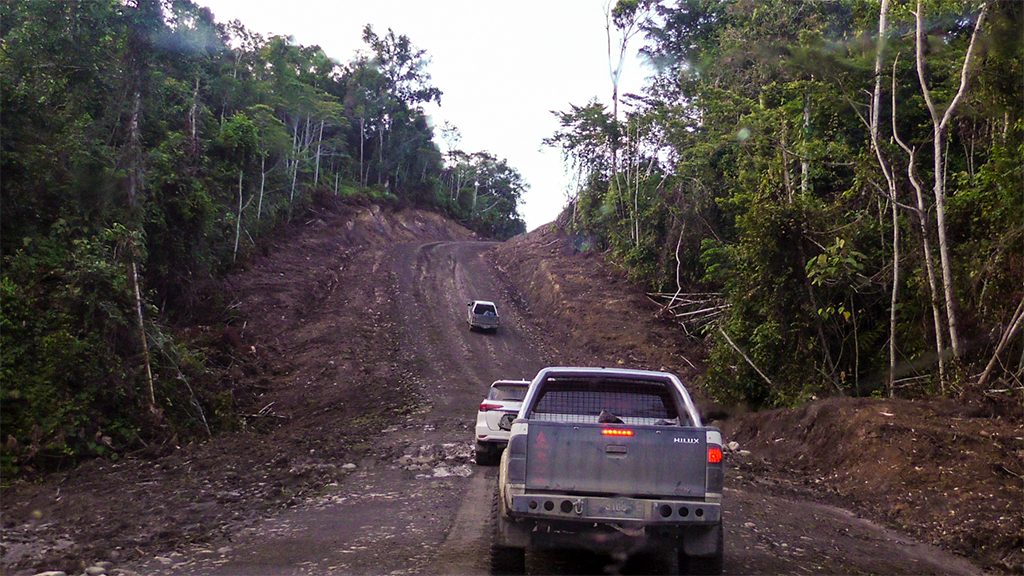
Unpaved Sorong-Maybrat-Manokwari segment of Trans-Papua Highway in 2018

There are 4 road segments in Southwest Papua and West Papua:

- Sorong-Manokwari
- Manokwari-Bintuni-Aroba-Teluk Arguni
- Fakfak-Hurimber-Bomberay
- Sorong-Mega Moraid

=== In Papua, Central Papua, Highland Papua, and South Papua ===
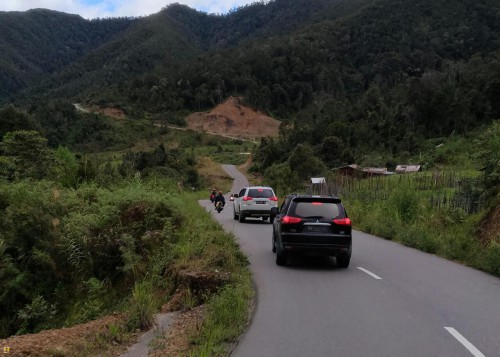
Paved section of Trans-Papua Highway connecting Deiyai and Mimika

There are 8 road segments in Papua with a total length of 2,345.40 km (1,457.36 mi); of which by the end of October 2019, only 31.96 km is not yet connected. 874,45 km of the connected segments is layered with asphalt, and 1.465,46 km yet to be layered with asphalt.

- Segment I: Kwatisore-Nabire, 208.10 kilometers (Central Papua)
- Segment II: Nabire-Wagete-Enarotali, 275.50 kilometers (Central Papua)
- Segment III: Enarotali-Ilaga-Mulia-Wamena, 469.48 kilometers (Central Papua-Highland Papua)
- Segment IV: Wamena-Elelim-Jayapura, 447.22 kilometers (Highland Papua-Papua)
- Segment V: Wamena-Habema-Kenyam-Mumugu, 271.60 kilometers (Highland Papua-South Papua)
- Segment VI: Kenyam-Dekai, 217.90 kilometers (Highland Papua)
- Segment VII: Dekai-Oksibil, 231.60 kilometers (Highland Papua)
- Segment VIII: Wagete-Timika, 224.00 kilometers (Central Papua)

== Impact ==
Connections of the road opened access to many isolated areas in Papua region, which has not been possible previously. According to Mongabay, while the road brings benefit to native Papuans in terms of availability of goods and access to healthcare facilities, the road also has potentially harmful consequences such as opening way for illegal logging, intensifying contacts between several tribes that could lead to tribal conflicts, and leaving previously isolated towns and villages economically dominated by those from bigger cities. Analyst of public policies, Agus Pambagio argued that the construction should be advised by anthropologist to take cultural factors into account. The road is also feared to damage Lorentz National Park, which is a protected natural area. Papuan governor Lukas Enembe criticized the road construction, saying that the road "mostly has not been used" by native Papuans. Armed wing of Free Papua Movement rejected the road construction, saying that it is "used for military purposes".

== Incident ==
During the construction of the highway at least 20 construction workers in Nduga were killed by soldiers of the West Papua National Liberation Army (TPNPB), who claimed the highway was meant for military enforcement rather than economic benefit, and was built by military members disguised as civilian workers. As of December 2018, the project is suspended temporarily due to security concerns. In late January 2019, about two months after the attack, project managers said construction would resume using combat engineers from the Indonesian military. About a month later in March, the TPNPB soldiers returned and killed three Indonesian soldiers.
