= Operation Cartenz's Peace =

2018 Indonesian anti-separatist operation

Operation Cartenzs' Peace
- Part of Papua conflict
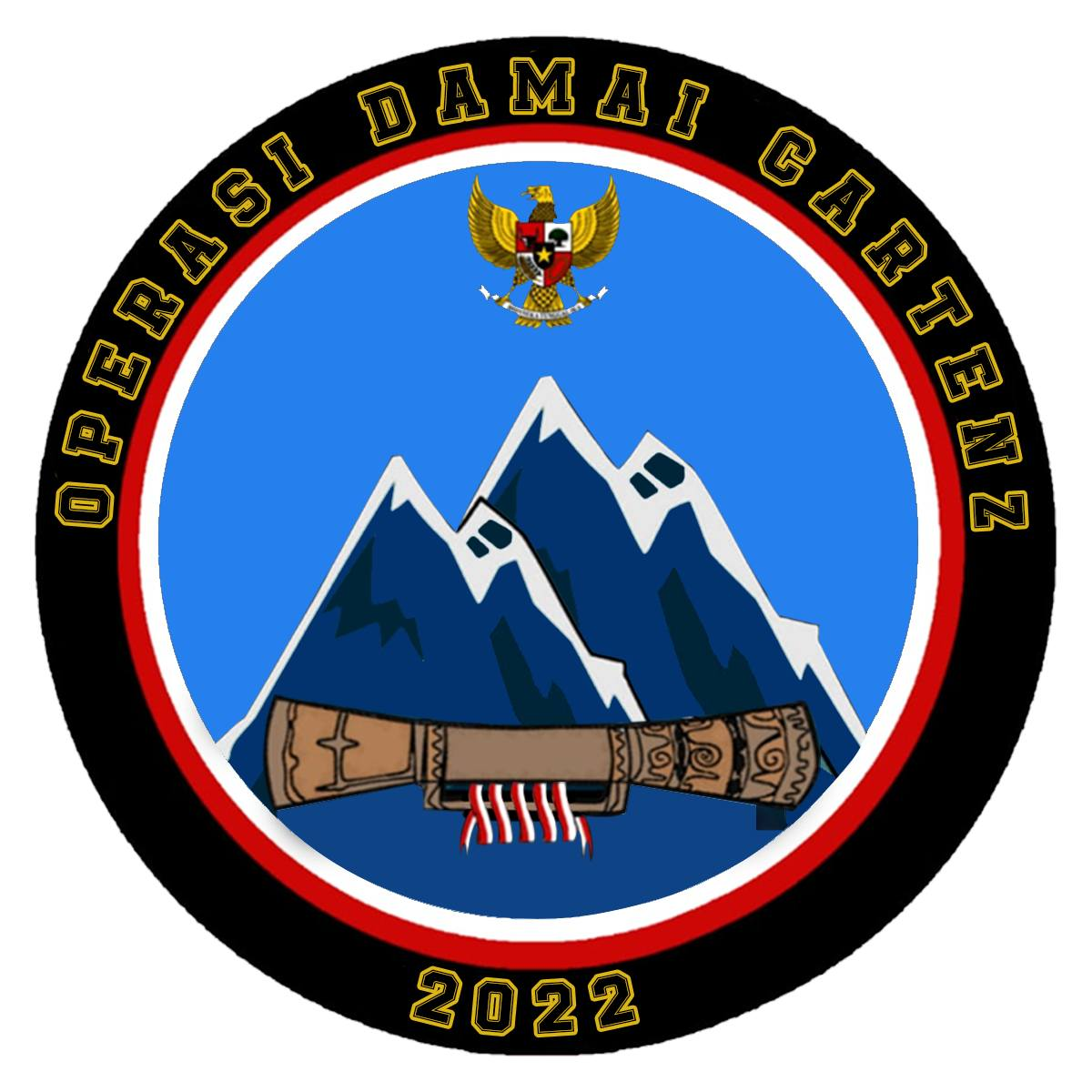
Date	5 January 2018 – present (8 years, 7 months, 3 weeks and 6 days)
Location	Highlands of Papua
Status	Ongoing: Death of Hengky Wamang, commander from Mimika region under Joni Botak Beanal.; Conflict intensified in Intan Jaya Regency.; Death of Elly M. Bidana, operation commander from Ngalum Kupel faction under Lamek Taplo active in Pegunungan Bintang.; Capture and subsequent death of Demius Magayang, operation commander from Yahukimo Regency.

Belligerents
Indonesia	Free Papua Movement

Commanders and leaders
(Indonesia) Joko Widodo (2018–2024) (Indonesia) Prabowo Subianto (Indonesia) Ryamizard Ryacudu (Indonesia) Tito Karnavian (Indonesia) Idham Azis (Indonesia) Listyo Sigit Prabowo (Indonesia) Hadi Tjahjanto (Indonesia) Andika Perkasa (Indonesia) Yudo Margono (Indonesia) Agus Subiyanto (Indonesia) Paulus Waterpauw (Indonesia) Mathius Fakhiri (Indonesia) Petrus Patrige Rudolf Renwarin (Indonesia) Tornagogo Sihombing (Indonesia) Daniel Tahi Monang Silitonga (Indonesia) Jhonny Edison Isir	(Free Papua Movement) Benny Wenda (in-exile) (Free Papua Movement) Goliath Tabuni (presumed retired from active command) (Free Papua Movement) Lekagak Telenggen (Free Papua Movement) Joni Botak Beanal † (killed by Lewis Kogoya of Intan Jaya faction) (Free Papua Movement) Egianus Kogoya (Free Papua Movement) Sabinus Waker (defected to WPA) (Free Papua Movement) Undius Kogoya # (Free Papua Movement) Militer Murib and Penny Murib (Free Papua Movement) Lamek Taplo † (Free Papua Movement) Deny Moos (Free Papua Movement) Jepchon Gepjae

Units involved
Indonesian National Armed Forces; Indonesian Army; Kodam XVIII/Kasuari; Kodam XVII/Cendrawasih; Independent Army units (rotating); Indonesian Navy; Indonesian Marine Corps; Indonesian Air Force; Kopasgat; Indonesian National Police; Mobile Brigade Corps; Southwest Papua Regional Police; West Papua Regional Police; Central Papua Regional Police; Papua Regional Police	(Free Papua Movement) TPNPB-OPM: Ilaga faction (formerly Yambi) under Lekagak Telenggen; Sinak faction (formerly Gome) under Militer Murib, split from group under Lekagak Telenggen; Ndugama faction under Egianus Kogoya; Intan Jaya faction (formerly Tembagapura), formerly under Sabinus Waker, but defected to WPA. Currently led by Undius Kogoya; Kalikopi faction under Joni Botak Beanal; Ngalum Kupel faction under Lamek Alipky Taplo; Sorong Raya faction under Deny Moos; Merauke faction under Jepchon Gepjae

Casualties and losses
70 soldiers and 29 policemen killed (2019–2025)	Cartenz's Peace task force source: 272 killed (2021 – 2025) 1,384 captured (until 2025)
- 331 civilians killed (2019 – 2025)

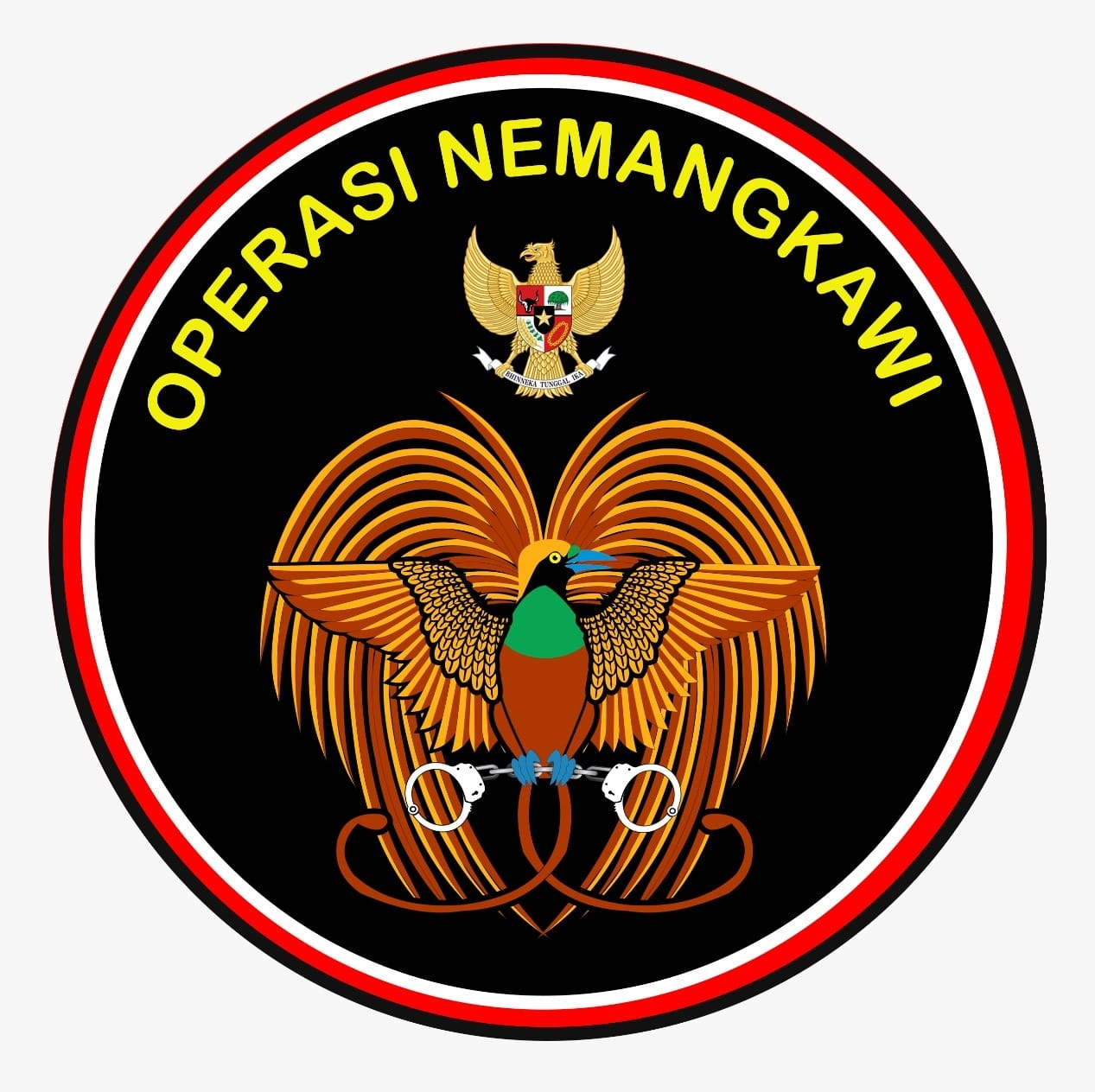
Previous official patch as Operation Nemangkawi

Operation Cartenz's Peace (Indonesian: Operasi Damai Cartenz), formerly Operation Nemangkawi, is a joint-operation conducted by Indonesian National Armed Forces and Indonesian National Police to curb armed separatist rebels in Papua. According to Chief of Papua Regional Police, Mathius Fakhiri, there are currently six active separatist groups located mainly in Papua highlands. While there are two groups which became less active or retired after Operation Nemangkawi. Tingginambut faction under Goliath Tabuni were beaten in October 2018, and 10 members were subdued by Police. Goliath Tabuni moved to Gome District and presumed retired. Lanny Jaya faction under Purom Wenda became less active after Police operation in Balingga District and its headquarters in Kali Mau. Some members of this group left and "return" to Indonesia.
