= Arfai incident =

1965 skirmish between Indonesian Army soldiers and Free Papua Movement fighters

Arfai Incident
- Part of the Papua conflict
Date	28 July 1965
Location	Manokwari, Irian Jaya
Result	Indonesian victory

Belligerents
Indonesia	(Republic of West Papua) Free Papua Movement; Cassowary Battalion

Commanders and leaders
(Indonesia) Sarwo Edhie Wibowo	(Republic of West Papua) Ferry Awom (surrendered) (Note: In the Operation Pamungkas Ferry Awom and his battalions were surrendered on Borasi field.)

Strength
1 battalion	c. 400

Casualties and losses
3–18 killed	4–36 killed

The Arfai incident (Indonesian: Peristiwa Arfai) was a skirmish between Indonesian Army soldiers and Free Papua Movement fighters backed by local sympathizers on 28 July 1965, where the fighters launched a raid against an Indonesian barracks in an attempt to capture firearms.

== Events ==
On 26 July, three Indonesian Army soldiers were shot during a flag-raising ceremony, and the following day, the army launched reprisals, with soldiers reportedly roaming the streets firing at civilians.

The raid occurred against the barracks of army's 641st infantry battalion in Arfai, Manokwari on 28 July 1965, and was conducted by an armed group under one Permanas Ferry Awom, which numbered around 400 men and originated mainly from Biak tribe, from Biak, Numfor, Ayamaru and Serui. Awom was a member of the Papuan Volunteer Corps, and according to a participant in the raid during a later interview, he entered Manokwari with around 80 fighters, receiving help from local sympathizers. Later lieutenant general Sintong Panjaitan, who arrived in Irian in 1967, wrote in his memoir that the attack occurred on 4:30 AM, and the Papuan fighters utilized firearms, parang, spears and bows. Meanwhile forces of Lodewijk Mandacan and Barents Mandacan would be mostly from Arfak tribe, some former members of Papuan Volunteer Corps.

Reportedly, 3 Indonesian soldiers were killed in the raid and another 4 were injured, while Panjaitan wrote that 36 rebels were killed. He also wrote that two pieces of small arms - a Bren light machine gun and an automatic weapon - were captured. The International Center for Transitional Justice reported that "18 Indonesian military personnel and four OPM guerrillas" were killed in the incident.

== Aftermath ==
Following the incident, alongside other events in Manokwari and Sorong, the Indonesian National Armed Forces launched a military operation codenamed Sadar under Brig. Gen. R. Kartidjo, which involved pressuring civilians and launching aerial attacks, on occasion burning villages supporting rebellions. After Brig. Gen. Sarwo Edhie Wibowo became commander of Kodam XVII/Cenderawasih he launched operation Wibawa. He tasked Major Heru Sisnodo and Air Sergeant major John Saleky of Kopassus to meet with Lodewijk Mandatjan and Barents Mandatjan and managed to convinced them alongside to surrender. Both of them would later be granted the rank of titular Major. While some of Cassowary Battalions under them would be integrated with Kodam XVII/Cenderawasih after trained in Siliwangi and Diponegoro. Meanwhile Permenas Ferry Awom would surrender to Capt. Sahala Rajaguguk alongside 400 of his men in July 1971.
