= Lucky Avianto =

Indonesian military officer (born 1974)

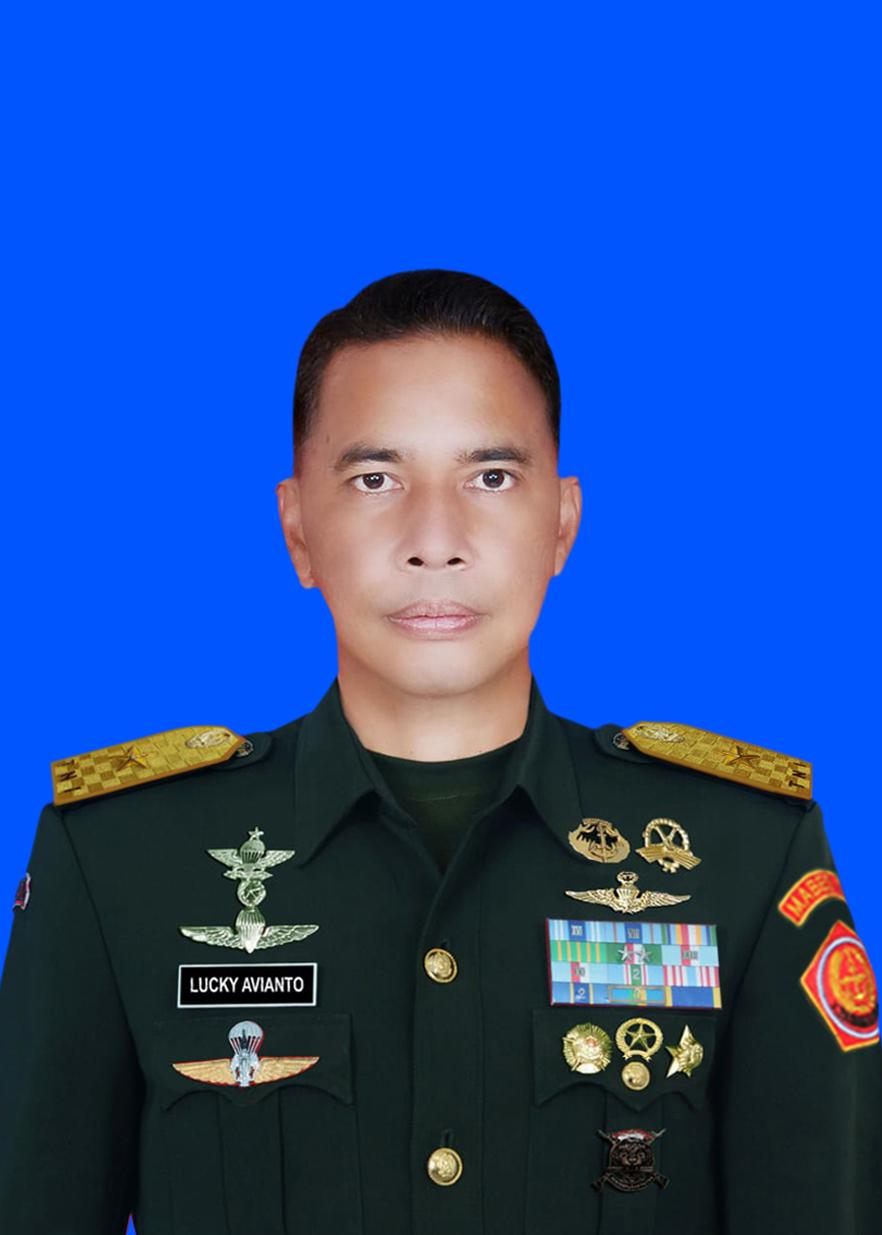
- Born: 2 October 1974 (age 52); Jakarta, Indonesia
- Alma mater: Indonesian Military Academy; General Achmad Yani University (S.IP); Krisnadwipayana University (M.Si)
- Spouse: Dian Pujiwati
- Children: 4
- Military career
- Branch: Indonesian Army
- Service years: 1996–present
- Rank: Lieutenant general
- Service number: 11960045411074
- Unit: Infantry
- Commands: 3rd Defense Territorial Joint Command; Mandala Trikora (South Papua) Regional Military Command; Habema Operations Command; Kopassus Group 1 Bangkalan Military District; 500th Raider Infantry Battalion; 400th Raider Infantry Battalion
- Conflicts: Insurgency in Aceh; Israeli–Lebanese conflict Papua conflict

Lucky Avianto (born 2 October 1974) is an Indonesian army general who is currently the commander of the 3rd Defense Territorial Joint Command, serving in the position since 26 March 2026. Previously, he was the commander of the Mandala Trikora (South Papua) Regional Military Command and was entrusted to lead Operation Habema, a military operation aimed to curb the influence of Papuan separatist movement in the region, since 2024.

== Early life, education, and personal life ==
Lucky was born in Jakarta on 2 October 1974 as the son of H.R. Slamet Iswadi, a lieutenant colonel of the army. Lucky spent most of his childhood at the army residential complex in West Jakarta. His upbringing as a military brat influenced him to join the army. After completing junior high school at the Jakarta 45th State Junior High School, Lucky became the first cohort at the Taruna Nusantara High School, a semi-military boarding school owned by the armed forces, in 1990. He began routinely writing his diary in English and documenting his everyday life during high school.

Lucky commenced his military education at the Indonesian Military Academy in 1993. During his studies, Lucky was selected to participate in a cadet exchange program to Australia due to his proficient English. He then graduated from the military academy in 1996 with the Adhi Makayasa distinction as the best graduate of his class. He was commissioned as a second lieutenant of the infantry corps before undertaking several short-term military courses in infantry, combat intelligence, paratrooping, and English. After completing command education, Lucky entered the army's elite forces, the Kopassus.

Lucky obtained his bachelor's degree in governance sciences from the General Achmad Yani University in 2012 and his master's degree in administrative sciences from the Krisnadwipayana University in 2018. He received the cum laude distinction for both of his degrees.

Lucky is married to Dian Pujiwati and has four daughters.

== Military career ==
=== Early career ===
Lucky started off his military career with assignments to various positions, both technical and command, of the Kopassus forces. Between 2000 and 2003, Lucky was sent to fight insurgents in Aceh as an intelligence officer. He received a promotion to the rank of captain by his second year of service there and was entrusted to lead intelligence officers as the chief of intelligence. Upon his return, Lucky's career gradually rose, serving as company and team commander within Kopassus's Group 2 and Group 3. By 2007, he had already become the chief of operation within Kopassus's group 1. Lucky was frequently sent abroad during the course of his career in Kopassus, such as to Singapore for a basic manpower course and joint exercise and to Brunei for a shooting competition.

From chief of operations, Lucky was promoted to the rank of major and served as the deputy commander of Kopassus 11th infantry battalion in Serang. Under his leadership, the battalion won a troop readiness competition. In 2010, Lucky was sent to the Democratic Republic of the Congo as a military observer under the MONUSCO. After he returned home, he wrote a book on his experience in DR Congo. He was then appointed as the coordinator for personal staffs to Kopassus commanding general.

In 2011, Lucky attended the Indonesian Army Command and General Staff College and graduated with the distinction as the best graduate of his class. As the best graduate, Lucky received the Colin East Award from the Indonesia-Australia Defence Alumni Association and received a fully paid trip to visit military installations in Australia. Around the same time, Lucky also participated in the Dawn Kookaburra joint exercise, which involved Indonesian and Australian soldiers training together in Australia. He documented his experience in a book titled Tour to Aussie. Lucky left Kopassus in May 2012 to take up his posting as the commander of the 400th Raider Infantry Battalion in Semarang.

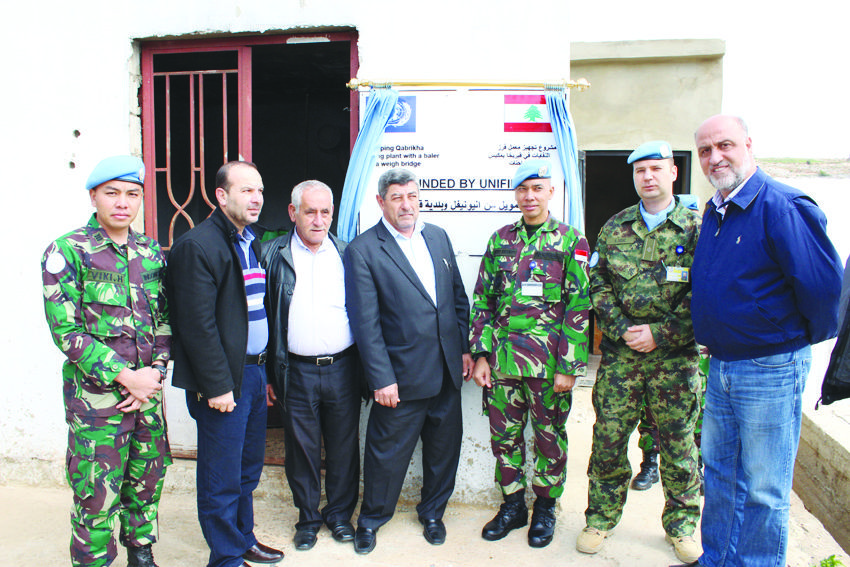
Lucky (third from right) at the inauguration of a new waste processing facility for the Qabrikha municipality, 2013.

During his brief three-month posting in the 400th battalion, Lucky published three separate books on his unit. On 4 October 2012, he officially became the commander of the 500th Raider Infantry Battalion in Surabaya. Lucky's unit was deployed to Lebanon as part of the Indonesia battalion of the United Nations Interim Force in Lebanon. He served for a year in Southern Lebanon and returned to Indonesia in December 2013. He then handed over his duties as battalion commander to Major Mulliadi on 12 June 2014 and was sent to Bangkalan in the Madura Island as military district commander. Lucky was described by the local media as an approachable and knowledgeable military figure, with the online media Madura Corner projecting him as a future army general. He oversaw the 93rd TNI Manunggal Membangun Desa (TMMD) program, an army community service initiative, held in Bangkalan in October 2014 and the military district's role in developing Bangkalan's agriculture sector. He briefly became an adjunct lecturer in the community development class at the Trunojoyo University several days before the end of his duty.

After about half a year of service, on 25 March 2015 Lucky was replaced as military district commander by Lieutenant Colonel Sunardi Istanto, who had completed his tour of duty from South Sumatra. In response to his departure, Bangkalan deputy regent Mondir Rofii expressed his hopes of Lucky returning to East Java either as the commander of the Brawijaya Regional Military Command, covering the entire province, or in Jakarta as the commander-in-chief of the armed forces. Lucky then returned to Kopassus as the deputy operations assistant to the commanding general. He was then promoted to colonel and respectively became the commanding general's planning assistant from 21 July 2016 to 2017 and assistant for operations from 2017 to 2018. On 21 April 2018, Lucky became the commander of the 1st group of Kopassus, headquartered in Serang. He served for a total of one year and three months until his departure on 11 August 2019 to pursue further studies at the joint command and general staff college. At the end of his studies in December 2019, Lucky received the Wira Adi Nugraha award as the best graduate of his class. For his best graduation distinction in the military academy and the two command and general staff colleges, Lucky was nicknamed the "hat-trick general".

=== Later career ===
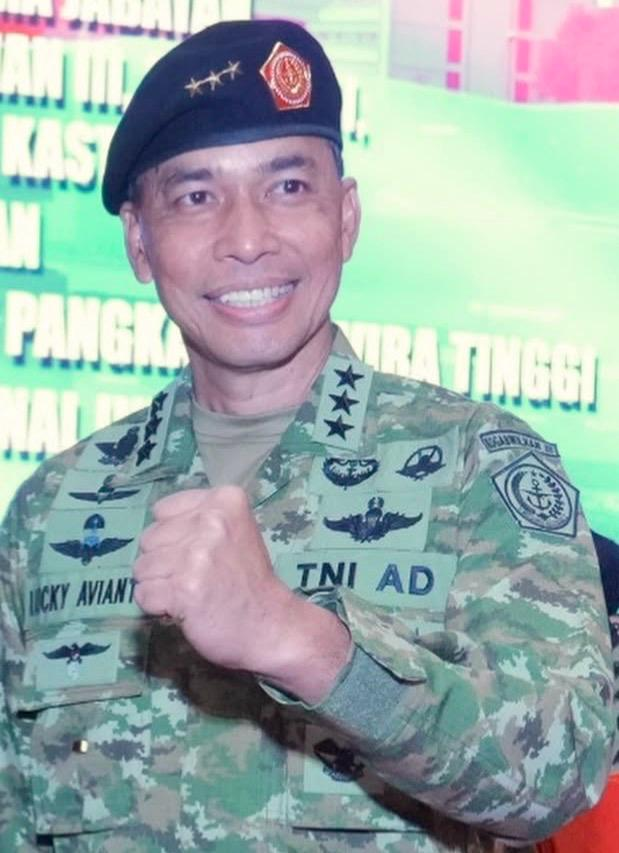
Lucky Avianto in 2026

Lucky's completion of the joint command and general staff college coincided with the start of the COVID-19 pandemic in Indonesia. By 13 April 2020, the government declared the pandemic as a national emergency, with the army taking part in combatting the spread of the virus. Lucky was assigned to the operations center of the government's task force on the COVID-19, during which he mostly slept in the National Agency for Disaster Management's central building. On 8 June 2020, an army chief of staff decree appointed him as the assistant for operations to the Kasuari (West Papua) Regional Military Command, serving under the command of the indigenuous Major General Ali Hamdan Bogra. During his tenure, Lucky conducted a selection process to determine Kasuari's representative for the Joint Readiness Training Center (JRTC) rotation with the U.S. Army. Lucky's tenure as operations assistant ended on 26 October 2021 and was transferred to West Kalimantan as the commander of the province's regional military command training regiment on 2 November that year.

Two months after his appointment, on 21 January 2022 Lucky was appointed by decree as the chief of the state intelligence agency's center for education and training. He handed over his duties as training regiment commander on 16 February and was promoted to the rank of brigadier general in accordance to his new position on 28 February. In April 2023, Lucky was reassigned to the army headquarters to attend a strategic education course at the National Resilience Institute in Jakarta. Lucky completed the course in October that year as the best performing graduate academically from the army. A month later, on 29 November Lucky was appointed as the deputy assistant of operations to the army chief of staff for unit readiness.

In April 2024, commander of the armed forces General Agus Subiyanto launched Operation Habema, an operation aimed to unify the police and armed forces response to quell separatist movement in Papua through smart power. The operation was named after Lake Habema, a lake located at the foot of the Trikora Summit, and was given the backronym of Harus Berhasil Maksimal (Total Success Requirement). Lucky was dual hatted to lead the operations, alongside his duties at the army headquarters. Lucky launched several military operations to liberate districts under the control of the Free Papua Movement (OPM), including retaking the Homeyo district in less than twenty minutes. In October 2025, Lucky initiated a retaliatory operation following a series of killings in previous months. The attack targeted OPM's headquarters in the Soanggama village and resulted in the death of 14 OPM soldiers, including the chief of staff of OPM's Soanggama command.

By the next year, Lucky was promoted as the armed forces commander's senior advisor for international relations, with a decree dated 6 December 2024. He was promoted to major general on 14 January 2025. Several months later, Lucky was appointed as the commander of the newly formed Mandala Trikora Regional Military Command, covering the South Papua province. The new regional military command was established to shorten the chain of command, ensuring a swift action on security issues. Lucky was sworn in alongside five other commanders of inaugural regional commands by president Prabowo Subianto on 10 August and began his duties at the regional military command's HQ in Merauke exactly a month later. He introduced the new regional military command's jargon, SOBAT (Sinergi-Optimis-Berhasil-Akuntabel-Tepat, Synergy-Optimistic-Successful-Accountable-Precise) and API (Attitude-Performance-Intelligence).

On 9 March 2026, Lucky was further promoted to the three-star post of commander of the 3rd Defense Territorial Joint Command. He was accordingly promoted to the rank of lieutenant general and was sworn in for the position on 26 March 2026. He became the commander of the Indonesian armed forces' 81th anniversary ceremony, held on 5 October 2026 at the armed forces headquarters. Former president Susilo Bambang Yudhoyono, who was present at the ceremony, was introduced to Lucky by president Prabowo.

== Dates of rank ==
Second lieutenant	1996
First lieutenant	2000
Captain	2003
Major	2008
Lieutenant colonel	2013
Colonel	2017
Brigadier general	28 February 2022
Major general	14 January 2025
Lieutenant general	26 March 2026
