= Mimika blockade =

- Part of the Papua conflict
Date	November 2017
Location	near Tembagapura, Mimika Regency, Papua
Result	Blockade lifted, civilians evacuated

Belligerents
Indonesia	(Republic of West Papua) Free Papua Movement

Strength
Local personnel 300 additional personnel	135 (TNI data)

Casualties and losses
2 dead	At least 2 dead

In November 2017, tensions developed in Mimika Regency of Papua following a blockade of two villages by the National Liberation Army of West Papua, the military arm of the Free Papua Movement (OPM). The Government of Indonesia described the situation as a "hostage crisis", with the Indonesian Police reporting that 1,300 people were held hostage. Other sources, such as human rights lawyer Veronica Koman, or, later, local authorities, denied the "hostage crisis" claim, as OPM had been primarily establishing roadblocks impeding access to the affected villages.

Prior to the blockade, tensions in the region has flared up, with shooting incidents killing 1 Indonesian police officer and wounding 6 others. Following a breakdown in negotiations, a military operation was held on 17 November, which resulted in the OPM fighters abandoning the villages. AsiaNews reported that two dead OPM members were found. In total, 2 police officers were killed and seven were injured.
