= West Papua Liberation Organization =

The West Papua Liberation Organisation (WPLO; Indonesian: Organisasi Pembebasan Papua Barat; OPPB) is an organisation based in Lusk, Wyoming, United States, promoting the self-determination of West Papuans through separatism from Indonesia.

== History ==
The WPLO was first established by students at the University of Paradise, Youth West Papua at the initiative of John Anari, ST on July 22, 2002 using the name of Youth and Student Association Natives West Papua (West Papuan Indigenous Students and Youth, AWPISY). This was changed in 2008 to WPIO (West Papuan Indigenous Organization) and then again in 2009 to WPLO (West Papua Liberation Organisation).

The WPLO officially declared simultaneously an International Day of Indigenous Peoples (Indigenous Peoples) on August 9, 2009 through an event in Church Worship Lahai Roi, Mansinam Island, led by the Chairman of the Congregation for the support Mansinam Island village head Mansinam Mr. Rumbrawer and Chief Arfak Mountains, Mr. Keliopas Meidodga.

The WPLO officially registered as a CSO (Civil Society Organization) in the Economic and Social Council of the United Nations (United Nations Economic and Social Council) in December 2010. It works together with the UN High Commissioner for Human Rights (Organization of the United Nations High Commissioner for Human Rights) at the UN Headquarters in Geneva, Switzerland. In addition, WPLO promotes self-determination annually at the UN Permanent Forum Session on Indigenous Populations (United Nations Permanent on Indigenous Issues) at United Nations Headquarters in New York, USA, as well as the General Assembly of the United Nations High Commissioner for Periodic Human Rights (Universal periodic Review of the UN OHCHR) at the UN headquarters in Geneva, Switzerland.

The WPLO seeks to promote the self-determination of West Papuans by the International Covenant on Civil Rights and Political Section 1 and the United Nations Declaration on the Rights of Indigenous Peoples, as well as Article 3 of Law No. 12 In 2005 of the Republic of Indonesia on the Ratification of the International Covenant on Civil Rights and Politics.
