= Intan Jaya Regency =

Regency in Central Papua, Indonesia

Intan Jaya Regency Kabupaten Intan Jaya
- Regency
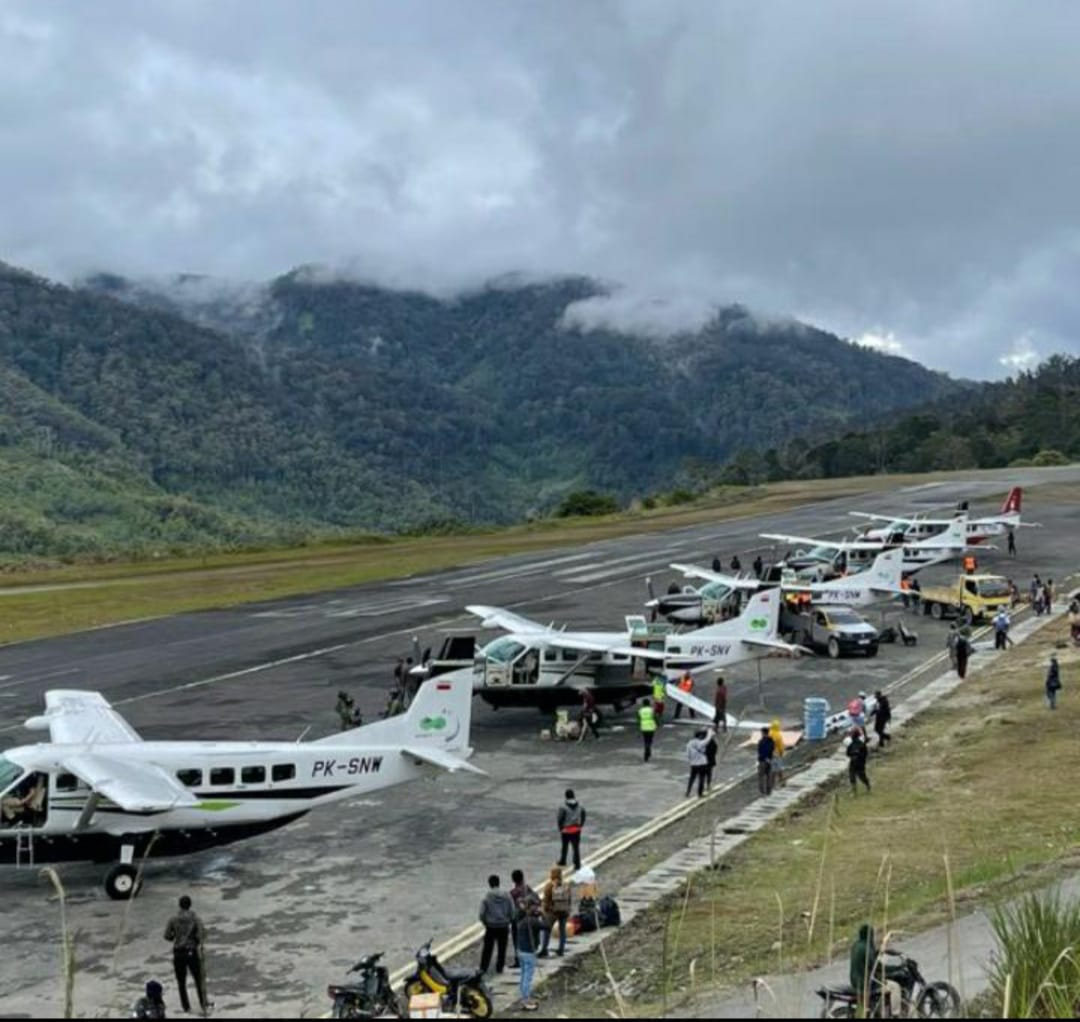
- Bilorai Airport in Sugapa

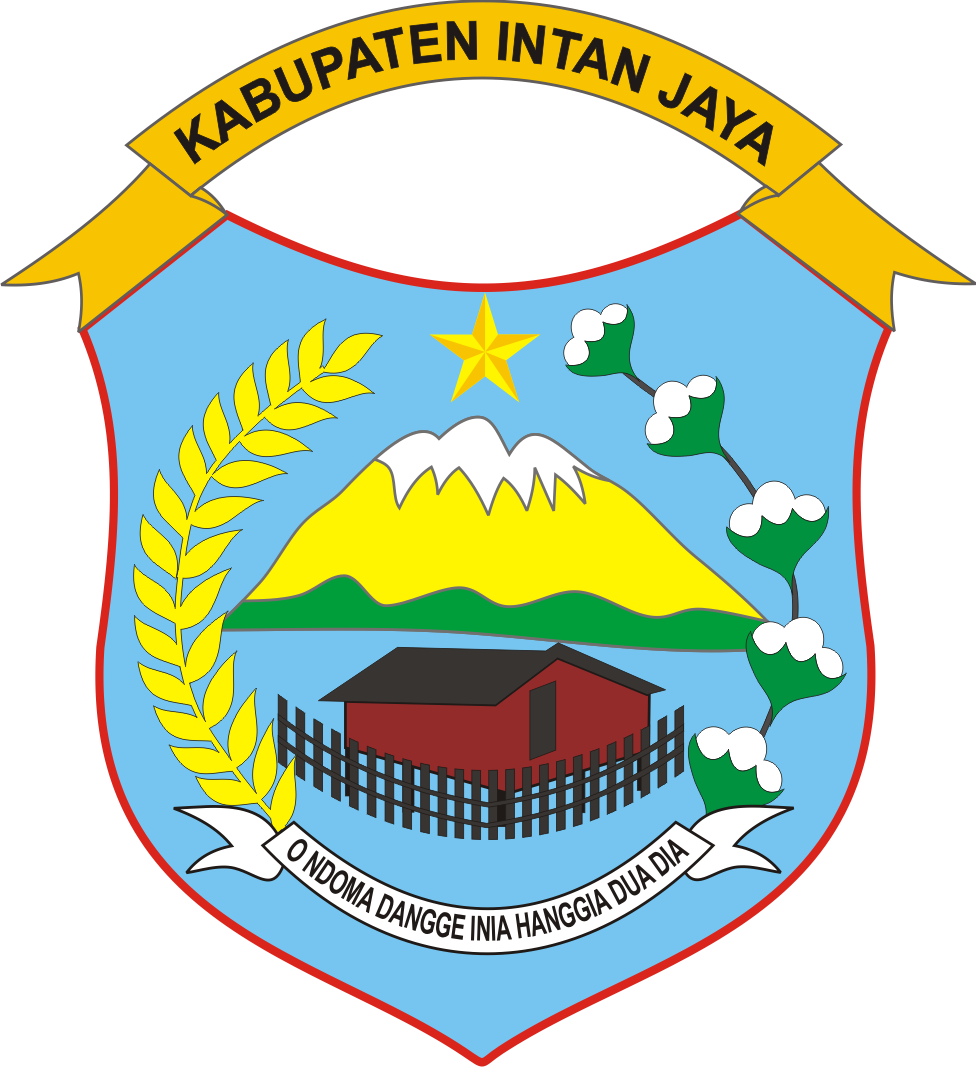
- Coat of arms
- Motto(s): O Ndoma Dangge Inia Hanggia Dua Dia (Seeing, Thinking and Working for All)
- Location in Central Papua

- Location in Indonesian Papua Location in Indonesia
- Coordinates: 3.4102°S 136.7084°E
- Country: Indonesia
- Province: Central Papua
- Capital: Sugapa

Government
  - Regent: Aner Maisini
  - Vice Regent: Elias Igapa

Area
  - Total: 6,536.27 km^{2} (2,523.67 sq mi)

Population (mid 2024 estimate)
  - Total: 137,696
  - Density: 21.0664/km^{2} (54.5619/sq mi)
- Time zone: UTC+9 (Indonesia Eastern Time)
- Area code: (+62) 901
- Website: intanjayakab.go.id

Intan Jaya Regency is one of the regencies (kabupaten) in the Indonesian province of Central Papua; it was formed in 2008 from part of Paniai Regency. It covers an area of 6,536.27 km^{2}, and had a population of 40,490 at the 2010 Census, but this greatly increased to 135,043 at the 2020 Census; the official estimate as of mid 2024 was 137,696 (comprising 71,863 males and 65,833 females). The administrative centre is the town of Sugapa.

== Administrative districts ==
Intan Jaya Regency comprised in 2010 six districts (distrik), tabulated below with their populations at the 2010 Census:

Name of District (distrik)	Pop'n 2010 Census
Homeyo	11,848
Sugapa	9,528
Hitadipa	4,425
Agisiga	5,631
Biandoga	5,087
Wandai	3,971

By 2018, two further districts had been created - Tomosiga and Ugimba. The eight districts are tabulated below with their areas and their populations at the 2020 Census and according to the official estimates for mid 2024. The table also includes the location of the district administrative centres, the number of administrative villages (all rated as rural kampung) in each district, and its post code.

Kode Wilayah	Name of District (distrik)	Area in km^{2}	Pop'n 2020 Census	Pop'n mid 2024 Estimate	Admin centre	No. of villages	Post code
94.07.02	Homeyo	652.78	24,482	26,409	Pogapa	21	98791
94.07.01	Sugapa	248.76	26,214	25,446	Yokatapa	17	98793
94.07.07	Ugimba	469.34	9,898	8,049	Ugimba	6	98794
94.07.06	Hitadipa	477.79	16,427	16,530	Hitadipa	9	98792
94.07.05	Agisiga	1,188.11	13,727	14,670	Nabia	10	98782
94.07.08	Tomosiga	951.56	8,978	8,278	Tomosiga	9	98783
94.07.04	Biandoga	2,339.70	24,553	26,174	Mbiandoga	16	98784
94.07.03	Wandai	208.23	10,764	12,140	Wandai	9	98785
	Totals	6,536.27	135,043	137,696	Sugapa	97	

Most residents are Protestant Christians.
