= Indonesia–Papua New Guinea relations =

- Indonesia: Papua New Guinea

Diplomatic mission
- Embassy of Indonesia, Port Moresby: Embassy of Papua New Guinea, Jakarta

Envoy
- Ambassador Okto Dorinus Manik: Ambassador Simon Wallace Namis

Indonesia–Papua New Guinea relations are foreign relations between Indonesia and Papua New Guinea. The relationship between the two countries has existed for a long time, even before Papua New Guinea's independence, when it was still under Australian control. The Indonesian and Australian governments collaborated to better define the border in the early 1970s.

For Indonesia, Papua New Guinea is an important country as it is one of three countries sharing a land border with Indonesia. The two countries share an 820-kilometre (510 mi) border that has raised tensions and ongoing diplomatic issues over many decades.

Indonesia is represented in Papua New Guinea with an embassy in Port Moresby and a consulate in Vanimo, while Papua New Guinea is represented in Indonesia with an embassy in Jakarta and a consulate-general in Jayapura. Both nations are members of APEC, Non-Aligned Movement and the United Nations.

== History ==
Indonesia was one of the first eight countries to recognize Papua New Guinea's independence on 16 September 1975.

The Indonesian government began the decolonization process in West Papua, a former Dutch colony, in 1963, and international recognition was granted in 1969 following the Act of Free Choice, a controversial referendum, with a voter turnout less than the local population. The Free Papua Movement (Indonesian: Organisasi Papua Merdeka/OPM) was founded in response, aiming to achieve independence from Indonesia. The movement began an armed struggle primarily against the Indonesian Army. The Indonesian government's crackdown on the rebellion in West Papua has led to extensive and ongoing border issues resulting in a prolonged refugee presence and constant movement between Papua and Papua New Guinea.

For Papua New Guinea, the conflict presents two stark choices: solidarity among fellow Melanesian tribes or maintaining good relations with Indonesia, its closest neighbor across the border. Papua New Guinean Prime Minister Michael Somare first visit to Indonesia in 1977 focused on security and economic cooperation, and a desire to establish a joint defense communique. In 1979, President Suharto visited Papua New Guinea for the first time to finalize the points of a defense agreement. He successfully convinced Papua New Guineans to strengthen cooperation for shared prosperity. The massive Indonesian military offensive in Papua, Operation Jayapura, weakened the OPM movement, causing many to flee to the Papua New Guinea border. The Papua New Guinean military culminated in the capture of OPM leaders Jacob Prai and John Ondawame, who took refuge in PNG.

Entering the 1980s, the OPM movement weakened following Indonesia's massive military operation in Jayapura and also due to internal strife within the OPM leadership. According to Kopkamtib (Indonesia's special military intelligence agency), remnants of the OPM movement remained and were hiding around the border with PNG. The Indonesian military launched a new military operation, Operation Clean Sweap (Operasi Sapu Bersih), to hunt down OPM movements on the PNG border.

In a press statement, Papua New Guinea's Foreign Minister, Rabbie Namaliu, protested the Indonesian military's border violations, which triggered a mass exodus of West Papuans to Papua New Guinea. The two governments agreed to resolve the border crisis by updating the 1979 security agreement with a more comprehensive agreement covering refugees, borders, defense and security, and respect for the territorial integrity of both regions. The agreement is called the (Treaty of Mutual Respect, Cooperation and Friendship) which was signed on October 27, 1986. In the agreement, both countries agreed to "avoid, reduce and limit disputes or conflicts between their countries and respect the territorial integrity of both countries and resolve any differences that may arise only by peaceful means". In 1990, the two countries agreed to establish joint border cooperation which includes joint border patrols and a joint security consultation forum.

== Bilateral Relations ==
=== Trade ===
Trade between the two countries amounted to US$383 million in 2024, with US$216 million of exports from Indonesia and US$167 million of exports from Papua New Guinea. The balance of trade between the two countries used to be considerably more in favor of Indonesia, which ran a US$117 million surplus in 2018. A preferential trade agreement between the two countries have been considered.

A major export by PNG to Indonesia is cocoa beans, which boomed in the 2020s. Around US$100 million of cocoa beans are exported from PNG to Indonesia in 2024. Vanilla is another commodity exported from PNG to Indonesia, with vanilla trading firm Aust & Hachmann estimating that 50 percent of PNG's vanilla production was traded across the border in 2023. The main Indonesian exports to PNG are food products such as instant noodles and cooking oil, along with electronics, soaps, fertilizers, and metals. The first Indonesia–Papua New Guinea Business Forum was held in 2023, attended by president Joko Widodo and PM James Marape.

=== Refugees ===
Due to conflict adjacent to the border between the two countries, refugees have crossed the border regularly. The largest amount of refugees originated in 1984, with over 10,000 Papuans from the Indonesian side crossing the border. The main issue of refugees is from conflict between Indonesian national security forces, and various groups of disaffected groups in West Papua seeking refuge in the Papua New Guinea territory. After the fall of Suharto, in some cases some refugees were repatriated back to Indonesia.

== See also ==
- 141st meridian east
- Foreign relations of Indonesia
- Foreign relations of Papua New Guinea
- Indonesia–Papua New Guinea border
