= Yotam Bugiangge =

Indonesian Army defector and a commander of West Papua National Liberation Army

- Born: 24 May 1999 (age 27); Gunia, Jayawijaya Regency, Papua, Indonesia
- Military career
- Allegiance: Indonesia (until 2021); Free Papua Movement (2021–present)
- Branch: Indonesian Army; West Papua National Liberation Army
- Rank: Private second class
- Conflicts: Papua conflict: Operation Cartenz's Peace; Nogolait shooting; Nduga hostage crisis

Yotam Bugiangge (born 24 May 1999) is an Indonesian Army defector and a commander of West Papua National Liberation Army.

== Biography ==
Born on 24 May 1999 in Gunia and belonging to Nduga people, Bugiangge joined the Indonesian Army in an unknown year and was enlisted in the 756th Infantry Battalion. Within the battalion, he was assigned to Company C, which is based in Senggi, Keerom Regency, with a rank of private second class. He was deserted from military duty, bringing SS1-V1 without any ammunition on 17 December 2021. Later on, Bugiangge reportedly joined the Egianus Kogoya's West Papua National Liberation Army group. As a result, the Indonesian Army fired Bugiangge from the military service and he became a fugitive.

Bugiangge led a group of OPM militia. His group was responsible for Nogolait shooting and the 2023 gold panners massacre in Yahukimo. In 2023, Bugiangge's group separated from the Kogoya command.
