= Mimika hostage crisis =

- Part of Papua conflict
- Map of Mimika District in Indonesian Papua
Date	17 August 2026 – present; (2 months and 26 days)
Location	Mimika Regency, Central Papua, Indonesia
Status	Ongoing

Belligerents
Indonesia; Indonesian National Armed Forces; Indonesian National Police	(Free Papua Movement) TPNPB-OPM

Units involved
Operation Cartenz's Peace; TNI; POLRI	(Free Papua Movement) Kodap III Ndugama-Derakma (disputed)

Strength
20+	15

Casualties and losses
1 killed 2 wounded	None
- 9 civilians abducted (1 killed, 1 escaped); 1 civilian killed

A hostage crisis began in Mimika Regency, Central Papua, Indonesia, on the 17th of August, 2026, when insurgents of the Free Papua Movement (Indonesian: Organisasi Papua Merdeka, OPM) attacked an Indonesian Independence Day event and took nine women and girls hostage.

== Background ==
Jila District, the location of the attack, is a remote district in the hinterlands of Mimika Regency, Central Papua Province, 2.800 metres above sea level. Due to its remoteness, the district of just under 4,000 inhabitants have no road access linking it to Timika, the capital of Mimika Regency, 90 kilometres away. Consequently, the only method of transportation available is by aeroplane.

Prior to the 81st anniversary of Indonesian independence on 17 August 2026, representatives of the West Papua National Liberation Army (TPNPB), OPM's armed wing, had warned the Indonesian government and indigenous Papuans against holding or attending Independence Day celebrations in Papua. Immediately prior to the incident, security incidents occurred in Intan Jaya Regency and Tolikara Regency.

== Attack ==
At 8.12am on the morning of 17 August 2026, 15 militants from the Kodap III/Ndugama (some other sources identified Pok III Puncak as the TPNPB unit involved) and under the command of Botak Wanimbo entered and attacked Jila District from three separate directions and struck the local TNI post. In the ensuing firefight, one TNI personnel, identified as First Private Rizki Kurniawan, was killed, while two other TNI personnel were wounded.

Around 10am on the same day, Indonesian security forces began to force the TPNPB out of Jila District. As they were leaving the area, TPNPB militants forcibly took nine indigenous Papuan women and girls with them. Three of the nine victims were 18 years old, while the rest are children under the age of 18, including a pregnant 17-year old. When local residents attempted to prevent the kidnapping, TPNPB militants reacted violently, fatally shooting a local mother and injuring another.

By 21 August, it was reported that TPNPB militants and the nine women and girls had moved to the neighbouring Alama District, on the border with Nduga Regency, Highland Papua.

On the aftermath of the attack, the Indonesian National Police deployed 20 personnel in the area to secure the release of the hostages, along with an unknown number of TNI personnel.

On 1 September, it was revealed that two hostages had successfully escaped the TPNPB. They were found on 9 September in Alama District, one of which has died, bringing the remaining number of abductees to seven.

== Impact ==
The attack severely disrupted the region's activities. Two airlines serving Jila District stopped operating pending an improvement in security. In fears of further TPNPB attacks on public service workers, the Mimika Regency government evacuated medical workers, teachers, and civil servants from Jila District on 18 August.

The local government and TNI distributed four tonnes of humanitarian supplies for local residents affected by the attack, starting on 22 August.

== Responses ==
The attack and ensuing hostage crisis drew condemnation from the local government and indigenous Amungme communities.
