= Battle of Mugi (2019) =

- Part of Papua conflict
- Location of Nduga Regency in Indonesian Papua
Date	7 March 2019
Location	Mugi, Nduga Regency, Papua, Indonesia
Result	Indonesian victory

Belligerents
Indonesia	(Free Papua Movement) West Papua National Liberation Army

Units involved
Operation Nemangkawi; TNI Law Enforcement Task Force	3rd Regional Defence Commando

Strength
25	50–70

Casualties and losses
Indonesian claim: 3 killed 2 helicopters damaged TPNPB claim: 5 killed	Indonesian claim: 7–10 killed TPNPB claim: None

The Battle of Mugi was fought between the Indonesian Army (TNI-AD) and the West Papua National Liberation Army (TPNPB) on 7 March 2019 in Mugi District, Nduga Regency, Papua province, Indonesia. The attack, which killed three Indonesian military personnel and 7-10 TPNPB militants, is the single deadliest military engagement in Indonesia in 2019, and was the deadliest single military engagement in Operation Nemangkawi until surpassed by the 2021 Maybrat attack.

== Background ==
The Indonesian government under the presidency of Joko Widodo used development of civilian infrastructure, particularly the construction of roads, as a method to curb the influence of the Free Papua Organisation (OPM) and its military wing, the West Papua National Liberation Army (TPNPB). This was especially true in Nduga Regency, Papua province (now part of Highland Papua province), a remote and isolated mountainous regency sitting within the New Guinea Highlands.

A major project was the construction of the Trans-Papua Highway, which started in 1980 but picked up pace during Joko Widodo's presidency. In 2018, the TPNPB perpetrated a massacre against construction workers in Nduga, which further intensified military presence in the area after a brief pause in road construction. By late 2018, the Indonesian security apparatus had deployed 1,000 personnel in the Nduga area, partly in order to protect road construction.

== Battle ==
At 8 a.m. on 7 March 2019, a TPNPB unit of 50-70 militants under the command of Egianus Kogoya (which called themselves as the 3rd Regional Defence Commando Ndugama) engaged a small 'law enforcement task force' (Satgas Gakkum) of 25 Indonesian military personnel in Mugi District, Nduga Regency. The task force had just been deployed in the area to cover the rotation of personnel securing the construction of the Trans-Papua Highway. Attacking from the highlands, the TPNPB force used both "military grade weapons" and traditional weapons such as bows and arrows and spears.

Indonesian security personnel conducted a fierce resistance against the TPNPB attack and managed to repel the attack, causing the TPNPB unit to retreat from the battlefield. In the engagement, three TNI soldiers were killed: Second Sergeant Mirwariyadin, Second Sergeant Yusdin, and Second Sergeant Siswanto Bayu Aji. The Indonesian armed forces further claimed that 7-10 TPNPB militants were killed in the engagement, but their bodies, save for one, were recovered by the rebel group. Five firearms belonging to the TPNPB were captured by the TNI.

TPNPB spokesperson Sebby Sambom claimed that TPNPB militants had killed five Indonesian military personnel and suffered no losses, in addition to four firearms captured from the TNI. This claim was refuted by the TNI, owing to the improbability of TPNPB fighters approaching TNI positions in lower altitudes to capture TNI firearms.

At 3 p.m., TNI casualties were evacuated by Bell 412 helicopters to Timika. During the evacuation process, the helicopters were shot at by TPNPB militants without incurring any additional casualties to the TNI.

== Aftermath ==
President Joko Widodo in a statement the day following the attack ordered the TNI to "chase and finish" the perpetrators of the attack. The TNI deployed 600 soldiers from Makassar to the general area of Nduga the Saturday following the attack and TNI three companies to pursue the particular TPNPB unit involved in the attack.

The TPNPB unit involved in the battle, the 3rd Regional Defence Commando under the command of Egianus Kogoya, was responsible for the deaths of four more Indonesian security personnel in 2019, in addition to another soldier who they had previously killed in January 2019, ranking it as the most dangerous fighting force of the TPNPB in the year.

== Reactions ==
Indonesian government officials provided differing reactions to the battle. Coordinating Minister for Political and Security Affairs, General (Ret.) Wiranto supported the deployment of additional troops to Nduga. The Speaker of the Indonesian House of Representatives, Bambang Soesatyo, called on the government and the TNI to "escalate force" in Nduga.

Lenis Kogoya, a native Papuan who was a special staffer for President Joko Widodo urged the government to withdraw the 600-strong TNI reinforcement to Nduga and withhold offensives until after the 2019 Indonesian general election.
