= Nogolait shooting =

2022 mass murder in West Papua

- Part of the Papua conflict
- Nduga Regency shaded on a map of western New Guinea
- Location: Nogolait, Nduga Regency, Highland Papua, Indonesia
- Date: 16 July 2022
- Target: Local civilians
- Attack type: Mass shooting
- Weapons: Long-barrelled weapons and sharp weapons
- Deaths: 11
- Injuries: 2
- Perpetrators: (Free Papua Movement) West Papua National Liberation Army (Egianus Kogoya and Army Tabuni group)
- No. of participants: 15–20

On 16 July 2022, a group of around 20 gunmen armed with long-barreled weapons and blades entered the Kampung of Nonggolait (or Nogolait) in Nduga Regency, Highland Papua, Indonesia. The attackers opened fire on a grocer, and then shot seven traders riding on a freight truck. Four bystanders were also shot.

During the shooting, eleven people were killed and two were wounded. All of the victims were men, most of whom came from other Indonesian islands. Victims of the attack were Daeng Maramhli (42) ustad (Muslim cleric) of Nonggolait, Rev. Eliaser Baye (54) indigenous priest of Nonggolait from Kenyam, Yulius Watu (23), Habertus Goti (23), Taufah Amir (42), Johan (26), Alex (45), Sirajudin (27), Yuda Gurusinga (42), dan Mahmud Ismaul (50), driver for the Regent of Nduga. Meanwhile, survivors of the attack were Hasjon (41) severely harmed, and Sudarmintao hit by ricochet. Meanwhile, the body of a construction worker Roy Manampiring (42) was found not far from the incident, according to local inhabitants travelling with him, the armed group block their route on their journey home to Nonggolait and killed Manampiring while the other fled to the jungle.

Indonesian authorities suspected the Free Papua Movement's militant wing, the West Papua National Liberation Army (TPNPB), of responsibility, specifically of Army Tabuni and Egianus Kogoya group. One of the perpetrators of the attack is Yotam Bugiangge, an Indonesian Army (TNI-AD) deserter with the former rank of Private Second Class. The Indonesian National Police claimed that Bugiangge is one of the masterminds of the attack together with Kogoya. The TPNPB claimed responsibility for the attack which was carried out by Egianus Kogoya, commander of Regional War Command (Kodap) III Ndugama-Derakma of the TPNPB, and his armed group and threatened to shoot more civilians including teachers and nurses.

On 29 May 2023, the Indonesian National Police arrested "AK", a wanted TPNPB member from Kogoya's group who was involved in the attack.

== Responses ==
The Indonesian Presidential Staff Office condemned the attack and promised legal action towards the perpetrators.

The Communion of Churches in Indonesia (PGI) issued a five-point communique on 18 July, offering condolences on the death of Rev. Eliaser Baye. The communique also urged the Indonesian government to form an independent team to investigate the attack and the Indonesian security forces to utilize a "cultural approach" to prevent similar occurrences in the future.

Amnesty International urged the Indonesian government to "stop the cycle of violence" and evaluate its approach on handling the Papua issue.

== See also ==
- Nduga massacre
- Telkomsel shooting
