= 1976 Jayapura operation =

1976 Jayapura operations
- Part of the Papua conflict
Date	January–February 1976
Location	Southern parts of Jayapura Regency, Irian Jaya
Result	Indonesian victory; OPM severely weakened

Belligerents
Indonesia	(Republic of West Papua) Free Papua Movement

Commanders and leaders
Brig.Gen Imam Munandar	Unknown

Strength
10,000–16,000 troops 2 aircraft	c. 3,000–5,000 fighters (Note: After the offensive, West Papuan representatives abroad stated that there were 3,000 to 5,000 fighters remaining.)

Casualties and losses
Indonesian claim: Minor losses OPM claim: 425 killed 800 wounded	OPM claim: (Note: Claim includes villagers and supporters killed in the fighting and aerial attack.); 1,605 fighters killed

In early 1976, the Indonesian Army launched an offensive against Free Papua Movement (OPM) military elements in the southern parts of Jayapura Regency, in what is today Papua. While the operation failed to completely destroy OPM's presence, the organization was considerably weakened militarily from its losses.

== Background ==
Following the New York Agreement, administration of Western New Guinea was transferred from the Netherlands (as Netherlands New Guinea) to Indonesia. The agreement contained provisions for self-determination for the Papuans, which resulted in the controversial Act of Free Choice in July 1969, whereas around 1,000 selected representatives all voted unanimously for incorporation. The representatives had no members which were opposed to unification, and by July 1971 the Free Papua Movement issued a proclamation of independence for "The Republic of West Papua New Guinea".

Containing both a political and a military wing, the OPM was the only organization which conducted armed opposition against Indonesia, with its military consisting primarily of irregular fighters with few regulars. OPM's primary base of operations at the time, also known as Markas Victoria (Victoria Base), was located southeast of Jayapura, around the Keerom region.

== Operations ==
Following an aerial bombardment by two OV-10 Bronco aircraft, around 10,000 soldiers were dropped onto the area south of Jayapura near the border with Papua New Guinea. The number of Indonesian soldiers involved were around 10,000, with reports reaching up to 16,000 soldiers.

In the operation, OPM claimed that 425 Indonesian Army personnel were killed and 800 were wounded, while the Indonesian government stated that losses were minor. The OPM reported 1,605 killed, including armed regulars, sympathizers, and local villagers alike. According to OPM spokesmen located abroad, the organization still had a fighting strength of 3,000 to 5,000 men.

== Aftermath ==
Brigadier general Imam Munandar, the commander of the Papuan military region for the Indonesian Army, stated that the OPM had been "reduced to scattered remnants". The operation resulted in a significant setback for the OPM's military capabilities, but the Indonesian government failed to achieve its objective of destroying the organization by 1977. Richard Woolcott, Australian Ambassador to Indonesia at the time, visited the border regions in early 1977 and reported that there were "not more than twenty rebels", though armed conflict continued in the Papuan highlands.

OPM was further weakened by an internal split, where OPM's leaders Jacob Prai and Seth Rumkorem split ways, and most of OPM fighters joined Prai's organization. Though both leaders eventually were arrested in Papua New Guinea and went into asylum in Sweden, OPM remained active in Papua, with leaders such as Kelly Kwalik leading a number of small-scale military operations denying total control by the Indonesian Armed Forces.

== Bibliography ==
Osborne, Robin (2001). Kibaran Sampari: gerakan pembebasan OPM, dan perang rahasia di Papua Barat (in Indonesian). Lembaga Studi dan Advokasi Masyarakat (ELSAM). ISBN 9789798981227.
Savage, Peter; Martin, Rose (1977). "The OPM in West Papua New Guinea: The continuing struggle against Indonesian colonialism". Journal of Contemporary Asia. 7 (3): 338–346. doi:10.1080/00472337785390341.
