= Nduga hostage crisis =

2023 incident in Highland Papua, Indonesia

Nduga Hostage Crisis
- Part of the Papua conflict
- Nduga Regency in Highland Papua, Indonesia
Date	7 February 2023 – 21 September 2024 (1 year, 7 months and 2 weeks)
Location	Nduga Regency, Highland Papua, Indonesia
Status	Hostages released

Belligerents
Indonesia; Indonesian National Armed Forces; Indonesian National Police; New Zealand	(Free Papua Movement) TPNPB-OPM

Commanders and leaders
(Indonesia) Agus Subiyanto (Indonesia) Izak Pangemanan (Indonesia) Listyo Sigit Prabowo (Indonesia) Mathius Fakhiri (Indonesia) Faizal Ramadhani	(Free Papua Movement) Egianus Kogoya (Free Papua Movement) Army Tabuni (Free Papua Movement) Yotam Bugiangge (Free Papua Movement) Keneganus Wasiangge †

Units involved
Operation Cartenz's Peace; TNI; POLRI	(Free Papua Movement) Kodap III Ndugama-Derakma; (Free Papua Movement) Aluguru Battalion; (Free Papua Movement) Wosak Battalion; (Free Papua Movement) Pintu Battalion

Casualties and losses
1 New Zealander pilot abducted 15 soldiers killed	13 killed
- 4 civilians killed 162 civilians internally displaced

The Nduga hostage crisis began on 7 February 2023 when Free Papua Movement (Indonesian: Organisasi Papua Merdeka, OPM) insurgents attacked a plane and took its pilot and all five passengers hostage. While the passengers were soon released, New Zealander pilot Phillip Mark Mehrtens remained in captivity until 21 September 2024.

== Background ==
On 4 February 2023, fifteen civilian workers building a puskesmas clinic for the District of Paro were threatened by the Free Papua Movement (OPM), which alleged that some of them were spies of the Indonesian government, as some of them were allegedly not carrying their national identity cards.

== Timeline ==
=== First week ===
location of Paro airport

On 7 February 2023 at 06:17 a.m. WIT, a Pilatus PC-6 Porter aircraft with the registration number PK-BVY belonging to Susi Air arrived from Timika to Paro airport, Nduga. Shortly after landing, it lost contact with air traffic control. A search was conducted from the air, which soon sighted a burning aircraft. The fate of the New Zealand pilot and the Indonesian passengers (local Nduga Papuan; Demanus Gwijangge, Minda Gwijangge, Pelenus Gwijangge, Meita Gwijangge and an infant, Wetina W) was not known at this point.

A few hours after the sighting, the Indonesian National Armed Forces (TNI) stated that it was likely that the passengers had been taken hostage by the OPM, who were also accused of setting the plane on fire. On the same day, OPM spokesman Sebby Sambom confirmed these allegations, claiming that the operation was led by Egianus Kogoya, a local TPNPB-OPM commander. OPM stated that the passengers, who were Indonesian nationals, had already been released, but that the pilot would only be delivered if the Indonesian government recognised the independence of West Papua, and otherwise would be killed. By then, the hostage had been taken further away from the area according to the organisation. OPM considered New Zealand, Indonesia, Australia, Europe, and the United States to be responsible. In addition, OPM took hostage the workers who had been building the puskesmas clinic.

By 8 February, civilian workers had been evacuated from the area by the Indonesian National Police. Units of police and army were deployed to evacuate the fifteen civilian workers with three helicopters. The evacuation operation was slowed down by bad weather and had to be suspended, but was later completed. In the evening of 8 February, the police claimed that all passengers of the plane had been evacuated.

On 8 February the Indonesian Ministry of Transportation closed the airport down as the remains of the burned aircraft could not be moved and were blocking the runway. On the same day Commander of the Indonesian National Armed Forces Yudo Margono stated that they had previously warned Susi Air not to conduct flights to Nduga as the area was dangerous with minimal security forces. Margono also claimed that he didn't know that Susi Air had been regularly flying to Nduga. This despite Susi Air having flown regular, scheduled flights to Paro District and nearby Kilmid District for years on a government contract for subsidized air services.

In the days following Mehrtens' kidnapping, the TNI deployed two battalions of the elite special forces Kopassus' Unit 81 counter-terrorism force to Timika, which became a staging post for the rescue operation. Authorities evacuated thousands of people from around Paro airport, Nduga Regency, Lanny Jaya Regency, and Puncak in an effort to deny Kogoya's group community assistance. In addition, soldiers blocked key positions in the Central Highlands in order to prevent Kogoya's brother Undinus from assisting Kogoya's group.

=== Second week ===
On 14 February, members of the West Papua National Liberation Army (TPNPB), the armed wing of the OPM, released several photos and videos of the New Zealand pilot Phillip Mark Mehrtens to the Associated Press. The rebel spokesperson Sebby Sambom stated that his group had released the five civilian hostages since they were indigenous Papuans. In their videos, the rebels reiterated their demand for West Papuan independence.

On 14 February, Indonesian coordinating minister for Political, Security and Legal Affairs Mohammad Mahfud confirmed that the Indonesian Government was working to secure Mehrtens' release and reiterated that West Papua was part of Indonesia. Papua police chief Mathius Fakhiri also confirmed that local authorities were working with tribal and religious community leaders to negotiate with the rebels.

That same week, a TNI spokesperson told the Australian Broadcasting Corporation (ABC) that Indonesian security forces were working to identify Mehrtens' exact location before attempting to rescue him. The New Zealand Ministry of Foreign Affairs and Trade (MFAT) confirmed that it was working with the Indonesian Government and other agencies to secure Mehrtens' release and stated that his family had asked for privacy.

By 17 February, Matthius Fakhiri issued a statement that it believed they had identified the location where Mehrtens was being held hostage. Papua Police dispatched a negotiation team consisting of local politicians to make contact with TPNPB forces.

=== Third week ===
On 23 February, Indonesian authorities claimed that Kogoya had offered to exchange firearms and ammunition for Mehrtens' release, and that the offer had been rejected.

On 24 February, the United Liberation Movement for West Papua's (ULMWP) leader Benny Wenda called for Mehrtens' captors to release him.

In late February 2023, Deakin University Emeritus Professor Damien Kingsbury was authorised by the TPNPB to serve as their intermediary with the New Zealand Government due to his previous work with Free Papuan groups. As intermediary, Kingsbury regularly liaised with a New Zealand Police hostage negotiator. Kingsbury's involvement in the hostage negotiation process ceased around late May 2023 after the New Zealand Government decided to use a new communication channel. The TPNPB did not accept this change of communication channel.

=== March 2023 ===
On 1 March, Indonesian chief security minister Mahfud MD confirmed that Indonesian security forces had found the location of Kogoya's group but would refrain from conducting actions that might endanger the life of hostage Mehrtens.

On 9 March, Senior Commander Faizal Ramadani, the Head of Cartenz Peace Operation, confirmed that Kogoya's group had rejected peace negotiations with the Indonesian authorities.

On 10 March, TPNPB-OPM released a second video by Mehrtens urging foreign pilots to avoid flying and working in Highland Papua until West Papua is independent.

By 17 March, Kogoya's men, still with Mehrtens, had retreated into West Papua's Central Highlands. Commander of the Indonesian National Armed Forces Admiral Yudo Margono reiterated Indonesian authorities' commitment towards a peaceful solution, but declined an offer from New Zealand Ambassador Kevin Burnett to facilitate low-level negotiations between OPM intermediaries, local district officials and religious leaders. According to the Indonesian Police, Kogoya killed an eight-year-old boy after the child's father, a local village head, had refused to supply the group with food.

On 22 March, Radio New Zealand reported that Jeffery Bomanak, the chair of the Free Papua Movement (OPM), stated that the group was willing to negotiate with both the Indonesian Government and TPNPB-OPM to secure the safe release of Mehrtens. Bomanak also urged Indonesia not to launch any military operations that could endanger Mehrtens' life.

On 23 March, Indonesian security forces launched an offensive against Nduga's TPNPB-OPM group holding Mehrtens captive, prompting a response by the TPNPB-OPM. TPNPB-OPM condemned the attack as a violation of the New Zealand Government's request for non-violence. TPNPB-OPM claimed that one of its members had died during the attack and claimed to have shot four Indonesian security personnel, killing one soldier and a police officer.

=== April 2023 ===
On 12 April, a member of an armed group involved in the hostage crisis was arrested by Cartenz Peace Operation.

On 26 April, Mehrtens' captors released a video statement by Mehrtens stating he was alive and well. Mehrtens also called upon the Indonesian Army to stop bombing the area to avoid endangering him. He claimed that he was being well-treated by his captors. Mehrtens also appeared to be wearing restraints around his neck and wrist.

=== May 2023 ===
On 26 May, a new video by Mehrtens' captors was released, in which, Mehrtens revealed new information that if secession talks did not begin with Indonesia "within two months, then they say they will shoot me." New Zealand's foreign ministry commented that they were working closely with Indonesian authorities and deploying consular staff, to ensure a "peaceful resolution" and Mehrtens' "safe release".

=== July 2023 ===
TPNPB spokesperson Sebby Sambom stated that the organization had called off previous threats to execute Mehrtens if rebel demands were not met, as the TPNPB has considered Merhtens as "a friend and family".

On 3 July, President Joko Widodo stated that the Indonesian government "will continue to attempt negotiations" with the insurgents to release pilot Mehrtens. On 9 July, the head of the Papua Regional Police, Mathius Fakhiri, stated that the Indonesian National Police and the Nduga Regency government has offered Rp5 billion (US$320,000) to the Kogoya group to ransom Mehrtens, while refusing the insurgents' demands for weapons, ammunition, or total independence for Papua. Kogoya refused the offer, refusing to accept any money from the Indonesian government.

=== August 2023 ===
On 9 August, New Zealand Prime Minister Chris Hipkins called for the immediate release of Mehrtens, stating that his safety was the top priority and that the six-month milestone was difficult for his family.

On 16 August, three civilians: two native Papuan civil servants and one migrant from Sulawesi, were tortured and killed by the TPNPB in Nduga Regency.

=== September 2023 ===
On 1 September, the TNI ambushed a TPNPB command base in Aluguru Village, Nduga Regency. In the engagement, three TPNPB fighters were killed. A number of firearms, ammunition, and documents were seized. Later these men were identified as Ganti Gwijangge, Werak Lokbere, and Arikheba Kogeya.

On 7 September, Indonesian Police arrested a TPNPB member in Asmat Regency, South Papua, who withdrew Rp100 million (US$6,300) from a bank in order to buy supplies for Kogoya and his group. Another TPNPB member was arrested in Nabire Regency, Central Papua, for supplying ammunition to Kogoya's group.

On 15 September, the TNI killed five members of Yotam Bugiangge's Armed Group from Nduga who had fled to Yahukimo near the Brazza River. They were initially considered as members of Elkius Kobak's group (Kodap XVI Yahukimo), or Yahukimo locals, however they were not recognized by Sebby Sambom and Elkius Kobak of TPNPB-OPM, or by local tribal leader, Leo Ghiban, as local civilians.

=== November 2023 ===
On 21 November, the New Zealand Foreign Ministry (MFAT) confirmed the authenticity of a new video of Mehrtens circulating on social media. The video showed Mehrtens surrounded by armed men claiming that he had been given two months to live before being shot dead. The MFAT confirmed that it was working with Indonesian authorities and New Zealand consular staff to secure Mehrtens' release, and was supporting his family members in Indonesia and New Zealand. In response, TPNPB-OPM spokesperson Akouboo Amatus Douw claimed that Mehrtens was alive and healthy, and that the video dated back to May or June 2023. He also said that the TPNPB wanted to release Mehrtens "very soon" but that his release depended on the New Zealand and Indonesian governments.

=== December 2023 ===
On 27 December, Sebby Sambom speaking to BBC News Indonesia said TPNPB-OPM Headquarters did not authorize the release of new photo of Mehrtens and Egianus Kogoya. He also added, TPNPB-OPM leaders had agreed to release Mehrtens back in May, however this was rejected by Kogoya.

=== February 2024 ===
On 5 February, New Zealand Foreign Minister Winston Peters reiterated calls for the release of Mehrtens. On 22 February, a shootout near the Brazza River in Yahukimo, after the shooting of Wings Air flight IW 1646 on 17 February, resulted in the death of one member of the Wosak Battalion (Yotam Bugiangge's group), a member of the Ndugama-Darakma faction.

=== April 2024 ===
On 19 April, the TNI injured two members of the TPNPB-OPM in an engagement. One pistol, ammunition, and several bows and arrows were captured as a result of the engagement, while the two militants managed to escape.

=== July 2024 ===
On 16 July, Sebby Sambom announced the death of Keneganus Wasiangge, the field commander of Pintu Battalion, who joined since 2016. He was killed in a shootout with Indonesian security forces in Trans Sinak road on 29 June. On 26 July, members of the Ndugama faction attacked a TNI post in Yigi District, Nduga Regency manned by Yonif 432/WSJ, resulted in the death of a TPNPB member named Engabub, and two other TPNPB members injured.

=== September 2024 ===
On 21 September, Phillip Mehrtens was released from captivity following prolonged negotiations between the TPNPB, Indonesian authorities and New Zealand government agencies. On 17 September, the TPNPB had released a statement outlining several conditions for his release including allowing "open access" to the media, for the Indonesian government to suspend military operations during his release and for the New Zealand Government to allow Mehrtens to voice his feelings about his time with the TPNPB. Mehrtens was freed and picked up by a joint team in Nduga Regency and underwent health checks and a physiological examination in Timika regency. Mehrtens spoke to his family by phone and later attended a press conference before flying to Jakarta in an Indonesian Air Force plane. Indonesian Army lieutenant general Bambang Trisnohadi confirmed that Mehrtens was in "good health."

Indonesian President Joko Widodo confirmed that Mehrtens' release had been secured through negotiation rather than force while Brigadier General Faizal Ramadhani acknowledged the role of religious leaders, traditional leaders and Egianus Kogoya in the hostage negotiation process. New Zealand Foreign Minister Peters welcomed Mehrtens' release and credited several agencies including the MFAT with securing Mehrtens' release. New Zealand Prime Minister Christopher Luxon also issued a statement welcoming Mehrtens' release on X.

== Indonesian military casualties ==
On 3 April 2023, Private First Class Hamdan of the TNI was killed in action by the TPNPB when guarding the TNI post in Yal District, Nduga Regency.

On 15 April, Private First Class Arifin of the TNI was killed in action by the TPNPB in Mugi-Mam, Nduga Regency. He was shot by the TPNPB and fell into a 15-metre deep ravine. The evacuation of his body was complicated by TPNPB attacks and bad weather. In response to his killing, TNI Commander Yudo Margono promised to evaluate the ongoing TNI operation to free Mehrtens.

On 17 April, Stuff reported that members of the West Papua Liberation Army had attacked 36 Indonesian soldiers at a post in Nduga Regency (Mugi-Mam districts, 100 km north of Paro.) At least six soldiers were killed and 21 others fled into the jungle. Nine soldiers were reportedly held captive by the rebels on 15 April. TNI spokesperson Colonel Herman Taryaman confirmed that the soldiers were part of a group searching for Mehrtens and that Indonesian authorities were searching for about 30 missing soldiers. Rebel spokesperson Sebby Sambom stated that the West Papua Liberation Army's fighters had carried out the attack in retaliation for the killing of two rebels during a shootout with Indonesian security forces in March 2023. Sambom called on the Indonesian Government to halt its military operations in West Papua in return for negotiations with the Indonesian and New Zealand governments, and claimed 13 Indonesian soldiers were killed in the engagement. On 18 April, TNI Commander Yudo Margono confirmed four Indonesian soldiers killed from the engagement (Private First Class Ibrahim, Private First Class Kurniawan, Private Second Class Sukra, and Private Arifin who was previously killed on 15 April), one missing, five wounded, and 26 in good condition with no injury. On 23 April, the last missing soldier, known only as Private First Class "F", was confirmed dead.

On 30 May, an engagement between the TPNPB and the TNI in Nduga Regency resulted in the deaths of three TNI personnel: Second Lieutenant Afriadi, First Sergeant Marlin and Master Private Sugeng, with two others wounded, Second Sergeant Hendry and Second Sergeant Wahyu.

On 25 November, the TPNPB's Kodap III Ndugama attacked a TNI post of the 411/Pandawa Infantry Battalion of the Kostrad in Paro District, Nduga Regency. The attack killed four TNI soldiers: Master Private Ladou, Master Private Sinimoko, First Private Firdaus, and Second Private Dermawan. Three other TNI soldiers were wounded. On 30 November, the post was attacked again by the TPNPB, resulting in the deaths of two other soldiers: First Private "S" and Second Private "P".

== Notes ==
1. 3 April: Hamdan
15 April: Arifin (fell into ravine)
19 April: Ibrahim, Kurniawan, Sukra
23 April: F
30 May: Afriadi, Sugeng, Marlin
25 November: Ladou, Sinimoko, Firdaus, Dermawan
30 November: P, S

2.2 Killed in March 2023
3 Killed in September 2023; Ganti Gwijangge, Werak Lokbere, Arikheba Kogeya
5 killed in September 2023
22 February 2024: Otniel "Bolong" Giban
July 2024: Keneganus Wasiangge, Engabub
