= Papuan Volunteer Corps =

Volunteer corps during the West New Guinea dispute

- Papua Vrijwilligers Korps
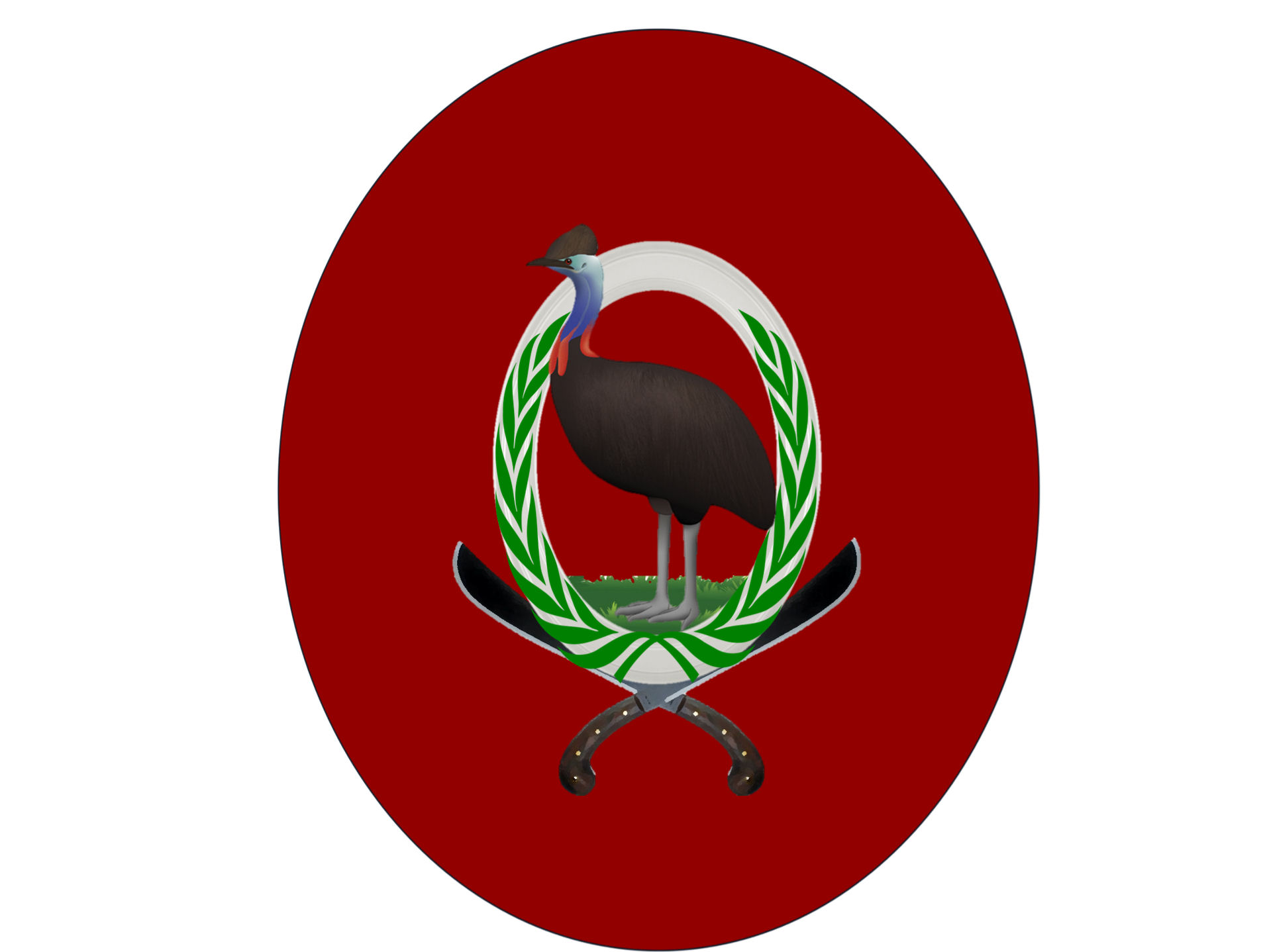
- PVK Coat of arms
- Founded: 21 February 1961
- Disbanded: 1963
- Service branches: Defense
- Headquarters: Hollandia

Leadership
- Colonel: W.A.van Heuven (Last)
- Minister of Colonies: Charles Welter (Last)

Personnel
- Conscription: No

The Papuan Volunteer Corps (PVK, Dutch: Papoea Vrijwilligers Korps) was a corps consisting entirely of Papuans, formed on February 21, 1961. It was established to contribute to the defense of Dutch New Guinea against the infiltration of the Indonesian Army during the West New Guinea dispute. The establishment of the corps by the Dutch Cabinet was approved in December 1959, and the corps was to serve as a semi-military police.

The PVK was composed of different peoples of Papua, mostly members of Arfak and Biak tribes and was under command of colonel of marines W.A. van Heuven. As an emblem the PVK chose the Cassowary (kasuaris in Dutch): the Corp's motto was Persevero (I persist). The PVK was armed and was equipped with a khaki uniform and a hat with the left edge upward, which was adorned with the PVK emblem and a plume.

In 1961–1962, the Indonesian threat greatly expanded. After the administration of the territory was passed to the United Nations (UNTEA) and the subsequent Indonesian government (1962–1963), the PVK was dissolved, and the members were dismissed. Some members later joined the Indonesian Army. Others, including Sergeant Awom Ferry, founded a guerrilla army, the Cassowary Battalion (OPM), and began a struggle in the Papua conflict for independence from Indonesia. Although later this movement would surrender and some of its members would also join the Indonesian Army after they were trained in Siliwangi and Diponegoro and combined with forces of Trikora, to form Kodam XVII/Cenderawasih. Others would join in the two competing factions of Free Papua Movement, primarily in 'Victoria Headquarters' rather than 'Defenders of Truth' as the former were led by former TNI member, M.L. Prawar and Seth Rumkorem.
