= West Papua rugby league team =

- Nickname: West Papua Warriors

First match
- West Papua 54 - 8 Philippines Developmental (5 February 2016)

The West Papua rugby league team, also known as the West Papua Warriors, is a rugby league team representing the secessionist region of West Papua, which is administered by Indonesia under its Papuan provinces.

Formed in Papua New Guinea, the team composes of players from both West Papua and Papua New Guinea and was formed to promote awareness on alleged human rights abuse of the Indonesian government in the West Papua region as well as the West Papuan secessionist movement.

The West Papua team made their international debut in a Rugby League International Federation-sanctioned match against the Philippine developmental national team. The Warriors won over the Philippines 54-8 in a match hosted in Sydney. The match was the first 13-a-side game for the Warriors.
