= Terianus Satto =

Indonesian insurgent in the West Papua independence movement

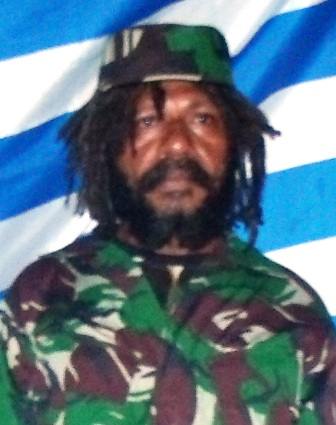
- Born: 9 January 1962 (age 64); Western New Guinea, UNTEA
- Military career
- Allegiance: Free Papua
- Service years: 1980–present
- Rank: Major General
- Conflicts: Papua conflict

Terianus Satto (born January 9, 1962) is the Chief of the General Staff of the West Papua National Liberation Army (TPNPB).

== Life ==
Starting in 1980, Terianus Satto fought for the independence of the West Papua region in Indonesia, together with Bernard Mawen. Satto and Mawen fought alongside each other for four and a half years. Terianus Satto also fought alongside Mathias Wenda, who fought as intelligence for 25 years until 2000

Subsequently, he joined Richard Yoweni from the year 2000 to 2010. He was elected commander of the battalion Moi. Shortly after that time he was appointed Deputy Commander Tabi, strengthening the military’s unity in Papua in 2012.

Satto persisted in the struggle for decades. He argued during the struggle for the Papua military dream of unity should occur. The dream was finally realized in 2012 with the TPNPB Summit. Eventually, he became one of the leaders of TPNPB. TPN was established in 1973 after the proclamation of independence of Papua on July 1, 1971, at the Headquarters Viktoria.

=== As TPNPB Chief of General Staff ===
Satto was appointed as Chief of General Staff (Kasum) through reformation TPNPB, Summit TPN-OPM which has been implemented in Biak from May 1 to May 5, 2012. He was appointed Chief of General Staff TPNPB with the rank of major general through an election.
