= Coat of arms of West Papua =

Coat of arms of the Republic of West Papua

The coat of arms of a proposed Republic of West Papua was adopted in 1971, when the proposed state was declared. The design on the shield was in the form of the flag of former Netherlands New Guinea, the Morning Star flag. The shield is supported by a Mambruk pigeon, who holds a drum in its dexter claw and a bundle of arrows in its sinister claw also, and surrounded by an arch in chief with the motto "One People, One Soul". The coat of arms is inspired by the frontispiece of a pamphlet entitled "De Papoea’s roepen Nederland" (English: "The Papua’s call for the Netherlands") published in 1951.

== See also ==
- Free Papua Movement
- Coat of arms of Netherlands New Guinea
