= Seth Rumkorem =

Seth Jafeth Rumkorem
- Born: 1933; Manduser, Biak, Dutch East Indies
- Died: 2010 (aged 76–77); Wageningen, Netherlands
- Relatives: Lukas Rumkorem (father)
- Military career
- Allegiance: Indonesia (?–1969); Free Papua (1969–2010)
- Rank: Brigadier General
- Commands: National Liberation Army
- Conflicts: Papua conflict: 1976 Jayapura operation

Seth Jafeth Rumkorem (1933 – 2010) was a West Papuan military officer and independence activist. He chose to defect from the Indonesian Army to the Free Papua Movement (OPM) after witnessing electoral fraud and human rights abuses conducted by the former. He quickly became the leader of the movement's armed wing and was among the signatories of the proclamation of the Republic of West Papua. He went into exile to Greece, after an attempt to secure weapons for OPM went wrong. He eventually relocated to the Netherlands, where he continued his activism until his death in 2010.

== Early life ==
Seth Jafeth Rumkorem was born in 1933 in Manduser village, eastern Biak, Dutch East Indies. His father Lukas Rumkorem was among the founders of the Indonesian Independence Party (PIM) in September 1945 and Tentara Tjendrawasih Tjadangan (TTT) in 1958, whose aim was to incorporate Netherlands New Guinea into Indonesia. The party was outlawed by Dutch colonial authorities and Lucas Rumkorem was arrested in 1958. While TTT smuggled important positions and locations in Papua to Indonesian Embassy in Singapore, Ambon, Serui, and Hollandia through the use of Papuan Tionghoa intermediaries and training for Operation Trikora. Following the signing of the transfer of West Papua to Indonesia, Lucas Rumkorem was awarded with an officer's commission in the Indonesian Navy. Seth likewise enthusiastically welcomed the Indonesians, after working for nine years as a bookkeeper for KLM Royal Dutch Airlines he applied to the Infantry Education Center in Bandung, West Java. He was accepted and graduated as an intelligence officer two years later with the rank of Sergeant. After being posted to the elite Diponegoro Division, he moved to Jakarta with his wife, Sylvania. His daughters, Yvonne and Yera, were later born in the city.

== Resistance activities ==
In late 1964, Rumkorem was arrested by military policemen for trying to prevent a government sponsored demonstration in support of the Act of Free Choice (PEPERA), on the other hand his father in a meeting with Sukarno on 16 October 1962 expressed Act of Free Choice (PEPERA) no longer necessary. He was jailed for three months and then put under house arrest until November 1965. In 1967, he was jailed for demanding that Indonesia take a clear stance on the referendum. He spent most of 1967 in jail before being expelled to Biak. Rumkorem soon became aware of the widespread use of torture, rape and extrajudicial executions of people associated with the Free Papua Movement (OPM), an organization campaigning for the independence of West Papua. In March 1969, Rumkorem was arrested by the Indonesian Navy for alleging fraud during preparations for the upcoming Act of Free Choice referendum. Rumkorem was imprisoned during the referendum, then placed under house arrest and then sent to Jayapura. Rumkorem went on to escape from captivity, fleeing to the border with the Territory of Papua where he founded the OPM affiliated National Liberation Army (TPN) guerilla group. TPN's ideology combined Papuan nationalism and Protestant Christianity. While mostly armed with traditional weapons and understrength, TPN was able to successfully carry hit and run attacks on the Indonesian army while disseminating its propaganda in urban areas.

TPN numbered some 19 permanent members, while many OPM activists visited its moving headquarters deep in the jungle to receive military and political training before returning to their villages. In mid 1971, Rumkorem was informed by a coded letter that a group of West Papuan independence activists based in the Netherlands led by Nicolaas Jouwe planned to form a provisional government in exile. Herman Womsiwor, a political opponent of Jouwe, urged Rumkorem to issue a proclamation of independence before Jouwe's group. On 1 July, Rumkorem's guerillas seized the Waris border post. Brigadier General Seth Rumkorem and Chairman of the Senate Jacob Prai signed the proclamation of the Republic of West Papua and transmitted it through the post's shortwave radio. The proclamation established a constitution, senate, army, national flag (Morning Star flag), state seal and anthem (Hai Tanahku Papua). OPM agents disseminated news of the proclamation all across West Papua, while army reprisals and government land seizures boosted recruitment.

In 1976, a rift emerged between Prai and Rumkorem, a combination of a personality clash between the two leaders and political disagreements. Rumkorem believed that TPN urgently needed weapons and favored requesting assistance from the Eastern Bloc, while Prai argued that such a move would be contrary to OPM's principles. Rumkorem on the other hand, accused Prai of working with unreliable allies such as Australia. Prai referred to Rumkorem as an "early traitor to the West Papua cause" due to his past affiliation with the Indonesian military. Prai departed the Victoria camp with the majority of its residents to Ubrub where he founded the Pemka faction and its military wing the Pepenal. Most of Rumkorem's supporters originated from his native Biak and Tanahmerah Bay. Rumkorem soon offered to serve as Prai's deputy but negotiations broke down when Prai founded a "De Facto Government" with Jouwe.

Indonesia seized the opportunity to launch a large scale offensive against OPM southwest of Jayapura. According to OPM estimates its losses in fighters and civilian supporters amounted to 1,605 killed. Overseas OPM activists claimed that its strength had been reduced to 3,000 to 5,000 fighters, while Indonesian officials believed it had been nearly wiped out. In early May 1977, Rumkorem was ambushed by Pepenal guerillas, but he managed to escape with the core of his group to Papua New Guinea. The Victoria and Pepenal factions continued a three way struggle with the Indonesians until 1984.

In May 1982, Rumkorem sailed from Vanimo to Vanuatu to obtain weapons, after receiving intelligence about a group of high ranking Vanuatuan politicians sympathetic to his cause. Unbeknownst to Rumkorem the head of his intelligence unit became an Indonesian agent, after being tortured and bribed by the latter. Rumkorem assigned his defense minister Richard Joweni as the temporary head of the movement and departed on a motorized canoe just as Papua New Guinea was about to be struck by a severe storm. Rumkorem's boat broke down in the middle of the ocean and he and his eight companions became stranded on Rabaul on 14 September. Rumkorem received shelter from a clergyman and fellow West Papuan refugee.

== Exile ==
Rumkorem eventually realized that he was betrayed and after receiving intelligence that the Indonesians were carefully monitoring all border crossings to capture him, he opted to continue his political struggle from abroad. In November 1983, Rumkorem was granted temporary asylum in Greece, he later immigrated to the Netherlands. Rumkorem's departure hampered OPM's struggle in West Papua as he was among the very few guerillas with formal military training. On 11 July 1985, Prai and Rumkorem met in Vanuatu, signing the Port Vila Declaration establishing peace and a unified military command. At the time Rumkorem claimed OPM's strength to be at 30,000 men with only 300 rifles between them, mostly weapons dating back to World War II. Rumkorem died in Wageningen in 2010 and was buried in The Hague.
