= Flag of West Papua =

Flag of West Papua may refer to:

- Flag of West Papua (province), designed by Pieter Mambor
- Flag of Republic of West Papua, the Morning Star flag
