= Mathias Wenda =

West Papuan activist (1920–2025)

- Born: 1920; Pyramid, Dutch East Indies
- Died: 12 April 2025 (aged 104); Vanimo, Papua New Guinea
- Military career
- Allegiance: Free Papua Movement
- Branch: West Papua Revolutionary Army
- Conflicts: Papua conflict

Mathias Wenda (1920 – 12 April 2025) was the Commander in Chief of the West Papua Revolutionary Army (WPRA). He was active in the West Papua independence movement from an early age in his village, Pyramid, West Papua. In 1977, he became the leader of the fight against the Indonesian occupation. He fled to Papua New Guinea upon the surrender of most of the villagers in 1980.

Wenda was appointed by Hendrik Jacob Prai as the operational commander during the operations by the PEMKA factions within the armed wing of the OPM after Prai's decision to separate from the Victoria (Marvic) faction.

Wenda died at the Vanimo Hospital in Vanimo, Papua New Guinea, on 12 April 2025, at the age of 104.

== See also ==
- West Papua Revolutionary Army
- Papua Conflict
