= 2021 Maybrat attack =

- Part of Papua conflict
- Maybrat Regency in Indonesian Papua
Date	2 September 2021
Location	Kisor, South Aifat District, Maybrat Regency, West Papua, Indonesia
Result	TPNPB victory

Belligerents
Indonesia	(Free Papua Movement) West Papua National Liberation Army

Units involved
Operation Nemangkawi; TNI; POLRI	Manfet Patem faction

Strength
12 (attack); 100–150 (pursuit)	30+

Casualties and losses
4 killed 2 wounded	14 arrested
- 5,200+ civilians internally displaced

The 2021 Maybrat attack was conducted by the separatist West Papua National Liberation Army (TPNPB) on 2 September 2021 in Kisor, Maybrat Regency, West Papua province. The attack, which killed four Indonesian Army personnel, was the deadliest TPNPB attack against Indonesian security forces in West Papua Province and marked a significant escalation of the Papua conflict in Maybrat.

== Background ==
Prior to the establishment of Southwest Papua as a separate province in 2023, Maybrat was one of the 13 regencies in the Indonesian province of West Papua. It was one of the only two landlocked regencies and is also the most remote regency in the province, with its closest point to the ocean (the Seram Sea) being 30 kilometres (18.6 miles) from the coast. With an HDI of 60.49, it is also the third-least developed regency in West Papua.

Prior to the 2021 attack, the province of West Papua was a relatively peaceful area within the context of the Papua conflict, with no recorded fatalities from TPNPB/OPM attacks since 2017.

As part of its strategy to root out the TPNPB, the Indonesian National Armed Forces (TNI) had been constructing new military infrastructure in West Papua, including in Maybrat. In March 2021, the Indonesian Army opened a new Kodim (regency-level military base) in Maybrat, while preparing the construction of district-level military posts (Posramil) across the Aifat region of Maybrat, which covers eight out of its 23 districts. Local students have raised their opposition to the construction of new military infrastructure in Maybrat from 2020 to no avail.

== Attack ==
At 3 a.m. on 2 September 2021, more than 30 TPNPB militants under the command of Manfet Patem (or Manfred Vatem), the chairman of the Kisor branch of the National Committee for West Papua, ambushed the posramil in Kisor Village, South Aifat District, Maybrat Regency. Using firearms and blades, they killed four TNI personnel: First Lieutenant Dirman, 2nd Sergeant Amrosius, Chief Private Dirham, and First Private Zul Ansari. Two other TNI personnel were severely wounded and five otherwise survived the engagement.

== Aftermath ==
Indonesian security forces immediately deployed 100-150 troops to catch the perpetrators of the attack. Later on the day of the attack, Indonesian security personnel arrested two individuals suspected to be members of Manfet Patem's group. However, Denny Mos, the commander of the Sorong Regional Defence Commando (Kodap) of the TPNPB, claimed that the arrested individuals were civilians and not TPNPB members. Over the 2021-2024 period, 14 people in total were arrested in relation to the attack in Kisor, and in 2022 six of them were sentenced to between 18 and 20 years in jail, out of the 21 people wanted by the Indonesian police.

The attack started a major refugee crisis in the area. 1,212 homes in fifty villages affected by the attack experienced varying degrees of damage, and by 2023, only 419 had received repairs. The National Commission on Human Rights estimated that around 5,200 civilians in Maybrat were forced to flee the area, and four districts (Far East Aifat, South-East Aifat, Middle-East Aifat, and East Aifat) remained deserted by August 2023. By October 2023, only 1,800 refugees had returned to their homes and 138 refugees had died in various locations outside of their home areas. As of January 2025, 600 refugees from Maybrat were still living in the provincial capital of Sorong.

== Reactions ==
The regents of West Papua issued a joint statement offering their condolences to the victims of the attack and supporting the Indonesian security forces to ensure security in the region. The National Commission on Human Rights condemned the attack and urged the Indonesian security forces to "deal with the perpetrators legally and firmly" while advocating for a dialogue to solve the issues in West Papua.
