= Egianus Kogoya =

Military commander of Free Papua Movement

- Born: 1999 (age 26–27); Mugi District, Jayawijaya Regency, Papua, Indonesia
- Military career
- Allegiance: Free Papua Movement
- Service years: 2017–present
- Conflicts: Papua conflict: Operation Cartenz's Peace; Nduga massacre; Nogolait shooting; Nduga hostage crisis

Egianus Kogoya (born 1999) is a military commander of the Free Papua Movement (OPM).

== Early life and education ==
Egianus was born in Mugi District in 1999. He is the son of TPNPB-OPM member, Silas Elimin Kogoya or Daniel Yudas Kogoya, who participated in Mapenduma hostage crisis. He studied his primary education in Mugi and later dropped out. After finishing his primary education, he went to Wamena in 2011 to continue high school. During high school, he was known for refusing to sing Indonesia Raya and salute the flag during the morning flag ceremony. This resulted in attention from the school teachers and he was often reprimanded.

== Free Papua Movement ==
Egianus was appointed as the Commander of Ndugama III Command on 16 October 2018. Egianus claimed that the group received weapons and ammunition from Indonesian National Armed Forces soldiers and police officers.

Egianus's first known attack was in December 2017, when his group killed Yovicko Sondakh, a Trans-Papua Highway worker in Mugi District. In 2018, Kogoya was responsible for the Kenyam Airport shooting, abducting teachers and medical personnel in Mapenduma, and Nduga massacre.

In February 2022, Egianus announced that his group underwent restructuring and expanded their area of operation to Intan Jaya Regency. In the aftermath of the OPM attack at the marine post in Kenyam on 26 March 2022, Indonesia wanted to have negotiations with Egianus Kogoya. Egianus, however, refused the dialogue offer. He claimed responsibility for the killing of 11 people in Nogolait, whom he accused of being spies. On 16 August 2022, he issued a statement to the Nduga Regional Government and TNI imploring them not to enter and develop Alguru since it was an OPM base.

On 7 February 2023, he ordered his group to attack a plane in Paro and kidnap the pilot, Philip Mehrtens and the Indonesian passengers (Demanus Gwijangge, Minda Gwijangge, Pelenus Gwijangge, Meita Gwijangge and an infant, Wetina W). The motive behind the pilot kidnap was that he wanted Papua to gain international attraction and became an independent state. He later released a video in May 2023. In the video, he threatened to execute the pilot if Indonesia still refuses to negotiate and demanded Indonesia and New Zealand have a dialogue on Papuan independence.

Egianus threatened to assassinate Edison Gwijangge, the acting regent of Nduga for visiting certain districts in Nduga by plane on 4 October. On 16 October, Egianus's faction and Elkius Kobak's faction killed seven miners and burned three excavators, two trucks, and miner camps in Seradala District, Yahukimo.

During the 2024 Nduga Regency election campaign, Egianus endorsed Edison Gwijangge's candidacy and asked army and police to provide assistance to him. Egianus freed Mehrtens on 21 September 2024. Sebby Sambom, the spokesman of TPNPB, claimed that a local politician bribed Egianus to release Mehrtens. However, he denied Sambom's allegation and claimed that he freed the pilot on humanitarian grounds. In an interview with BBC in October 2024, he threatened to kill all non-Papuan civilians as he believed that they were the main problem of the Papua conflict and expressed a desire to kidnap foreigners.

In June 2025, Egianus was discovered to own a weed plantation in Kurima District, Yahukimo Regency. It was believed that he traded marijuana for weapons.

In October 2025, Ipe Kogoya, Egianus's brother, was killed in Soanggama, Central Papua in a clash between TNI and the Intan Jaya faction led by his other brother, Undius Kogoya. On the 23rd, Undius was also announced dead due to sudden illness in Wandai, Intan Jaya.

== Bibliography ==
- Samah, Kristin (2019). Duka Dari Nduga. Jakarta: Gramedia Pustaka Utama. ISBN 9786020635606.
