= Kelly Kwalik =

West Papuan rebel (1955–2009)

- Born: 1955
- Died: December 16, 2009 (aged 53–54); Timika, Indonesia
- Military career
- Allegiance: Free Papua Movement
- Conflicts: Papua conflict: Mapenduma hostage crisis

Kelly Kwalik (1955 – December 16, 2009) was a senior separatist leader and military commander with the Free Papua Movement (OPM), a separatist organization based in Indonesia's Papua Province.

== Papua conflict ==
Kwalik, a known separatist, had been on Indonesia's most wanted list for years. Indonesian police had accused Kwalik of being responsible for a series of shooting incidents and attacks targeting the United States mining company, Freeport-McMoRan, which operates large copper and gold mines on Papua Province. In a 2009 meeting with the police, Kwalik repeatedly denied responsibility for the attacks.

=== Mapenduma hostage crisis ===
Kwalik's name gained international attention when on January 8, 1996, he and his militia held 26 members of Lorentz Expedition 95, consisting of both Indonesian and international citizens, which resulted in hostage crisis that lasted 5 months and the deaths of two of the hostages in Operation Mapenduma Hostage Liberation by Indonesian military special forces, Kopassus, led by commander Prabowo Subianto. This string of events also led to the 1996 Timika shooting incident in 1996 that killed 16 people on Timika Airport.

== Death ==
On December 16, 2009, Kwalik was shot in a police raid on one of his hideouts in the Gorong-Gorong neighborhood of Timika. Police claimed Kwalik was armed when he was shot while trying to flee. Kwalik died at a hospital in Timika.

Kwalik's body was laid in state at the Mimika Legislative Council building. His coffin was draped in a Morning Star flag but police rejected a request by Kwalik's family and supporters to fly the banned flag at his funeral. Kwalik's Catholic funeral mass was officiated by Bishop John Philip Saklil of the Roman Catholic Diocese of Timika. He was buried in Timika.

Following Kwalik's death, the Free Papua Movement (OPM) in January 2010 appointed Jeck Kemong as the new Supreme Commander of its military wing, the West Papua National Liberation Army (TPNPB) and regional commander of Nemangkawi.

According to Undius Kogoya, the leader of the OPM/TPNPB Intan Jaya faction, and Sebby Sambom, the spokesperson of OPM, after killing Joni Botak, the leader of the OPM/TPNPB Kalikopi faction, and Olem Uamang, his adjutant in 2023, both were Indonesian spies who were involved in the death of Kelly Kwalik.
