= Mapenduma hostage crisis =

- Part of the Papua conflict
Date	8 January – 15 May 1996
Location	Mapenduma District, Jayawijaya Regency, Irian Jaya, Indonesia 4.22572°S 138.194°E
Status	Indonesian victory; Hostages were released.

Belligerents
Indonesia	Republic of West Papua

Commanders and leaders
(Indonesia) Prabowo Subianto	Kelly Kwalik

Units involved
Indonesian National Armed Forces; Indonesian Army; Kopassus; Satgas Rajawali (Damal militia); Executive Outcomes	Free Papua Movement

Strength
100 commandos 3 helicopters	200 fighters

Casualties and losses
5 killed 1 helicopter crashed	8 killed 2 captured
- 2 hostages killed
- Location within Western New Guinea

The Mapenduma hostage crisis (Indonesian: Krisis Sandera Mapenduma) began on 8 January 1996 after the Free Papua Movement (OPM) took 26 members of a World Wildlife Fund research mission captive at Mapenduma, Jayawijaya in Irian Jaya (now Nduga Regency in Highland Papua), Indonesia. The hostages were subsequently moved to Geselama. The International Committee of the Red Cross acted as an intermediary between the OPM and the Indonesian authorities. Fifteen hostages, all of Indonesian nationality, were released relatively quickly, but eleven (comprising four Britons, two Dutch, and five Indonesians) remained in OPM hands. After lengthy negotiations, the ICRC secured an agreement for the release of the remaining hostages on May 8th. However, the OPM leader, Kelly Kwalik, backed out of the agreement on the day of the intended release. The ICRC removed itself from the negotiations and stated that the Indonesian Army was no longer bound by an agreement not to engage in combat with the hostage takers.

On 9 May Indonesian Army Special Forces (Kopassus) moved into the village but found it unoccupied. Five personnel were killed in a helicopter crash. A small observation force was left behind, and after this confirmed the OPM and their hostages had returned to the site on May 15th, a second assault was made. This was successful and effected the release of nine of the hostages, two being killed by their captors. Eight OPM fighters were killed and two were captured versus no loss on the Indonesian side, save for the helicopter crash. There was some international controversy over the use of an unmarked civilian helicopter by the Indonesian forces, which may have misled the OPM.

== Hostage-taking and negotiations ==
On 8 January 1996, 200 members of the Free Papua Movement (OPM) took 26 hostages from the village of Mapenduma in Irian Jaya. The hostages comprised 20 Indonesians, four Britons, and two Dutch – the latter including a pregnant woman – and all were part of a World Wildlife Fund mission conducting biodiversity research. Fifteen of the Indonesian hostages were released swiftly by the OPM leader Kelly Kwalik. On 14 January the OPM demanded the use of an aircraft and a meeting with four priests or missionaries.

The Catholic Bishop of Jayapura, Herman Ferdinandus Maria Münninghoff, made contact with Kwalik on 25 January to begin negotiations. Kwalik requested that the International Committee of the Red Cross (ICRC) act as an intermediary between the OPM and the Indonesian authorities. The ICRC consulted with the British, Dutch, and Indonesian governments before agreeing to take on this role.

A five-member negotiating team arrived in the area on 7 February but, owing to bad weather, dense jungle, and logistical problems, was unable to make contact with the hostage-takers until 25 February, when they were located at Geselama. The ICRC team were able to meet with a number of the hostages, under OPM supervision on this occasion and on their four subsequent visits (26–27 March, 17 April, 5 May, and 8 May).

The ICRC noted that there were serious concerns regarding the health of three of the hostages, including Martha Klein, the pregnant Dutchwoman, and attempted to provide vitamin supplements and a means of communication with the hostages' families. The Indonesian authorities made little progress with negotiations as Kwalik refused to back down from his demand for immediate independence for western New Guinea. However, the ICRC insisted that negotiations continue, and by early May had arranged the release of the hostages in exchange for free passage for the hostage-takers and medical and agricultural projects to be implemented in Irian Jaya.

A release ceremony was organised for 8 May at which many local tribal leaders were present. At the last moment, as the ICRC were preparing to leave with the hostages, Kwalik retracted his offer and again demanded independence for western New Guinea. The ICRC declared that as the OPM had backed out of the previous agreement, they would be unable to continue as an intermediary, that hostage-taking was prohibited by international law, and that the Indonesian forces would no longer be bound by their agreement to not engage in combat.

There was a dispute amongst the OPM with some members stating that the hostages would be released on 9 May. The ICRC representatives returned the next day to find that the hostages had been moved to a different location and that Kwalik refused to change his stance.

== Rescue operation ==
Indonesian Army Special Forces (Kopassus) for the rescue operation were under the command of Prabowo Subianto, son-in-law of President Soeharto. He arranged two Bell 412 helicopters to be shipped into the area via C-130 aircraft and used these, along with three other helicopters, to enter Geselama on 9 May. The rescue team found the village deserted and, leaving behind a Kopassus observation team, withdrew. During the withdrawal, a helicopter hit a tree and crashed, killing all five personnel on-board. Kopassus confirmed that the OPM and the hostages had returned to the village on 15 May.

Prabowo immediately launched another helicopter assault, code-named Operation Cenderawasih (Bird of Paradise). This operation resulted in the safe release of nine of the hostages, two of the Indonesian hostages having been killed during the course of the operation. Eight OPM fighters were killed and two captured. The May 15 operation was carried out by 100 Kopassus soldiers with access to an airborne surveillance drone and sniffer dogs. It was almost cancelled after the airbase from which it was to be launched was stormed by several thousand locals intent on burning the helicopters, who had to be repelled by rubber bullets.

Kopassus took several hours to carry out the rescue and were able to locate the OPM forces by following a trail of discarded personal belongings. The two hostages that were killed bled to death after being struck by machetes by the OPM; Klein was slightly wounded after being struck by a spear. The survivors were stranded on the mountainside overnight by bad weather before being evacuated to Gatot Soebroto Army Hospital. Three of the hostages were admitted to intensive care but the remainder were in relatively good condition.

Allegations were made regarding the ICRC's involvement in the incident, including that it co-operated with the Indonesian forces to organise the military operation and that it allowed the Indonesian forces to disguise themselves under the Red Cross emblem (particularly by using a red cross-marked helicopter). The ICRC investigated the matter and could not find any evidence of such events. The Indonesian Army admitted to using a white civilian helicopter (in Airfast Indonesia livery) to lead the assault, which had been used previously to ferry the ICRC representatives. They state that it was not marked with the red cross and was accompanied by two Aérospatiale SA 330 Puma in Indonesian Army markings. But they admit that it may have caused confusion to the OPM forces.

Several sources state that private military company Executive Outcomes provided training and operational advice to the Indonesian government on the rescue operation.
