= Goliath Tabuni =

Papuan Guerilla Leader

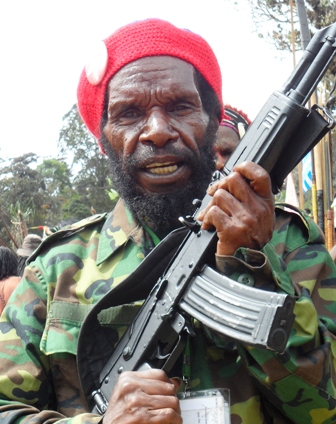
- Born: 1959 or 1960 (age 66–67); Gurage, Netherlands New Guinea
- Military career
- Allegiance: Free Papua Movement
- Unit: West Papua National Liberation Army
- Conflicts: Papua conflict

Goliath Namaan Tabuni (born 1959 or 1960) is a Papuan guerilla leader who is commander of the West Papua National Liberation Army (TPNPB). Mostly based around Puncak Jaya Regency, his unit is known for launching attacks and ambushes against Indonesian government units.

== Biography ==
Tabuni was born in 1959 or 1960 in Gurage, Netherlands New Guinea (today Puncak Jaya Regency). He reportedly joined the Free Papua Movement in the 1980s, after he was beaten up by Indonesian soldiers for a wrongful accusation. In the 1990s, he joined Kelly Kwalik's unit near the Grasberg mine, before splitting off and returning to Puncak Jaya in 2004, establishing his base in the district of Tingginambut. Since then, Puncak Jaya has been considered "the most violent" region in Papua. Between 2009 and 2015, at least 29 Indonesian police and military members have been killed in Puncak Jaya, due to ambushes by guerilla fighters led by Tabuni. Other TPNPB units in the regencies of Puncak, Paniai, and Mimika operate under Tabuni's command to an extent, although Tabuni's units have also come into conflict with a breakaway faction under Purom Wenda.

Partly due to his actions, he was appointed as the Supreme Commander of the West Papua National Liberation Army (TPNPB) in 2012 during a National Committee for West Papua conference in Biak. Due to his prominence as a guerilla leader, he also became involved in local politics – in 2006, a local politician approached him for support in a regional election against later Papua governor Lukas Enembe, and in 2009 Tabuni supported Golkar in exchange for his cousin Deerd Tabuni becoming a provincial legislator – and Deerd later even became the legislature's chairman.

In March 2015, there were media reports that Tabuni had surrendered to the Indonesian government, retracted shortly afterwards. Later reports claimed that he had retired from guerilla fighting and ran a wood business, a claim denied by a TPNPB spokesperson.

Tabuni has publicly announced that he would not support the United Liberation Movement for West Papua (ULMWP). He has also rejected regional autonomy for Papua, calling for full independence.
