= Coat of arms of Dutch New Guinea =

- Adopted: 1961
- Shield: Azure, six pallets Argent, on a chief Gules a Mullet of five points Argent
- Supporters: Two Birds of Paradise
- Motto: "Setia, Djudjur, Mesra" (Indonesian) "Loyal, Honest, Affectionate"

The coat of arms of Dutch New Guinea was one of a number of national symbols chosen by the Papuan representative body the New Guinea Council in 1961. The coat of arms was not however recorded in the National Committee October 1961 manifesto unlike the flag and anthem. The design on the shield incorporated the new Morning Star flag. The shield was supported by two lesser birds-of-paradise (Paradisaea minor) and surrounded by a garland of local flowers and a scroll bearing the motto "Setia, djudjur, Mesra" (Loyal, Honest, Affectionate).

== See also ==
- Free Papua Movement
- Morning Star flag
- Hai Tanahku Papua
- Coat of arms of the proposed Republic of West Papua
