= Republic of West Papua =

Proposed state consisting of the Western New Guinea region

Coordinates: 4.2667°S 136.1500°E

Republic of West Papua Republik Papua Barat
- Flag Coat of arms
- Motto: One People One Soul
- Anthem: Hai Tanahku Papua (Indonesian) (English: "Oh My Land Papua")
- The territory claimed by the Republic of West Papua, the entirety of present-day Indonesian Western New Guinea.
- Status: Unrecognized state (de facto)
- Capital: Hollandia (1949 - 1962); Jayapura (1962 - present)
- Common languages: Indonesian, Papuan Malay, and Papuan languages Dutch and English (in exile)
- Religion: Christianity, Animism, Islam
- Demonym: Papuan
- Government: Provisional government (Note: The Shefa Province of Vanuatu has recognised the Republic of West Papua as a legitimate government since 2021.)
  - President: Hon. Benny Wenda
  - Military Commander: Goliath Tabuni

Establishment
  - Netherlands New Guinea: 27 December 1949
  - Inauguration ceremony and Morning Star flag ceremony: 1 December 1961
  - Indonesia Military Aggression Against Netherlands New Guinea: 1 October 1962
  - United Nations administration in West Papua: 1 October 1962
  - Indonesian administration of West Papua: 1 May 1963
  - Act of Free Choice: 19 November 1969
  - Free Papua Movement proclaimed Independence: 1 July 1971
  - ULMWP Benny Wenda, Democratically-elected as President of West Papua Provisional Government: 17 August 2022

Area
  - Total: 413,000 km^{2} (159,000 sq mi)

Population
  - Estimate: 6,000,000
- Currency: Rupiah (IDR)
- Time zone: UTC+9 (WIT)
- Date format: DD/MM/YYYY
- Calling code: +62
- Internet TLD: .id
- Website; ULMWP

The Republic of West Papua (Indonesian: Republik Papua Barat), alternatively known as the Federal Republic of West Papua (Indonesian: Republik Federal Papua Barat, RFPB) is a proposed state consisting of the Western New Guinea region, which is currently part of Indonesia on the continent of Oceania. The region has been part of Indonesia since 1 May 1963 under several names in the following order, West Irian, Irian Jaya, and Papua. Today the region comprises six Indonesian provinces: Papua, Central Papua, Highland Papua, South Papua, West Papua, and Southwest Papua.

The self-determination rights of the West Papuan people are supported by Ghana, South Africa, Pacific Islands Forum countries, Solomon Islands and Vanuatu with the Parliament of Vanuatu passing the Wantok Blong Yumi Bill (Our Close Friends Bill) in 2010, officially declaring that Vanuatu's foreign policy is to support the achievement of the independence of West Papua. The parliament has proposed requesting that West Papua be granted observer status at the Melanesian Spearhead Group and Pacific Islands Forum.

The Republic of West Papua has been a member state of the Unrepresented Nations and Peoples Organization (UNPO) since the organization's founding in 1991.

== History ==
The region was previously mostly unclaimed, with the coastal regions and surrounding islands having a trading relationship with both the Sultanate of Tidore and the Sultanate of Ternate. Under the 1660 treaty between the Sultanate of Tidore and the Sultanate of Ternate which was under Dutch colony the Papuan people are recognized as subjects of Tidore sultanate. Under the 1872 treaty, the Sultanate of Tidore recognized Dutch control over its entire territory, which was used by the Kingdom of the Netherlands to establish West Papua as a formal colony part of the Dutch East Indies. For most of the colonial rule, there was no distinction made between Moluccans and Papuan. With parts of New Guinea is ruled administratively under Residentie Amboina. In 1922, Residentie Ternate was combined with Residentie Amboina and renamed Residentie Molukken. In 1935 the Residentie was renamed Gouvernement Molukken until the creation of Gouvernement Groote Oost in 1938, in which Gouvernement Molukken became residentie again. Under Dutch colonialism, West New Guinea is separated into two afdelingen, Afdeeling Nieuw-Guinea, and Afdeeling Zuid Nieuw-Guinea.

In 1949 after the Round Table conference, Netherlands kept part of its colony with the West New Guinea region known as Dutch New Guinea. The Dutch planned to settle most of its mixed population from Dutch East Indies in West New Guinea. When that plan failed, the Dutch had planned to withdraw by 1970 and began "Papuanization" to prepare for independence. In February 1961, the Dutch organised elections for the New Guinea Council a Papuan representative body to advise the Governor. The Council appointed a National Committee to prepare a political manifesto for the future state.

The Dutch continued the formation of a council on October 19, 1961 which drafted the Manifesto for Independence and Self-Government, the national flag (the Morning Star Flag), the national stamp, the birds of paradise coat of arms, motto and the name of Papua Barat (West Papua), chose "Hai Tanahku Papua" as the national anthem, and asked people to be recognized as Papuans. The Dutch recognized this flag and song on November 18, 1961 and these regulations came into force on December 1, 1961. The Dutch stated that they had accepted the Manifesto except for the denomination of the flag recognizing it as a territorial flag, not a national flag. On 1 December 1961, an inauguration ceremony was held for the Morning Star flag raised outside the Council building in the presence of the Governor, also the national anthem "Hai Tanahku Papua", the birds of paradise coat of arms, motto and the name of Papua Barat (West Papua) for the proposed new state.

On 1 July 1971, Brigadier General Seth Jafeth Rumkorem, a former member of Indonesian military cadet and son of an Indonesian military officer, defected and became the leader of the militant independence movement Free Papua Movement (Indonesian: Organisasi Papua Merdeka, (OPM)), proclaimed unilaterally West Papua as an independent democratic republic. The Morning Star flag was declared as a national flag.

On 14 December 1988, Thom Wainggai unilaterally proclaimed the Republic of West Melanesia using the Melanesian identity of the West Papuan people the name. The West Melanesia flag featured 14 stars with three colored bars of black, red and white.

On 19 October 2011, Forkorus Yaboisembut, the head of the West Papua National Authority (WPNA), proclaimed the Federal Republic of West Papua (Indonesian: Negara Republik Federal Papua Barat, (NRFPB)) with the Mambruk pigeon as the symbol of state.

In December 2014, all West Papuan independence movement groups were united under a single umbrella organization the United Liberation Movement for West Papua (ULMWP). The organization is chaired by Benny Wenda. In July 2019, the ULMWP claimed to have earlier in May united all West Papuan military factions under the one command forming the West Papua Army, including the West Papua National Liberation Army (TPNPB), that would be under "the political leadership of the ULMWP". The TPNPB released a statement in response denying that it had merged and called for a retraction and apology and said it had withdrawn from the ULMWP following a ULMWP summit in Vanuatu in 2017. On 1 December 2020, the ULMWP announced it was forming a provisional government for the Republic of West Papua with a provisional constitution and with Benny Wenda as interim president.

== See also ==
- Act of Free Choice
- New York Agreement
- Papua conflict
- United Nations Temporary Executive Authority
- West Papua Revolutionary Army
- Republic of South Maluku, a former unrecognised state in Indonesia
