= John Ondawame =

John Otto Ondawame (30 November 1953 – 4 September 2014) was an academic and activist of the West Papua independence movement. He was the head of West Papua People's Representative Office at Port Vila, Vanuatu, international spokesperson for the Free Papua Movement, and member of the Papua Presidium Council. He obtained his PhD degree in political science from the Australian National University in Canberra in 2000, MSc degree from the University of Western Sydney in 1995, Graduate Diplomas from the University of Sydney in 1994 and the Uppsala University in 1986, and Bachelor of Arts degree from the Cenderawasih University in 1976. He held Swedish nationality.

Ondawame carried out extensive peacemaking and public awareness campaigns in various countries, promoting a peaceful solution to the conflict in West Papua, and establishing solidarity links among oppressed, colonised and indigenous peoples.

He was a recipient of the 2001 Reconciliation Award bestowed by the Australians Against Execution group, and the 1972 President Suharto Award for Academic Excellence.

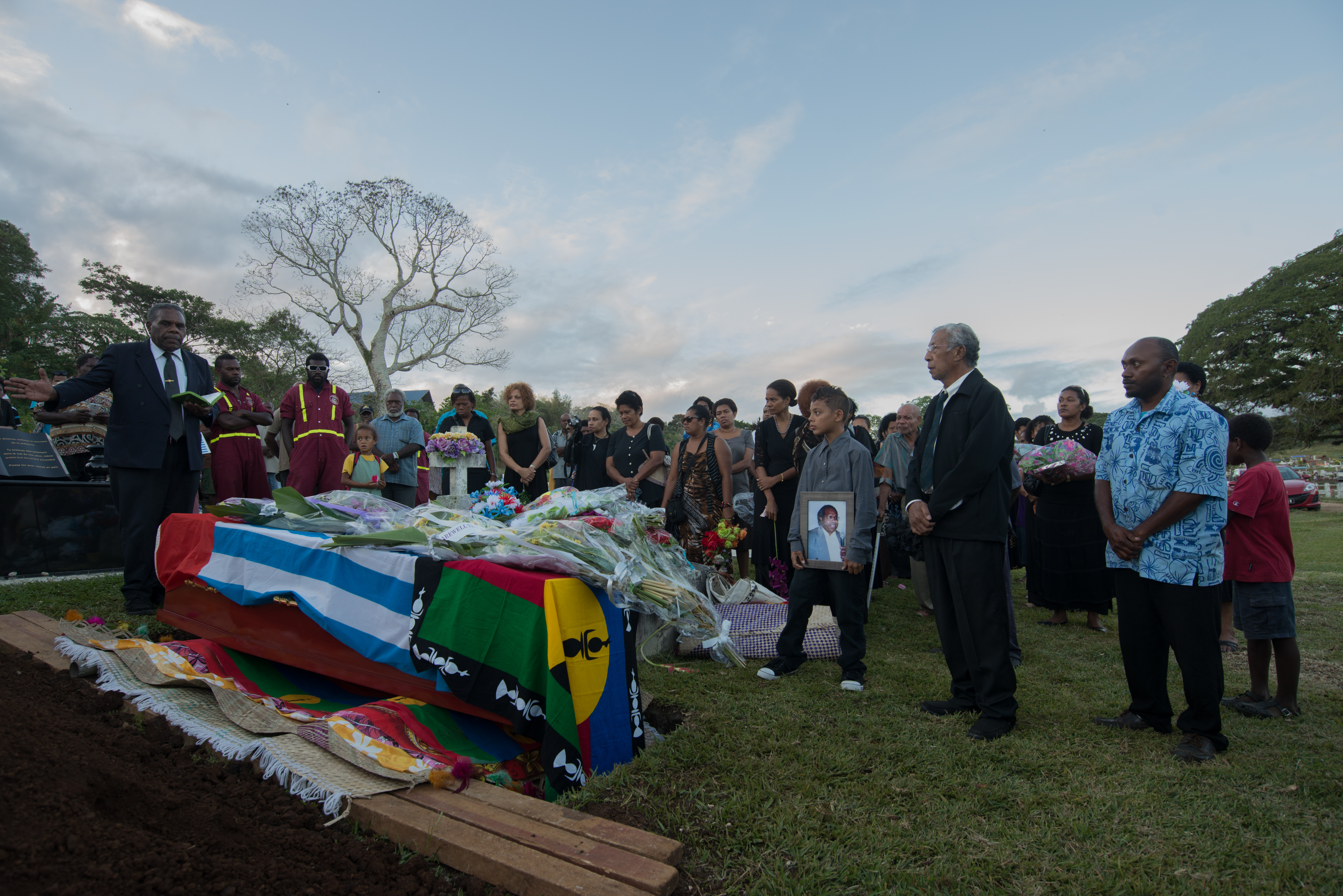
The funeral for John Ondawame in Port Vila (11 September 2014)

He died on 5 September 2014.

== Publications ==
- John Otto Ondawame. ’One people, one soul’: West Papuan nationalism and the Organisasi Papua Merdeka (OPM)/Free Papua Movement. PhD, RSPAS, ANU, c. 2000. Australian Dissertations on Asia, 1999-2002. Asian Studies Association of Australia, Inc., 2002.
- John Otto Ondawame. The Future of the Falkland Islands and Its People, in: L.L. Ivanov et al. The Future of the Falkland Islands and Its People. Sofia: Manfred Wörner Foundation, 2003. 96 pp. ISBN 954-91503-1-3 (Comparison between the self-determination in West Papua and the Falkland Islands.)
- John Otto Ondawame. Promoting the Collective Rights of Indigenous People to Self-Determination: The West Papua Case. Regional Round Table Conference on Education of Indigenous People of the Pacific. Suva, 4–7 December 2003.
- John Otto Ondawame. Self-Determination: Building a Better Future. Second International Conference on West Papua in Neuendettelsau, Germany, 12–17 October 2002.
- John Ondawame and Peter King. West Papua: Exploring the Prospects of Peace with Justice. Centre for Peace and Conflict at the University of Sydney. Position Paper No. 02, 1 September 2001.
- John Otto Ondawame. The Future of West Papua. Workshop on Autonomy and Democracy in the Asia Pacific region, ANU Darwin. March 2000.
- John Otto Ondawame. Self-Determination in West Papua (Irian Jaya)", published in Indigenous Affairs, No:1/2000, January–March of the International Working Group for Indigenous Affairs, Copenhagen, Denmark.
- John Otto Ondawame. Now East Timor, Next West Papua. Pacific Islands Monthly, Suva, 10 October 1999.
- John Otto Ondawame. Pengar, Makt, därför ockuperade Väst Papua (Money and Power, for this reason West Papua was occupied). Bulletin, Women’s International League for Peace and Freedom, Stockholm, 1985.
