= Amung =

Amung or Amungme may refer to:

- Amung people, a people of the Papua province of Indonesia
- Amung language, the language of the Amung people
