= Okto Dorinus Manik =

Indonesian Diplomat (born 1965)

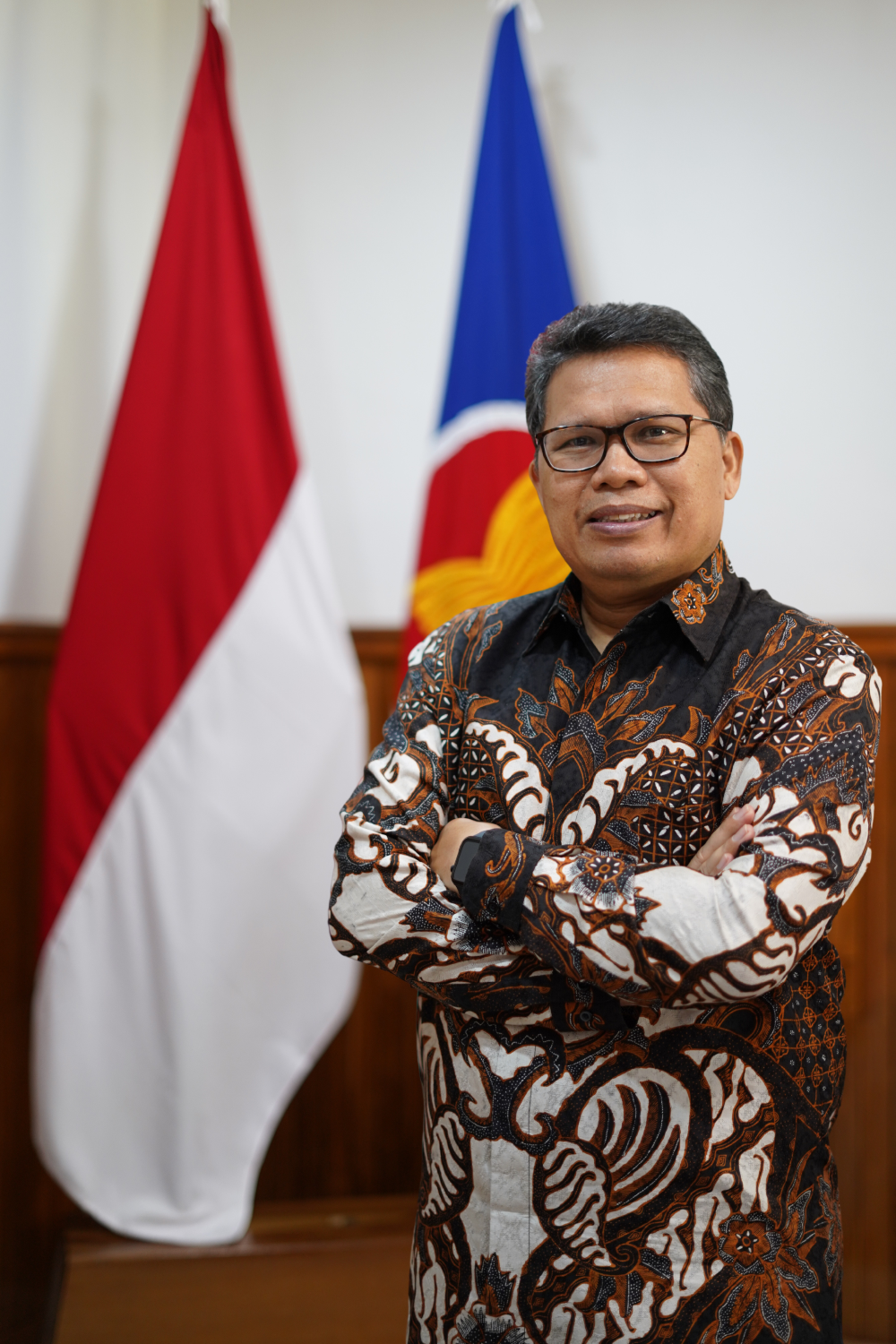

Ambassador of Indonesia to Papua New Guinea and Solomon Islands
- Incumbent
- Assumed office 19 December 2025
- President: Prabowo Subianto
- Preceded by: Andriana Supandi

Ambassador of Indonesia to Timor-Leste
- In office 17 November 2021 – March 2026
- President: Joko Widodo; Prabowo Subianto
- Preceded by: Sahat Sitorus
- Succeeded by: Nugroho Yuwono Aribhimo (CDA)

Personal details
- Born: 5 October 1965 (age 61) Simbolon, Padang Lawas, North Sumatra, Indonesia
- Spouse: Flantina Sari Mutiara Silalahi
- Children: 3
- Education: Padjadjaran University; Saitama University

Okto Dorinus Manik (born 5 October 1965) is an Indonesian diplomat who is currently serving as ambassador to Papua Nugini since 2025. Prior to his current ambassadorship, Okto was ambassador of Indonesia to Timor-Leste from 2021 to 2025.

== Early life ==
Born in Simbolon, Padang Lawas, North Sumatra, Indonesia on 5 October 1965, Okto studied international relations at the Padjadjaran University from 1984 to 1989, and in law from the same university from 1986 to 1991. He continued his studies abroad, completing a master of public policy from Saitama University between 1995 and 1997.

== Career ==
Manik's diplomatic career began in 1997 at the North American section within the directorate of international trade relations. From 1999 to 2002, he was assigned at the embassy in Wellington with the rank of third secretary, followed by a post at the embassy in Suva with the rank of second secretary from 2002 to 2004. In 2004, he served as the chief of the legislation subsection at the secretariat of the directorate general of multilateral cooperation. Subsequently, from 2004 to 2006, he was the chief of UN operational activities subsection in the directorate of development, economic and environmental affairs.

In 2007, Okto was posted as the chief of consular affairs at the consulate general in San Francisco with the rank of first secretary, serving until 2011. He returned to the foreign ministry to serve as the deputy director (chief of subdirectorate) for taxation and infrastructure facilities with the directorate of diplomatic facilities from 2011 to 2013, before being assigned to the protocol and consular section of the embassy in Washington D.C. with the rank of minister counsellor from 2013 to 2017. He then held the position of deputy director (chief of subdirectorate) for personnel and general affairs from 2017 to 2018 at the secretariat of the directorate general of law and international treaties.

=== Ambassador to Timor Leste ===
On 4 April 2018, Okto became the chief of the legal and administration for the ministry and representatives in the foreign ministry. In February 2021, Okto was nominated as ambassador of Indonesia to Timor-Leste. After passing the House of Representatives assessment in July, he was installed on 25 October 2021. He presented his credentials to President of Timor-Leste Francisco Guterres on 13 December 2021. During his tenure, he was involved in the Indonesia-Timor Leste business forum in 2022. He also facilitated visits to Indonesia by Timor-Leste president José Ramos-Horta in 2022, which was followed by the signing of a memorandum of understanding, and Prime Minister Xanana Gusmao in 2024. On 31 February 2023, Okto announced Indonesia's visa-free policy for citizens of Timor-Leste entering via land borders, which was enacted since the 13th of that month as part of efforts to strengthen bilateral relations between the two countries. Following his appointment as ambassador in Papua New Guinea, Okto announced his departure since August 2025, but it was not until March 2026 that he permanently departed Timor Leste for his new post. He was conferred the collar of the Order of Timor-Leste, Timor Leste's highest honour, by president José Ramos-Horta on 25 March 2026.

=== Ambassador to Papua New Guinea ===
Okto was nominated for ambassador to Papua New Guinea and Solomon Islands by President Prabowo Subianto in July 2025. His nomination was approved by the House of Representatives in a session on 8 July 2025. He was sworn in as ambassador to Papua New Guinea and Solomon Islands on 19 December 2025. He presented his credentials to Governor General of Papua New Guinea Bob Dadae on 19 May 2026 and Governor-General of Solomon Islands David Tiva Kapu on 12 August 2026.

== Personal life ==
Okto Dorinus Manik is married to Flantina Sari Mutiara Silalahi, and they have two sons and one daughter.
