= Morning Star flag =

Flag of Netherlands New Guinea and West Papua independence movement

- Proportion: 2:3
- Adopted: 1 December 1961
- Design: Thirteen blue and white alternating horizontal stripes with a red bar on the hoist side with a white five pointed star centered on it
- Designed by: Nicolaas Jouwe

The Morning Star flag (Indonesian: Bendera Bintang Fajar or Bendera Bintang Kejora, Dutch: Morgenstervlag) is a flag that was used in Netherlands New Guinea for official purposes in addition to the flag of the Netherlands. It was first raised on 1 December 1961. The territory came under the administration of the United Nations Temporary Executive Authority (UNTEA) on 1 October 1962, and was transferred to Indonesian control on 1 May 1963. The flag has come to represent the Republic of West Papua, a proposed country consisting of the Western New Guinea region, which since 1963 is administered as part of Indonesia.

The flag is used by the Free Papua Organization and other independence supporters. Under Papua's Special Autonomy Law, ratified in 2002, the flag may be raised in Western New Guinea (West Papua) region so long as the flag of Indonesia is raised higher than it at the same time.

== Design ==
The flag consists of a red vertical band along the hoist side, with a white five-pointed star in the center, and thirteen horizontal stripes, alternating blue and white, with seven blue stripes and six white ones. The seven blue stripes represent the seven customary territories of the region.

== History ==
The Koreri flag with the Morning Star and horizontal cross

During the Japanese occupation of Dutch New Guinea in World War II, the Koreri resistance movement utilised multiple flags: an inverted Dutch flag, to which a white star was added to the center of the blue band and a horizontal blue Christian cross on the white band, a 'peace flag' consisting of a white field and the prior flag's blue cross used in battle and as a Christian counterpart to the flag of Japan, as well as a 'crusade flag' with the Morning Star on one corner.

After territorial elections in February 1961, members of the New Guinea Council, a representative body consisting of 28 members, were sworn into office by Governor Dr. P.J. Platteel on 1 April 1961. The council's inauguration on 5 April 1961 was attended by representatives from Australia, France, the Netherlands, New Zealand, the United Kingdom and other Pacific Forum nations except the United States. The council appointed a National Committee to draft a manifesto expressing the desire for independence, and to design a flag and anthem commensurate with this desire. The design of the flag is credited to Nicolaas Jouwe. The full New Guinea Council endorsed these actions on 30 October 1961, and the first Morning Star flag was presented to Governor Platteel on 31 October 1961. The Dutch authorities did not accept the denomination of the flag, recognising it as a territorial flag (landsvlag) not a national flag.

The flag was officially adopted by decree of the governor of Netherlands New Guinea of 18 November 1961 No. 362, published in the Gouvernementsblad van Nederlands-Nieuw-Guinea 1961 No. 68.

An inauguration ceremony was held on 1 December 1961 with the flag officially raised for the first time outside the council's building in the presence of the governor together with the Dutch flag.

== Modern use ==
On 1 July 1971 at Markas Victoria (Victoria Headquarters) in West Papua, Brigadier General Seth Jafeth Rumkorem, leader of the militant independence movement Free Papua Movement (Indonesian: Organisasi Papua Merdeka; OPM), proclaimed unilaterally Papua Barat or West Papua as an independent democratic republic. The Morning Star flag was declared as a national flag.

The Morning Star is flown by Papua independence movements and supporters across the world. Ceremonies take place on 1 December of each year to commemorate its first flag raising in 1961.

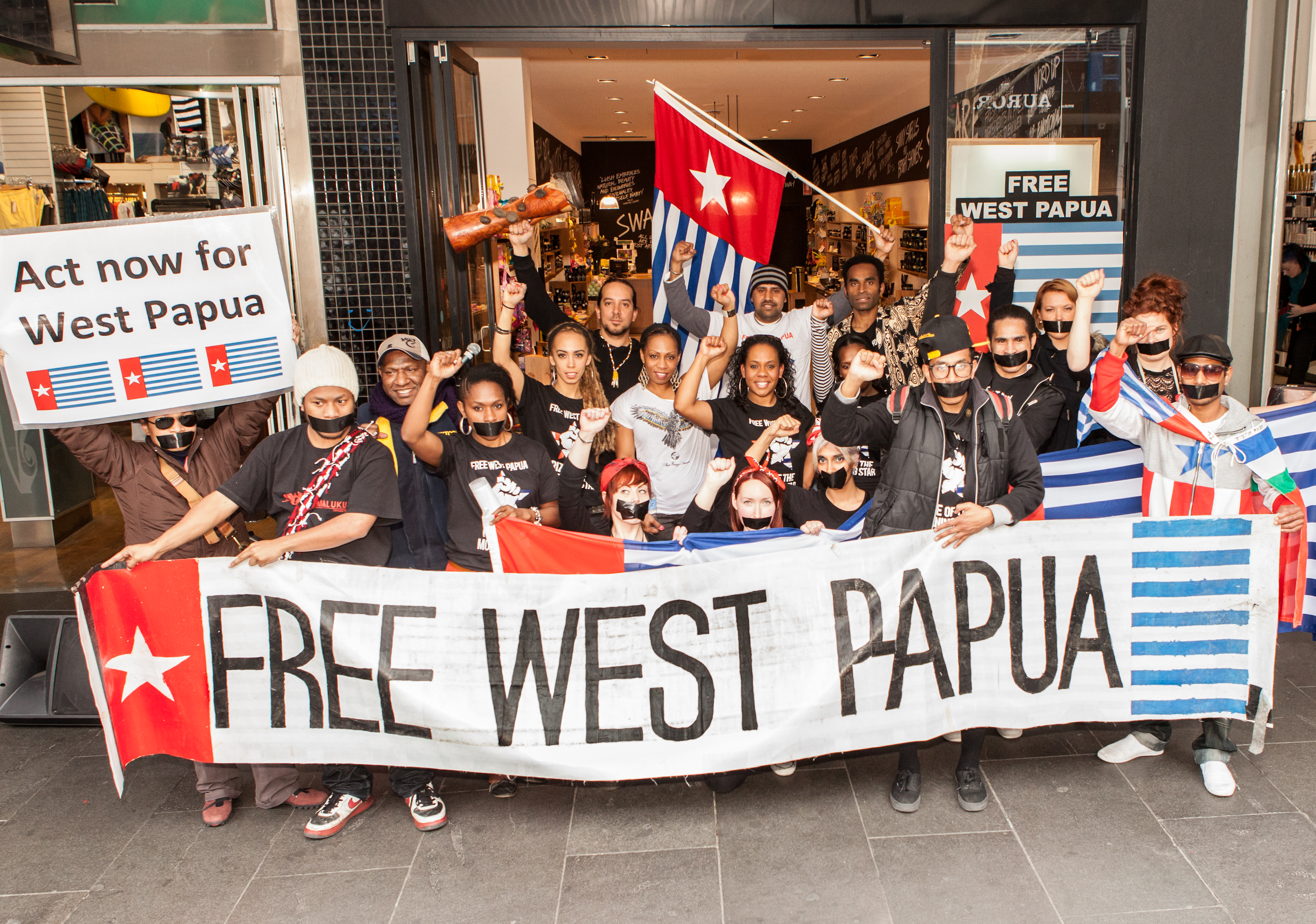
Free West Papua protest in Melbourne, August 2012

The flying of the Morning Star is seen by Indonesian authorities as a challenge to Indonesian sovereignty. Two Papuan men, Filep Karma and Yusak Pakage, were sentenced to 15- and 10-year sentences for raising the flag in Jayapura in 2004. Pakage was released in 2010, having served five years of his term. Karma was released in November 2015 and allegedly suffered abuse at the hands of prison authorities during his incarceration. Amnesty International considered both men prisoners of conscience and designated Karma's case a 2011 "priority case". During celebrations of Papuan Flag Day in 2019, an unknown number of people were arrested for planning or carrying out celebrations of Papuan Flag Day, with sources reporting numbers from 34 to over 100 arrested. Many local governments in Papua have banned any form of activity commemorating the anniversary.

== See also ==
- Free Papua Movement
- Coat of arms of Netherlands New Guinea
- Hai Tanahku Papua
- Coat of arms of the proposed Republic of West Papua
