= Hai Tanahku Papua =

National anthem

English: "Oh My Land Papua"
- anthem of Dutch New Guinea and Republic of West Papua
- Music: Izaak Samuel Kijne, 1930s
- Adopted: 18 November 1961; 64 years ago
- Relinquished: 1963 (Dutch New Guinea annexed by Indonesia)
- Preceded by: Wilhelmus

Audio sample
- "Hai Tanahku Papua" (instrumental): file; help

Hai Tanahku Papua ("Oh My Land Papua") was an anthem of Netherlands New Guinea and of the unilaterally declared Republic of West Papua.

== History ==
Introduction of national flag, national anthem and name of West Papua (November 10, 1961)

The anthem was composed by the Dutch missionary Rev. Izaak Samuel Kijne during the 1930s.

After the Dutch-supervised election of a regional parliament, the New Guinea Council (Dutch: Nieuw Guinea Raad), a group was formed on 19 October 1961 to elect a national committee. The committee drafted a manifesto for independence and self-government, a national flag (the Morning Star Flag), state seal, selected "Hai Tanahku Papua" as a national anthem, and called for the people to be known as Papuans. The New Guinea Council voted unanimously in favour of these proposals on 30 October 1961, and on 31 October 1961 presented the Morning Star flag and manifesto to Governor-General Pieter Johannes Platteel. The Dutch recognized the flag and anthem on 18 November 1961 (Government Gazettes of Dutch New Guinea No. 68 & 69), and these ordinances came into effect on 1 December 1961. The anthem went out of public use after Operation Trikora and handover of West Papua to Indonesia in 1963.

== Current status ==
The anthem is currently a prominent symbol of independence activists, including Organisasi Papua Merdeka (Free Papua Movement), and use of the anthem within the province is prohibited. The song has also been proposed as a symbol of the province of Papua.

== Lyrics ==
Lyrics to "Hai Tanahku Papua" in several languages
Old Indonesian Spelling

Hai tanahkoe Papoea,
Kaoe tanah lahirkoe,
Koe kasih akan dikaoe
sehingga adjalkoe.

Koekasih pasir poetih
Di pantaimoe senang
Di mana laoetan biroe
Berkilat dalam trang.

Koekasih goenoeng-goenoeng
Besar moelialah
Dan awan jang melajang
Keliling puntjaknja.

Kukasih dikaoe tanah
Jang dengan boeahmoe
Membajar keradjinan
Dan pekerdjaanku.

Koekasih boenji ombak
Jang poekoel pantaimoe
Njanjian jang selaloe
Senangkan hatikoe.

Koekasih hoetan-hoetan
Selimut tanahkoe
Koesuka mengembara
Di bawah naoengmoe.

Sjoekoer bagimoe, Toehan,
Kaoe brikan tanahkoe
Bri aku radjin djoega
Sampaikan maksud-Moe.

New Indonesian Spelling

Hai tanahku Papua,
Kau tanah lahirku,
Ku kasih akan dikau
sehingga ajalku.

Kukasih pasir putih
Di pantaimu senang
Di mana lautan biru
Berkilat dalam terang.

Kukasih gunung-gunung
Besar mulialah
Dan awan yang melayang
Keliling puncaknya.

Kukasih dikau tanah
Yang dengan buahmu
Membayar kerajinan
Dan pekerjaanku.

Kukasih bunyi ombak
Yang pukul pantaimu
Nyanyian yang selalu
Senangkan hatiku.

Kukasih hutan-hutan
Selimut tanahku
Kusuka mengembara
Di bawah naungmu.

Syukur bagimu, Tuhan,
Kau berikan tanahku
Beri aku rajin juga
Sampaikan maksudMu.

Dutch translation

O mijn land Papoea
Mijn geboorteland
Jou zal ik liefhebben
Tot mijn levenseinde

Ik hou van het witte zand
Van je fijne stranden
Waar de blauwe oceaan
Blinkt in het licht

Ik hou van de bergen
Groot en verheven
En de wolken die zweven
Om hun toppen

Ik hou van je grond
Die met je vruchten
Mijn ijver betaalt
En mijn werk

Ik hou van het geluid van de branding
Die op je stranden slaat
Een lied dat steeds
Mijn hart verheugt

Ik hou van de bossen
Het dekkleed van mijn land
Ik mag zo graag zwerven
Onder je schaduw

Dank zij u Heer
Gij hebt mij het land gegeven
Laat mij ook ijverig zijn
Om het te laten beantwoorden aan Uw doel

English translation

Oh Papua, my land
Where I was born and raised
Thee I shall always love
Till' my day of eternal rest comes

I love the whiteness of your sands
On your beaches, joyful
Where the azure seas
Sparkle bright in the day

Your high peaks I adore
Majestic and grand
Sublime clouds, surrounding
Around the tops, they do

I love this land of mine
Naturally abounding with bounty
That shall pay me off
and my labour in full

Thy roaring waves, I am smitten with
Ever crashing against your white, sandy beaches
A melody that shall eternally
In my heart remain

I love the sprawling forests
That this land is built upon
'Tis rapture to traipse
Under its benevolent shade

Thank you, oh Lord on high
This land of mine, Thine creation
Task me to labour ceaselessly too
To spread Thy cause, far and wide.

== See also ==
- Free Papua Movement
