= Jacob Prai =

Indonesian politician (1942–2022)

Jacob Hendrik Prai
- Born: 17 July 1942; Web, Keerom, Japanese-occupied Dutch East Indies
- Died: 26 May 2022 (aged 79); Stockholm, Sweden

Jacob Hendrik Prai (17 July 1942 – 26 May 2022) was the Head of the Senate of West Papua Provisional Government proclaimed in Great Waris, border area between Papua New Guinea and West Papua, Prai's homeland.
