= Free Papua Movement =

Separatist movement in Western New Guinea

- Organisasi Papua Merdeka
- Flag Coat of arms
- Dates active: 1 December 1963 – present
- Active regions: Western New Guinea
- Ideology: Papuan nationalism
- Conflicts: Papua Conflict

The Free Papua Movement or Free Papua Organisation (Indonesian: Organisasi Papua Merdeka, OPM) is a name given to a separatist movement that aims to separate Western New Guinea from Indonesia and establish an independent state in the region. The territory is currently divided into six Indonesian provinces of Central Papua, Highland Papua, Papua, South Papua, Southwest Papua, and West Papua, also formerly known as Papua, Irian Jaya and West Irian.

The movement consists of three elements: a disparate group of armed units each with limited territorial control with no single commander; several groups in the territory that conduct demonstrations and protests; and a small group of leaders based abroad that raise awareness of issues in the territory whilst striving for international support for independence.

Since its inception, the OPM has attempted diplomatic dialogue, conducted Morning Star flag-raising ceremonies, and undertaken militant actions as part of the Papua conflict. Supporters routinely display the Morning Star flag and other symbols of Papuan unity, such as the national anthem "Hai Tanahku Papua" and a national coat of arms, which had been adopted in the period 1961 until Indonesian administration began in May 1963 under the New York Agreement. Beginning in 2021, the movement is considered as a "Terrorist and Separatist Organisation" (Indonesian: Kelompok Teroris dan Separatis) in Indonesia, and its activities have incurred charges of treason and terrorism.

== History ==
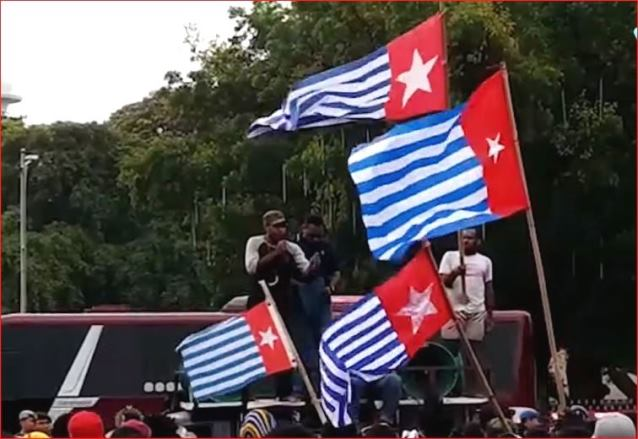
Bendera Bintang Kejora or Morgenstervlag (Morning Star flag)

During World War II, the Netherlands East Indies (later Indonesia) were guided by Sukarno to supply oil for the Japanese war effort and subsequently declared independence as the Republic of Indonesia on 17 August 1945. The Netherlands New Guinea (Western New Guinea, then a part of the Netherlands East Indies) and Australian-administered territories of Papua and the New Guinea mandate resisted Japanese control and were allies with the American and Australian forces during the Pacific War.

The pre-war relationship of the Netherlands and its New Guinea colony was replaced with the promotion of Papuan civil and other services until Indonesian administration began in 1963. Though there was agreement between Australia and the Netherlands by 1957 that it would be preferable for their territories to unite for independence, the lack of development in the Australian territories and the interests of the United States kept the two regions separate. The OPM was founded in December 1963, with the announcement that "We do not want modern life! We refuse any kinds of development: religious groups, aid agencies, and governmental organizations just Leave Us Alone! [sic]" Originally the group was a nonviolent spiritual movement based in cargoism and was led by Aser Demotekay, former head of Demta District. His policy of nonviolence and cooperation with Indonesian government, led to the creation of a more radical splinter group under Jacob Prai, former student of Demotekay.

Netherlands New Guinea held elections in January 1961 and a New Guinea Council was inaugurated in April 1961. However, in Washington, D.C. there was a desire for Indonesia to release CIA pilot Allen Pope, and there was a proposal for United Nations trusteeship of West New Guinea, Indonesian President Sukarno said he was willing 'to borrow the hand of the United Nations to transfer the territory to Indonesia', and the National Security Advisor McGeorge Bundy began to lobby U.S. President John F. Kennedy to get the administration of West New Guinea transferred to Indonesia. The resulting New York Agreement was drafted by Robert Kennedy and signed by the Netherlands and Indonesia before being approved subject to the Charter of the United Nations article 85 in General Assembly resolution 1752 on 21 September 1962.

Although the Netherlands had insisted the West New Guinea people be allowed self-determination in accord with the United Nations charter and General Assembly Resolution 1514 (XV) which was to be called the "Act of Free Choice"; the New York Agreement instead provided a seven year delay and gave the United Nations no authority to supervise the act. Separatist groups raise the West Papua Morning Star flag each year on 1 December, which they call "Papuan independence day". An Indonesian police officer speculated that people doing this could be charged with the crime of treason, which carries the penalty of imprisonment for seven to twenty years in Indonesia.

In October 1968, Nicolaas Jouwe, member of the New Guinea Council and of the National Committee elected by the Council in 1962, lobbied the United Nations claiming 30,000 Indonesian troops and thousands of Indonesian civil servants were repressing the Papuan population. According to US Ambassador Galbraith, the Indonesian Foreign Minister Adam Malik also believed the Indonesian military was the cause of problems in the territory and the number of troops should be reduced by at least one half. Ambassador Galbraith further described the OPM to "represent an amorphous mass of anti-Indonesia sentiment" and that "possibly 85 to 90 percent [of Papuans], are in sympathy with the Free Papua cause or at least intensely dislike Indonesians".

Indonesian Brigadier General Sarwo Edhie oversaw the design and conduct of the Act of Free Choice which took place from 14 July to 2 August 1969. The United Nations representative Ambassador Oritiz Sanz arrived on 22 August 1968 and made repeated requests for Indonesia to allow a one man, one vote system (a process known as a referendum or plebiscite) but these requests were refused on the grounds that such activity was not specified nor requested by the 1962 New York Agreement. One thousand and twenty five Papuan elders were selected from and instructed on the required procedure as specified by the article 1962 New York Agreement. The result was a consensus for integration into Indonesia.

=== Republic of West Papua Declaration ===
In response, Nicolaas Jouwe and two OPM commanders, Seth Jafeth Roemkorem and Jacob Hendrik Prai, planned to announce Papuan Independence in 1971. On 1 July 1971 Roemkorem and Prai declared a "Republic of West Papua", and drafted a constitution in 'Victoria Headquarters'.

Conflicts over strategy and suspicion between Roemkorem and Prai soon initiated a split of the OPM into two factions; Prai left in March 1976 and by December founded 'Defender of Truth', and TPN led by Roemkorem in 'Victoria Headquarters'. This greatly weakened OPM's ability as a centralized combat force. It remains widely used, however, invoked by both contemporary fighters and domestic and expatriate political activists.

== Activities ==
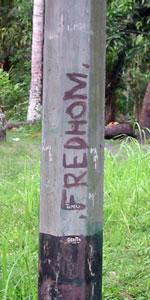
Free Papua Movement graffiti in Sentani, Papua: FREDHOM [sic]

=== 1970s ===
Starting from 1976, officials at mining company Freeport Indonesia received letters from the OPM threatening the company and demanding assistance in a planned uprising in the spring. The company refused to cooperate with OPM. From July until 7 September 1977, OPM insurgents carried out their threats against Freeport and cut slurry and fuel pipelines, slashed telephone and power cables, burned down a warehouse, and detonated explosives at various facilities. Freeport estimated the damage at $US123,871.23.

=== 1980s ===
In 1982 a OPM Revolutionary Council (OPMRC) was established, and under the chairmanship of Moses Werror the OPMRC has sought independence through a campaign of international diplomacy. OPMRC aims to obtain international recognition for West Papuan independence through international forums such as the United Nations, The Non-Aligned Movement of Nations, The South Pacific Forum and The Association of South East Asian Nations.

In 1984 OPM staged an attack on Jayapura, the provincial capital and a city dominated by non-Melanesian Indonesians. The attack was quickly repelled by the Indonesian military, who followed it with broader counter-insurgency activity. This triggered an exodus of Papuan refugees, apparently supported by the OPM, into camps across the border in Papua New Guinea.

On 14 February 1986, Freeport Indonesia received information that the OPM was again becoming active in their area, and that some of Freeport's employees were OPM members or sympathisers. On 18 February, a letter signed by a "Rebel General" warned that "On Wed. 19th, there will be some rain on Tembagapura". At around 22:00 that night several unidentified people cut Freeport's slurry and fuel pipelines by hacksaw, causing "a substantial loss of slurry, containing copper, silver and gold ores and diesel fuel." Additionally, the saboteurs set fire along the breaks in the fuel line, and shot at police that tried to approach the fires. On 14 April of that same year, OPM insurgents cut more pipelines, slashed electric wires, vandalised plumbing, and burned equipment tyres. Repair crews were attacked by OPM gunfire as they approached the sites of the damage, so Freeport requested police and military assistance.

=== 1990s ===
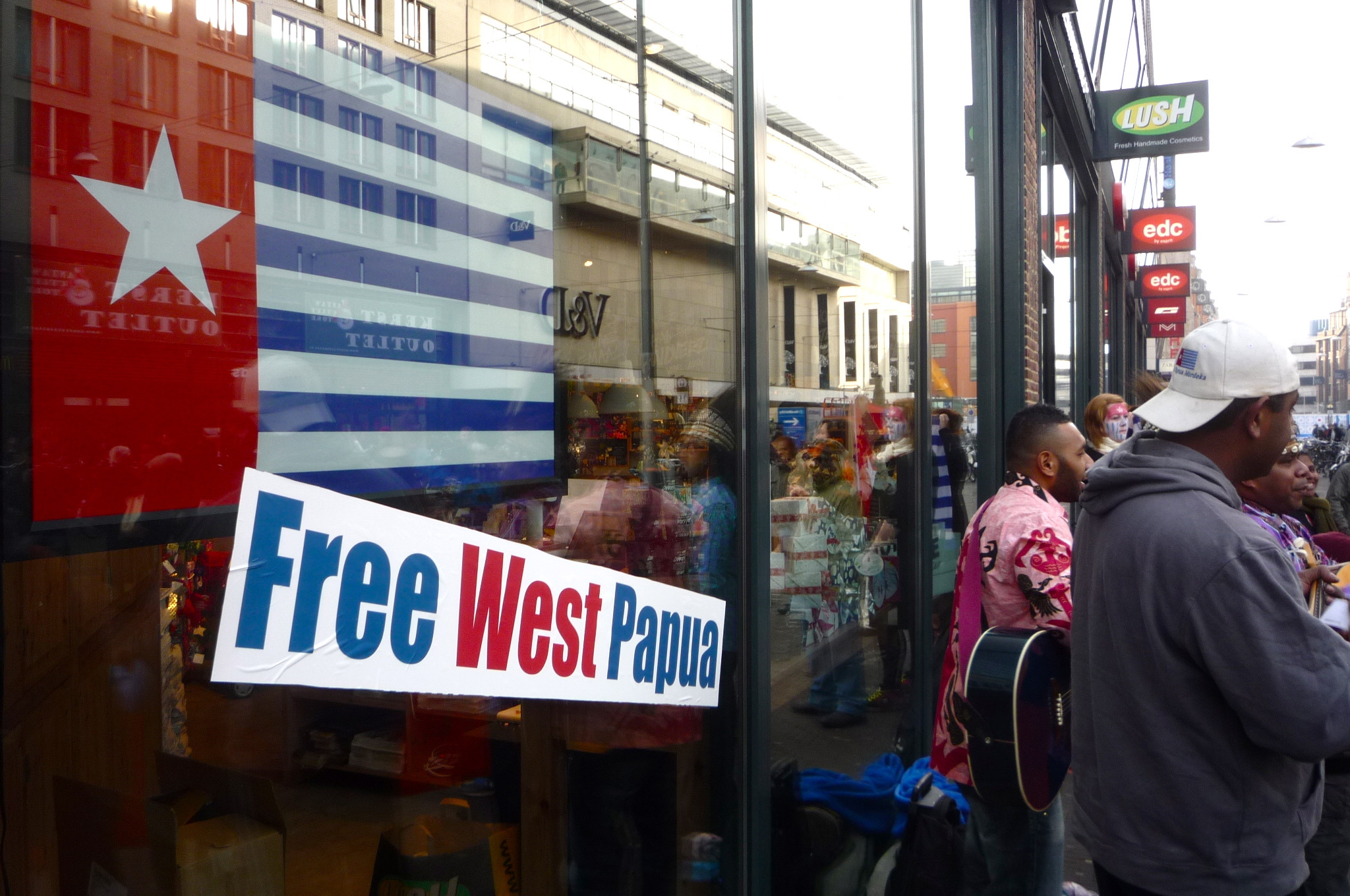
Free West Papua protest in Netherlands, 2008

In separate incidents in January and August 1996, OPM captured European and Indonesian hostages; first from a research group and later from a logging camp. Two hostages from the former group were killed and the rest were released..

In July 1998, the OPM raised their independence flag at the Kota Biak water tower on the island of Biak. They stayed there for the following few days before the Indonesian Military broke up the group. Filep Karma was among those arrested.

=== 2000–2019 ===
In 2009, an OPM command group led by Goliath Tabuni in Puncak Jaya Regency was featured on an undercover report about the West Papuan independence movement.

On 24 October 2011, Adj. Comr. Dominggus Oktavianus Awes, the Mulia Police chief, was shot by unknown assailants at Mulia Airport in Puncak Jaya regency. The National Police of Indonesia alleged that the perpetrators were members of the Free Papua Movement (OPM) separatist group. The series of attacks prompted deployments of more personnel to Papua.

On 21 January 2012, armed men, believed to be members of OPM, shot and killed a civilian who was running a roadside kiosk. He was a transmigrant from West Sumatra.

On 8 January 2012, OPM conducted an attack on a public bus which caused the death of three civilians and one member of an Indonesian security force. Four others were also injured.

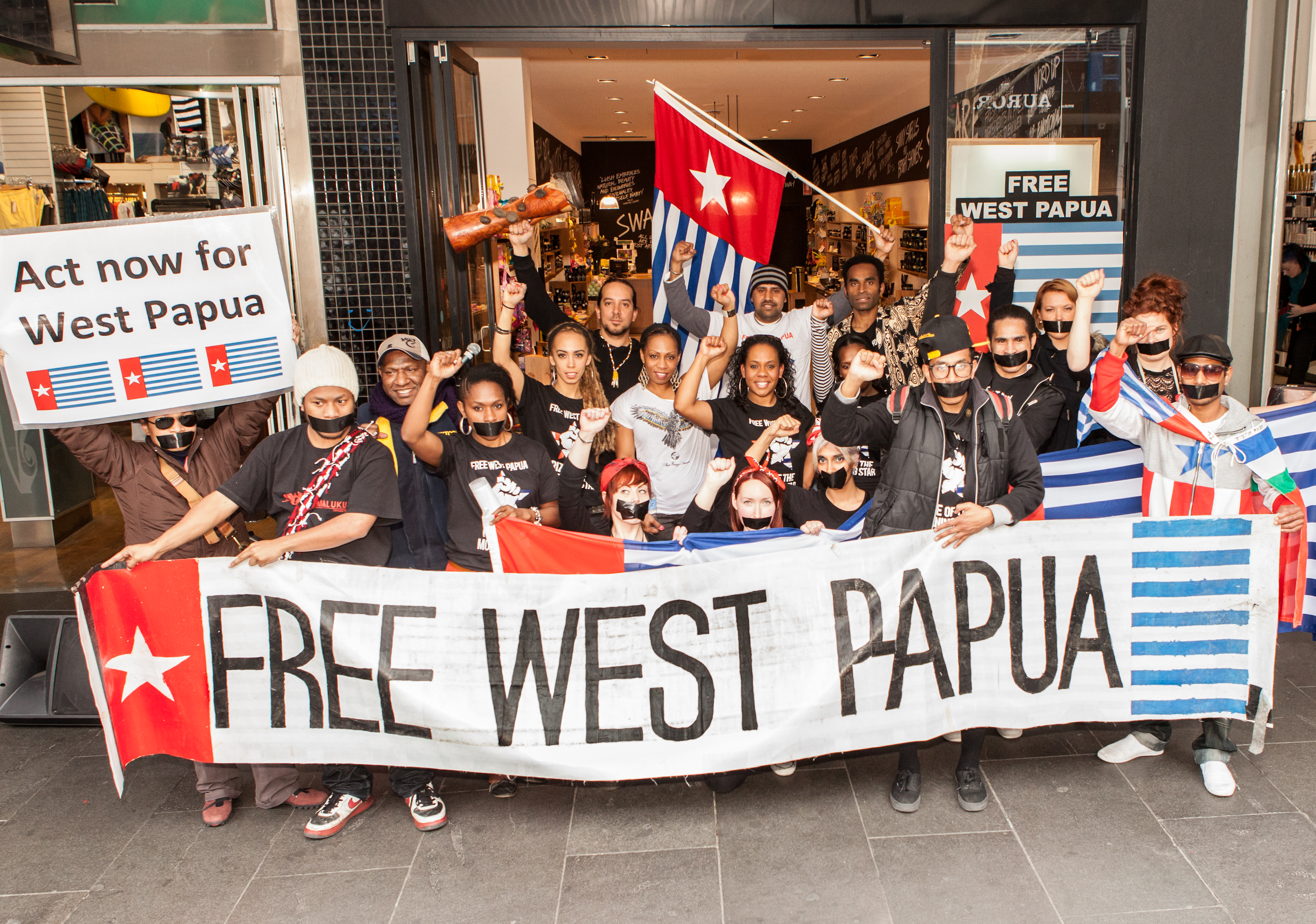
Free West Papua protest in Melbourne, August 2012

On 31 January 2012, an OPM member was caught carrying 1 kilogram (2.2 lb) of drugs on the Indonesian – Papua New Guinea Border. It was alleged that the drugs were intended to be sold in the city of Jayapura.

On 8 April 2012, Indonesian media sources alleged armed members of OPM carried out an attack on a civilian aircraft after it landed at Mulia Airport in Puncak Jaya, Papua. Viva, an Indonesian online news web portal, claimed five armed OPM militants opened fire on the moving plane, causing it to go out of control and crash into a building. Leiron Kogoya, 35, was a victim and former journalist for Papua Post. Kogoya was writing about local elections in Papua when he suffered a gunshot wound to the neck, dying at the scene. Amongst other victims were the pilot, co-pilot, both wounded by shrapnel; the passengers, a mother and housewife who was hurt by shrapnel on her right shoulder, and her four-year-old infant, also afflicted by shrapnel on his left hand. In response to these allegations, West Papuan Media Alerts, a news organisation created in reaction to the Indonesian media blackout of Papuan media, defended the OPM against these claims. West Papua asserted it was the Indonesian military who had attacked the plane, as a part of a false flag operation. West Papuan rights activist and former political prisoner Sebby Sambon was quoted as saying, "If it occurred near the TPN/OPM headquarters in Tingginambut, then accusations may make sense. TPN/OPM (is there) to fight for the people. Period. It is not possible to shoot people.” Sambon had frequent contact with Goliat Tabuni, the leader of the OPM troops at the time and said "TPN/OPM has made no orders to shoot civilian aircraft."

In December 2012, an Australian would-be mercenary, who was trained by a military/police security firm in Ukraine, was arrested in Australia for planning to train the OPM. He later pleaded guilty to training in the use of arms or explosives with the intention of committing an offence against the Crimes (Foreign Incursions and Recruitment) Act 1978.

On 26 April 2018, Polish OPM supporter Jakub Skrzypski was arrested in Wamena along with four Papuans who police claimed as being linked to "armed criminal groups" and was charged with treason. He was later sentenced to five years in prison, however wrote in a letter to news agency The Associated Press that his being charged and arrested was, "a purely political case, a trial staged for propaganda reasons."

On 1 December 2018, an armed group with ties to OPM kidnapped 25 civilian construction workers in Nduga regency, Papua. The following day, the group killed 19 of the workers and a soldier. One of construction workers had allegedly photographed the group raising the Morning Star flag at an independence celebration - considered illegal acts by Indonesian authorities. The construction workers were building a part of the Trans Papua highway that aims to connect remote communities in Papua. A few days after the incident, the OPM allegedly sent an open letter to Indonesian president Joko Widodo, demanding Papuan independence, rejecting central government infrastructure building projects, and demanding the right for foreign journalists and aid workers to enter Papua. In reprisals to obtain the massacred workers' bodies, the Indonesian military allegedly carried out airstrikes on at least four villages and used white phosphorus, a chemical weapon banned by numerous countries and international organizations. This was however denied by the Indonesian government.

=== 2019 Papuan protests ===
Fresh protests began on 19 August 2019 and mainly took place across Indonesian Papua in response to the arrests of 43 Papuan students in Surabaya, East Java for alleged disrespect of the Indonesian flag. Many of the protests involved thousands of participants, and some grew from local protests in Surabaya to demanding an independence referendum. In several locations, the protests turned into general riots, resulting in the destruction of government buildings in Wamena, Sorong and Jayapura. Clashes between protesters and counter-protesters and police resulted in injuries, with over 31 people killed from both the clashes and the rioting, mostly non-Papuan trapped when rioters burned houses.

In response to the rioting, the government of Indonesia implemented an internet blackout in the region. A Reuters reporter from the Jakarta bureau described the unrest as "Papua's most serious in years".

=== 2020–present ===
On 25 April 2021, Special Forces major-general I Gusti Putu Danny Karya Nugraha, head of the Papua intelligence agency, was killed when he was shot in the head while in an ambush in a heavily armed military convoy.

On 5 March 2022, Sebby Sambom, a TPNPB-OPM spokesperson, alongside Terianus Satto supported the 2022 Russian invasion of Ukraine, claiming alleged similarity of Ukrainian police and military treatment of the Russian minority as genocide with Indonesian police and military treatment of Papuans. TPNPB-OPM claimed Russian government support of pro-Russian separatists as justified, and claimed that both Indonesia and Ukraine are "capitalist puppets" of the United States.

On 7 February 2023, Papuan separatists attacked and set fire to a plane, after taking the pilot and five passengers hostage. The passengers were soon released. The New Zealander pilot, Philip Mehrtens, remained in captivity until 21 September 2024. The flight was operated by Indonesian airline Susi Air that operates flights in and out of Papua. The TPNPB has claimed responsibility for the kidnapping and attack, stating that they would be targeting all foreigners as a part of their campaign. On 15 February, photos of the pilot showed him to be in relatively good health and guarded by armed insurgents from the Papua movement. The group said that he would not be freed from captivity until authorities recognise the independence of the region. In June 2024, it was reported that the rebels wanted to free Mehrtens, but there had been "complications" including a failed rescue in April which left casualties on both sides. On 21 September 2024, Mehrtens was freed.

On 3 April 2023, four Indonesian soldiers died and another five suffered gunshot injuries in an attack led by Egianus Kogoya in Nduga, Papua.

On 11 February 2026, the pilot and co-pilot of a small commercial Smart Air plane were shot and killed during landing. Sambom claimed "the pilot was killed because this airline often carried Indonesian security forces throughout Papua". Another attack occurred on the same day that targeted a Freeport Indonesia convoy, killing a soldier and injuring a Freeport employee and an officer.

== Armed wing ==
The Free Papua Movement has many armed wings, namely:

- West Papua National Liberation Army

(Indonesian: Tentara Pembebasan Nasional Papua Barat; abbreviated TPNPB) led by Goliath Tabuni.

- West Papua Army

(Indonesian: Tentara Papua Barat; abbreviated WPA) led by Damianus Magai Yogi.

- West Papua Revolutionary Army

(Indonesian: Tentara Revolusioner Papua Barat; abbreviated TRWP) led by Mathias Wenda.

- West Papua National Army

(Indonesian: Tentara Nasional Papua Barat; abbreviated TNPB) led by Fernando Warobay.

== Organisational hierarchy and governing authority ==
The internal organisation of OPM is difficult to determine. In 1996 OPM's 'Supreme Commander' was Mathias Wenda. An OPM spokesperson in Sydney, John Otto Ondawame, says it has nine more or less independent commands. Australian freelance journalist Ben Bohane says it has seven independent commands. Tentara Nasional Indonesia (TNI), Indonesia's army, says the OPM has two main wings, the 'Victoria Headquarters' and 'Defenders of Truth'. The former is small, and was led by M L Prawar until he was shot dead in 1991. The latter is much larger and operates all over West Papua.

The larger organisation, or 'Defender of the Truth' or Pembela Kebenaran (henceforth PEMKA), was chaired by Jacob Prai, and Seth Roemkorem was the leader of Victoria Faction. During the killing of Prawar, Roemkorem was his commander.

Prior to this separation, TPN/OPM was one, under the leadership of Seth Roemkorem as the Commander of OPM, then the President of West Papua Provisional Government, while Jacob Prai as the Head of Senate. OPM reached its peak in organisation and management as it was structurally well organised. During this time, the Senegal Government recognised the presence of OPM and allowed OPM to open its embassy in Dakar, with Tanggahma as the ambassador.

Due to the rivalry, Roemkorem left his base and went to the Netherlands. During this time, Prai took over the leadership. John Otto Ondawame, who had left his law school in Jayapura because of being followed and threatened with death by the Indonesian ABRI day and night, became the right-hand man of Jacob Prai. It was Prai's initiative to establish OPM Regional Commanders. He appointed nine of them, most of whom were members of his own troops at the PEMKA headquarter, Skotiau, Vanimo-West Papua border.

Of those regional commanders, Mathias Wenda was the commander for region II (Jayapura – Wamena), Kelly Kwalik for Nemangkawi (Fakfak regency), Tadeus Yogi (Paniai Regency), and Bernardus Mawen for Maroke region. Tadeus Yogi died on 9 January 2009 suspected of poisoning, Kelly Kwalik was shot and killed on 16 December 2009, while Benard Mawen died in Kiunga hospital, PNG on 16 November 2018.

The armed military wing of TPNPB in Nduga, Papua is headed by Egianus Kogoya.

== See also ==
- United Liberation Movement for West Papua (ULMWP)
- Self-determination
- Mapenduma hostage crisis
