= West Papua National Liberation Army =

Armed wing of the Free Papua Organization

- Tentara Pembebasan Nasional Papua Barat
- Flag of the Free Papua Movement
- Leaders: Gen. Goliath Tabuni; Terianus Satto, Chief of General Staff
- Dates active: 1964 – present
- Ideology: Separatism: Papuan nationalism; Anti-Indonesian sentiment
- Size: c. 1,400 (Polri estimate)
- Part of: Free Papua Movement
- Wars: Papua conflict

The West Papua National Liberation Army (Indonesian: Tentara Pembebasan Nasional Papua Barat; abbreviated as TPNPB) is a Western New Guinean insurgent group in Indonesia. It is the armed wing of the Free Papua Movement.

It has been designated as a terrorist organization by the Indonesian Coordinating Ministry for Political, Legal, and Security Affairs. Indonesia has referred to the group as an "armed criminal group" and a "separatist terrorist group".

== Organization ==
TPNPB is a largely decentralized organization, with the head of the group being a largely titular rank. Individual groups are organized into Kodap (Komando Daerah Pertahanan) operating within the same area. According to OPM spokesperson Sebby Sambom, each Kodap needed a nominal membership of at least 2,500 to receive recognition from the organization's central command, but only required five firearms. Sambom claimed that there were 36 Kodap across West Papua in 2025.

== Leadership ==
In December 2012, the Free Papua Movement appointed Goliath Tabuni as the head of the TPNPB-OPM, Gabriel Melkizedek Awom as Lt. General, and Terianus Satto as the Chief of Staff.

The organization is distinct from the West Papua Revolutionary Army or West Papua Army (WPA) under Damianus Magai Yogi, affiliated with United Liberation Movement for West Papua and Benny Wenda.

== Tactics and equipment ==
The TPNPB employs guerilla tactics to attack and destroy industrial buildings as a rejection of Indonesian-led development. In their attacks, they use machetes, bows and arrows, axes, and limited numbers of revolvers and rifles, however the number of rifles have increased since the 2020s. TPNPB sources their rifles through capturing the equipment of killed Indonesian soldiers, illicit purchasing from active soldiers, and smuggling from either abroad (Philippines and Papua New Guinea) or from Java.

Between 2018 and 2021, the Jakarta-based Institute for Policy Analysis of Conflict estimated as a "best guess" that 34 TPNPB fighters and 52 Indonesian government soldiers have been killed in 183 clashes.

== Actions ==
=== 2018 Nduga massacre ===
On 1 December 2018, the TPNPB shot at construction workers, which the TPNPB believed them as military personnel disguised in civilian attire in the Nduga Regency, Papua (now in Highland Papua), Indonesia. The TPNPB declared responsibility for the attack, in which at least twenty-four Indonesian construction workers were killed and which the Indonesian government labeled "the Nduga massacre" (Indonesian: Pembantaian Nduga).

=== 2022 Nogolait shooting ===
On 16 July 2022, a group of around twenty TPNPB gunmen entered the Kampung Nonggolait (or Nogolait) in Nduga Regency, Highland Papua, Indonesia. The attackers opened fire on a grocer, and then shot seven other traders who were riding on a freight truck. Four bystanders were also shot. On many occasions, rebel spokesman Sebby Sambom has said the group's fighters had warned civilians to leave areas the rebels consider a "war zone". He also urged workers to leave all Indonesian government projects, or they would be considered part of the security forces. Indonesian authorities stated that the Free Papua Movement's military wing was responsible for the shooting, and specifically the Tabuni and Egianus Kogoya group.

=== 2023 Oksibil attacks ===
From 7 January until 12 January 2023, the TPNPB periodically attacked Oksibil, the seat of the Bintang Mountains Regency, in Highland Papua. According to the Regional Police of Papua, Bintang Mountains is one of seven regencies that are vulnerable to separatist attacks.

=== 2023 hostage taking ===
In February 2023, the TPNPB captured pilot Philip Mehrtens, who was employed by the Indonesian private charter airline company Susi Air and had landed his plane at the Paro Airport in the remote highlands of the Nduga regency of West Papua. Military authorities stated they had begun a search for the pilot and identified his approximate location when they were ambushed by the West Papua Liberation Army. At least six soldiers died, and twenty-one others fled into the jungle, according to military reports seen by journalists. The TPNB claimed they killed thirteen Indonesian soldiers. The military authorities stated that one Indonesian soldier was killed, from a fall "into a deep ravine". In April 2023, the TPNPB issued a call to the New Zealand government for a negotiation about the pilot's release. They stated that New Zealand and the United Nations have an "obligation to urge the Indonesian Government to stop military operations" against them. On 20 August 2024, Mehrtens was released after nearly 600 days in captivity.

== Presence ==
Prior to 2018, TPNPB actions were largely limited to the regencies (kabupaten) of Puncak Jaya, Lanny Jaya, and Mimika. However, in the early 2020s the group expanded to other neighboring regencies, taking control of an airstrip at Ilaga for some time. Indonesian think-tank Institute for Policy Analysis of Conflict described districts in highland Papua as under the control of TPNPB, e.g. six districts in Lanny Jaya in 2018 was described as being controlled by local TPNPB leader Purom Wenda.

On 22 October 2024, the 7th Merauke Battalion under the leadership of Jepchon Gepjae, consisting of 543 personnel, declared their loyalty to Purom Wenda from 5th Lanny Jaya Regional Defense Command (Kodap V Lanny Jaya) as the supreme commander and will control the Merauke region. In addition, they also stated that they recognized Simon P. Sapioper as president of the National Government of the Republic of West Papua (NGRWP).

== See also ==
- West Papua Revolutionary Army
