= List of Amnesty International-designated prisoners of conscience =

Below is an incomplete list of individuals that Amnesty International has considered to be prisoners of conscience, organized by country.

== Australia ==
- Albert Langer

== Azerbaijan ==
- Ilgar Mammadov, Republican Alternative Movement
- Anar Bayramli
- Ramin Bayramov
- Arif Yunus
- Leyla Yunus
- Vidadi Isgandarov
- Taleh Khasmammadov and youth activists Bakhtiyar Guliyev, Mahammad Azizov, Shahin Novruzlu, Rashad Hasanov
- Rashadat Akhundov, Zaur Gurbanli, Uzeyir Mammadli and Ilkin Rustamzade

== Bahrain ==
- Mahdi Abu Deeb
- Mohammad Sanad al-Makina and the Bahrain Thirteen
- Abdulhadi al-Khawaja
- Hassan Mushaima
- Abdelwahab Hussain
- Abdel-Jalil al-Singace
- Nabeel Rajab
- Ebrahim Sharif
- Salah Abdullah Hubail al-Khawaja

== Bangladesh ==
- Khaleda Zia

== Belarus ==
- Viktar Babaryka
- Ales Bialiatski
- Maria Kalesnikava
- Iryna Khalip
- Eduard Lobau
- Ihar Losik
- Uladzimir Niaklajeu
- Marfa Rabkova
- Pavel Sevyarynets
- Mikola Statkevich
- Anton Suryapin
- Siarhei Tsikhanouski

== Canada ==
- Chief Dsta’hyl

== China ==
- Chen Wei
- Dhondup Wangchen
- Ershidin Israil
- Gao Zhisheng
- Guo Feixiong
- Guo Xiaojun
- Mao Hengfeng
- Shi Tao
- Wang Junling
- Wang Xiaodong

== El Salvador ==
- Ruth Eleonora López
- Alejandro Henríquez
- José Ángel Pérez

== Eritrea ==
- Aster Fissehatsion
- Ogbe Abraha
- Hamid Himid
- Saleh Idris Kekya
- Estifanos Seyoum
- Berhane Ghebrezgabiher
- Germano Nati
- Beraki Gebreselassie
- Mahmoud Ahmed Sheriffo
- Petros Solomon
- Haile Woldetensae
- Dawit Isaak

== Ethiopia ==
- Eskinder Nega
- Reeyot Alemu
- Andualem Aragie
- Habtamu Ayalew
- Asrat Woldeyes
- Daniel Bekele
- Serkalem Fasil
- Zone 9 bloggers
- Bekele Gerba

== Guatemala ==
- Bernardo Caal Xol
- Virginia Laparra

== Hong Kong ==
- Alex Chow
- Nathan Law
- Joshua Wong

== India ==
- Binayak Sen
- Soni Sori
- Irom Sharmila Chanu
- Anand Teltumbde
- Sayed Ali Shah Geelani
- Maqbool Bhat
- Mirwais Umar Farooq

== Indonesia ==
- Alexander Aan
- Buchtar Tabuni
- Dita Indah Sari
- Filep Karma
- Johan Teterissa
- Soemarso Soemarsono
- Sri Koesnapsijah
- Tajul Muluk
- Yusak Pakage

== Israel ==
- Mordechai Vanunu

== Iran ==
- Bahman Ahmadi Amou'i
- Zhila Bani-Yaghoub
- Arzhang Davoodi
- Ghoncheh Ghavami
- Kouhyar Goudarzi
- Zeynab Jalaliyan
- Mohammad Sadigh Kabudvand
- Zhila Karamzadeh-Makvandi
- Habibollah Latifi
- Hossein Ronaghi Maleki
- Narges Mohammadi
- Parvin Mokhtareh
- Abdollah Momeni
- Sayed Ziaoddin (Zia) Nabavi
- Mansour Osanlou
- Jafar Panahi
- Isa Saharkhiz
- Mohammad Seifzadeh
- Reza Shahabi
- Saeed Shirzad
- Abdolfattah Soltani
- Heshmat Tabarzadi
- Majid Tavakoli
- Mohammad Ali Taheri
- Ahmad Reza Djalali

== Kuwait ==
- Hamad al-Naqi

== Kyrgyzstan ==
- Azimzhan Askarov
- Makhabat Tazhibek Kyzy

== Malaysia ==
- Ali Abd Jalil
- Anwar Ibrahim

== Mauritania ==
- Mohamed Cheikh Ould Mkhaitir

== Mexico ==
- José Francisco Gallardo Rodríguez

== Morocco ==
- Ali Anouzla

== Myanmar ==
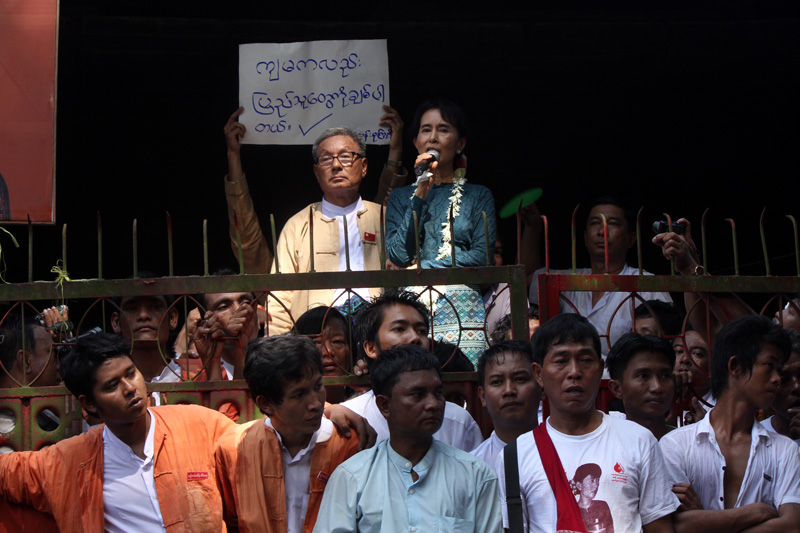
Aung San Suu Kyi was an Amnesty International-recognized prisoner of conscience from 1989 to 1995, from 2000 to 2002, and from 2003 to 2010.

- Phyo Phyo Aung
- Hkun Htun Oo

== Nigeria ==
- Fela Kuti
- Omoyele Sowore
- Olawale Bakare
- Agba Jalingo

== North Korea ==
- Oh Hae-won

== North Macedonia ==
- Jovan Vraniškovski

== Pakistan ==
- Junaid Hafeez
- Asghar Khan
- Abdul Ghaffar Khan
- Mian Ghulam Jilani

== Philippines ==
- Leila de Lima

== Russia ==
Name	Age	Location	Term	Until	Reason
Alexei Navalny	45	IK-6 Penal Colony	9 years	06-08-2031	Political activism
Vladimir Kara-Murza	41	Corrective colony No. 2, Vladimir Oblast	25 years	17-04-2048	Political activism
Christensen, Dennis	45	Detention Center No. 1, Oryol Region	17 months	2018-11-01	Religious activity
Karimov, Ilkham	37	Detention Center No. 5, Republic of Tatarstan	5 months	2018-10-25	Religious activity
Matrashov, Konstantin	29	Detention Center No. 5, Republic of Tatarstan	5 months	2018-10-25	Religious activity
Myakushin, Vladimir	30	Detention Center No. 5, Republic of Tatarstan	5 months	2018-10-25	Religious activity
Yulmetyev, Aydar	24	Detention Center No. 5, Republic of Tatarstan	5 months	2018-10-25	Religious activity
Mikhailov, Dmitriy	40	Detention Center No. 1, Ivanovo Region	5 months	2018-10-19	Religious activity
Klimov, Sergey	48	Detention Center No. 1, Tomsk Region	5 months	2018-10-31	Religious activity
Osadchuk, Valentin	42	Detention Center No. 1, Primorskiy Territory	7 months	2018-11-20	Religious activity
Bazhenov, Konstantin	43	Detention Center No. 1, Saratov Region	6 months	2018-12-12	Religious activity
Makhammadiev, Felix	33	Detention Center No. 1, Saratov Region	6 months	2018-12-12	Religious activity
Budenchuk, Aleksey	35	Detention Center No. 1, Saratov Region	6 months	2018-12-12	Religious activity
Stupnikov, Andrey	44	Detention Center No. 1, Krasnoyarsk Territory	4 months	2018-11-02	Religious activity
Polyakova, Anastasiya	34	Detention Center No. 1, Omsk Region	5 months	2018-11-20	Religious activity
Polyakov, Sergey	46	Detention Center No. 1, Omsk Region	5 months	2018-11-20	Religious activity
Alushkin, Vladimir	54	Detention Center No. 1, Penza Region	4 months	2018-11-14	Religious activity
Levchuk, Vadim	46	Detention Center No. 1, Kemerovo Region	4 months	2018-11-19	Religious activity
Britvin, Sergey	52	Detention Center No. 1, Kemerovo Region	4 months	2018-11-19	Religious activity
Barmakin, Dmitriy	44	Detention Center No. 1, Primorskiy Territory	4 months	2018-10-27	Religious activity
Moskalenko, Valeriy	51	Detention Center No. 1, Khabarovsk Territory	4 months	2018-12-02	Religious activity
Sorokina, Nataliya	43	Detention Center No. 1, Smolensk Region	1 month 12 days	2018-11-19	Religious activity
Troshina, Mariya	41	Detention Center No. 1, Smolensk Region	1 month 12 days	2018-11-19	Religious activity
Onishchuk, Andzhey	50	Unconfirmed	1 month 24 days	2018-12-02	Religious activity
Korobeynikov, Vladimir	65	Unconfirmed	Unconfirmed		Religious activity
Suvorkov, Andrey	25	Unconfirmed	1 month 25 days	2018-12-03	Religious activity
Suvorkov, Evgeniy	40	Unconfirmed	1 month 24 days	2018-12-02	Religious activity
Khalturin, Maksim	44	Unconfirmed	1 month 24 days	2018-12-02	Religious activity
Ivanov, Dmitry	24	Unconfirmed	8,5 years		Political activism

- Mikhail Kosenko
- Nikolay Kavkazsky
- Ruslan Sokolovsky
- Yaroslav Belousov
- Server Mustafayev
- Emir-Usein Kuku

== Saudi Arabia ==
- Raif Badawi
- Mohammad bin Saleh al-Bajadi
- Saud al-Hashimi
- Khaled al-Johani
- Hamza Kashgari
- Ashraf Fayadh
- Issa al-Hamid
- Alaa Brinji
- Ali Mohammed Baqir al-Nimr
- Zuhair Kutbi
- Mikhlif al-Shammari
- Waleed Abu al-Khair
- Abdulaziz al-Shubaili
- Saleh al-Ashwan
- Omar al-Said
- Abdulrahman al-Hamid
- Abdulkareem al-Khoder
- Abdullah al-Hamid
- Mohammad Fahad al-Qahtani
- Fowzan al-Harbi
- Fadhel al-Manasif

== Singapore ==
- Amos Yee

== Sudan ==
- Ussamah Mohammed
- Faisal Saleh

== Syria ==
- Ali al-Abdullah
- Mazen Darwish
- Shibal Ibrahim
- Riad Seif

== Thailand ==
- Somyot Prueksakasemsuk

== Tunisia ==
- Ramzi Abcha
- Ghazi Beji

== Turkey ==
- Leyla Zana
- Orhan Dogan
- Hatip Dicle
- Selim Sadak

== Ukraine ==
- Ruslan Kotsaba

== United States ==
- Martin Sostre (imprisoned 1967–1976)
- Imari Obadele (imprisoned 1973–1978)
- Wilmington Ten, nine men and a woman, (imprisoned 1976–1980)
- Charlotte Three, three men (imprisoned 1977–1979)
- Camilo Mejía (imprisoned 2004–2005)
- Agustin Aguayo (imprisoned 2007)
- Kimberly Rivera (imprisoned 2012–2013)

== United Arab Emirates ==
- Nasser bin Ghaith

== Uzbekistan ==
- Azam Farmonov
- Alisher Karamatov
- Solijon Abdrahmanov

== Venezuela ==
- Gabriel Rivas Granadillo
- Jose Antonio Landaeta Gatica
- Leopoldo López
- Rosmit Mantilla
- Villca Fernández
- Gregory Hinds
- Geraldine Chacón
- Rubén González
- Darvinson Rojas

== Vietnam ==
- Cù Huy Hà Vũ
- Lê Công Định
- Nguyễn Đan Quế
- Nguyễn Văn Hải
- Thadeus Nguyễn Văn Lý
- Phan Thanh Hải
- Tạ Phong Tần
- Trần Huỳnh Duy Thức
- Trần Anh Kim
- Vi Đức Hồi

== Yugoslavia ==
- Adem Demaçi
- Dragan Bogdanovski
