= Nabavi =

Nabavi (Persian: نبوی) is a common Iranian family name. Notable people with the surname include:

- Atefeh Nabavi, Iranian student activist
- Behzad Nabavi (born 1941), Iranian politician
- Ebrahim Nabavi (1958–2025), Iranian satirist
- Gita Nabavi (born 1982), Swedish politician
- Mohsen Nabavi, Iranian director
- Morteza Nabavi, Iranian politician
- Sayed Ziaoddin Nabavi, Iranian human rights activist
