= Atefeh =

Atefeh (Persian: عاطفه, lit. 'feelings, affection, kind-hearted'), is a feminine given name of Persian origin.

People with this name include:

- Atefeh Ahmadi (born 2000), Iranian alpine skier
- Atefeh Nabavi, Iranian student activist
- Atefeh Razavi (born 1969), Iranian actress and makeup artist
- Atefeh Riazi, American information technologist
- Atefeh Sahaaleh (1987–2004), Iranian convicted woman, charged with crime after being raped for many years, and then executed
