= Nadiah Bamadhaj =

Malaysian artist and writer (born 1968)

- Born: 1968 (age 57–58); Petaling Jaya, Malaysia
- Education: Canterbury School of Fine Arts, New Zealand
- Known for: Artist, lecturer, writer, human rights advocate
- Movement: Contemporary art

Nadiah Bamadhaj (born 1968) is an artist born in Petaling Jaya, Malaysia, and residing in Yogyakarta, Indonesia.

She is an artist with expansive artistic practices, a lecturer in fine art and also a writer who writes about human rights in Indonesia and Malaysia. She has created artworks focusing on both Malaysia and Indonesian histories and politics and worked in non-governmental organisations working among the HIV-positive.

Her works have engaged with various sociopolitical histories, more specifically focusing on Malaysia and Indonesia's nationalist social and forgotten histories, as well as gender and identity.

She was also the recipient of various grants, including the Nippon Foundation's Asian Public Intellectual Fellowship between 2002 and 2004.

== Background and education ==
Nadiah Bamadhaj was born in Petaling Jaya, Malaysia, in 1968 as a child by descent of a New Zealand mother and Malaysian father.

She received her art education at Canterbury School of Fine Art, New Zealand . After finishing art school, Bamadhaj worked on HIV education amongst sex workers, before returning to fine art practice. She is a board member of a HIV/AIDS homeless shelter in Yogyakarta, called Yayasan Kebaya.

She also has family history based in Singapore, where one of her video artworks, Not Talking to a Brick Wall (2005) was layered with historical photographs of her ancestral family home, located in Geylang, Singapore.

Bamadhaj has received numerous grants for her works, including the Nippon Foundations's Asian Public Intellectual Fellowship (2002–2004), the Indonesian Directorate General of Cultural (2022) as well as from the Arts Council of New Zealand (2022).

== Artistic practice and artworks ==
While trained as a sculptor at New Zealand's Canterbury School of Fine Arts, Bamadhaj's expansive artistic practice also includes drawings, site-specific installations, digital media and print artworks, as well as creating collaged drawings of a specific technique developed through the years. While better recognised for her charcoal and collage drawings, some of her recent new works have also incorporated collage with gold leaf.

Bamadhaj's earlier works focused on, and interrogated some of Southeast Asian countries histories and politics, of which Malaysia and Indonesia have been her continued focus and interest. Her exhibition 1965: Membina Semula Monumennya (Rebuilding Its Monuments, 2001) at Galeri Petronas, Kuala Lumpur, looked to Indonesia, Malaysia and Singapore in the context of 'Cold War' and 'communists' in how separate events in these countries in 1965 were nevertheless entangled, as each event impacted and influenced the others and how existing monuments commemorating some such events perpetuated old myths and continued to inflict damage.

Her later works, such as enamlima sekarang (2003) took up the historical event and subject of the Gerakan 30 September (G30S, or the 30 September movement) in Indonesia. Through the Malay word sekarang (now) in the artwork's title, Bamadhaj sought to address questions such as the mystery surrounding an 'aborted coup', the incomprehensible violence that nevertheless happened after the aborted coup, and how did the masses turn to massacre.

Her collaborative exhibition with Malaysian political activist Tian Chua, titled 147 Tahun Merdeka (2005), was a creation of an imagined future of Malaysia through digital manipulations of one of Malaysia's iconic public monuments dedicated to the May 1969 events in Malaysia, suggesting the need and possibilities for multiple reconciliatory strategies to address the multiplicity of traumas.

Bamadhaj's subsequent artworks focused on power dynamics of the body and land, gender, Malay identities which were often idealised, as well as important issues of social justice. The Island focused on the built environment, specifically then-planned new administrative city and capital, Putrajaya in Kuala Lumpur, Malaysia, by former Malaysian Prime Minister, Mahathir Mohammad, while simultaneously interrogating cultural notions surrounding the songkok, a Malay ceremonial costume traditionally worn in formal government events and presentation ceremonies, as well as a symbol of Malay male authority.

Her other series of artworks, Taman Impian Jaya and Landlocked composed of topographical maps featuring suburban estates juxtaposed with Bamadhaj's self-portrait, suggesting identity's fixities onto physical locations and the various ideologies of such sites, while simultaneously bringing up aspects of the idealised docile female and suburban dream life of modern Malaysians respectively.

Her current artworks look to Indonesian society and its intricacies of life, expressed through the use of flora and fauna, figures, mythologies, architecture and batik motifs.
