= Goudarzi =

Goudarzi is a Persian surname. Notable people with the surname include:

- Fatemeh Goudarzi (born 1963), Iranian actress
- Kouhyar Goudarzi (born 1986), Iranian human rights activist and journalist
- Emam-Ali Habibi Goudarzi (born 1931), Iranian freestyle wrestler
- Sadegh Goudarzi (born 1997), Iranian wrestler
- Ali Goudarzi (born 1992), Iranian footballer
- Shahram Goudarzi (born 1987), Iranian footballer
- Mahmoud Goudarzi (born c. 1955), Iranian politician and wrestler

== See also ==
- Goudarz, a character in the Shahnameh
- Gotarzes (disambiguation)
