= Riazi =

Riazi (Persian: ریاضی, lit. 'math or mathematics') is a surname of Iranian origin.

People with this name include:

- Abdollah Riazi (1905–1979), Iranian politician
- Atefeh Riazi, American information technologist and public administrator
- Shokouh Riazi (1921–1962), Iranian modernist painter, educator
