= Gotarzes =

Gotarzes (Parthian: 𐭂𐭅𐭕𐭓𐭆 Gōtarz, Ancient Greek: Γωτάρζης Gōtarzēs) was the name of two Parthian kings:

- Gotarzes I c. 95–90 BC
- Gotarzes II c. 40–51 AD

== See also ==
- Goudarz, a character in the Shahnameh
- Goudarzi (disambiguation)
