= Buchtar Tabuni =

Papuan activist

- Born: May 10, 1979 (age 47); West Papua, Indonesia
- Occupations: Political activist, politician
- Organization: National Committee for West Papua (KNPB)
- Known for: West Papuan independence movement
- Title: Chairman of the National Parliament of West Papua (PNWP)

Buchtar Tabuni (born 1979) is a Papuan independence activist, Chairman of the National Parliament of West Papua (PNWP), incorporating the National Committee for West Papua (Komite Nasional Papua Barat, KNPB), and United Liberation Movement for West Papua (ULMWP) representative.

== Background ==
Indonesia's control over the western Papua region has been disputed since 1963, when the country took control of the province from the Dutch. A separatist movement formed, battling the Indonesian government for more than four decades. During this time, one sixth of the province's population died in military operations. Papuans also cite economic issues, stating that the area's natural resources are exploited exclusively "for the benefit of the national capital, Jakarta".

== Biography ==
Buchtar studied engineering in Makassar, South Sulawesi. In 2008, he organized the International Parliamentarians for West Papua (IPWP), an organization devoted to repealing the Act of Free Choice, the 1969 referendum that had given Indonesia sovereignty over West Papua.

He was arrested on 3 December 2008, in his house in Sentani, Jayapura Regency, for organizing a 16 October protest supporting the launch of IPWP in the UK Parliament. The following day, fifty protesters gathered outside the Jayapura police station to call for his release.

Prosecutors sought a ten-year sentence against him on three charges: an act of treason (Article 106), provocation (Article 160), and acts against the state (Article 212). Buchtar's attorneys described the case as an attempt to stifle free speech in Papua, asking, "If outside Papua, people can freely raise their opinions, why is free speech still restrained in Papua, and treated as treason?" Amnesty International considered him to be a prisoner of conscience, "imprisoned solely for peacefully expressing [his] views". Human Rights Watch also lobbied for his release along with that of other non-violent Papuan political prisoners.

In January 2011, Amnesty reported that Buchtar and fellow Papuan activist Filep Karma had been transferred from the Abepura prison to isolation cells at the Jayapura police station and were at risk of torture. Buchtar was released from prison on 17 August 2011.

On 8 June 2012, Buchtar was arrested again in Jayapura on charges of organizing violent protests. On 23 July, another activist, Yusak Pakage, was arrested during Buchtar's trial for having a penknife in his bag. Pakage was charged with "possession of a weapon", which carries a maximum sentence of ten years' imprisonment.

== See also ==
- Human rights in Indonesia
