= Left Socialist Action =

Left Socialist Action Левое социалистическое действие
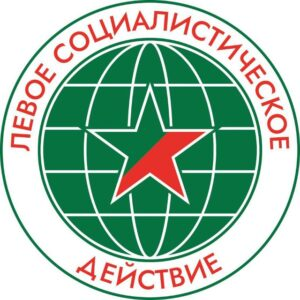
- Abbreviation: LevSD
- Central Organizing Committee: Nikita Arkin; Tatiana Shavshukova; Igor Filippov; Irina Zabelina; Isabelle Kurygina; Nikolay Kavkazsky; Yuri Ioffe; Sashetta Morozova; Ludmila Sherbatyh
- Founded: August 2007
- Ideology: Social democracy Democratic socialism Factions: Libertarian socialism Marxism
- Political position: Centre-left to left-wing
- National affiliation: Union of Democratic Socialists
- Colours: Red; Green
- Slogan: «Freedom! Justice! Solidarity!» (Russian: «Свобода! Справедливость! Солидарность!»)

Party flag
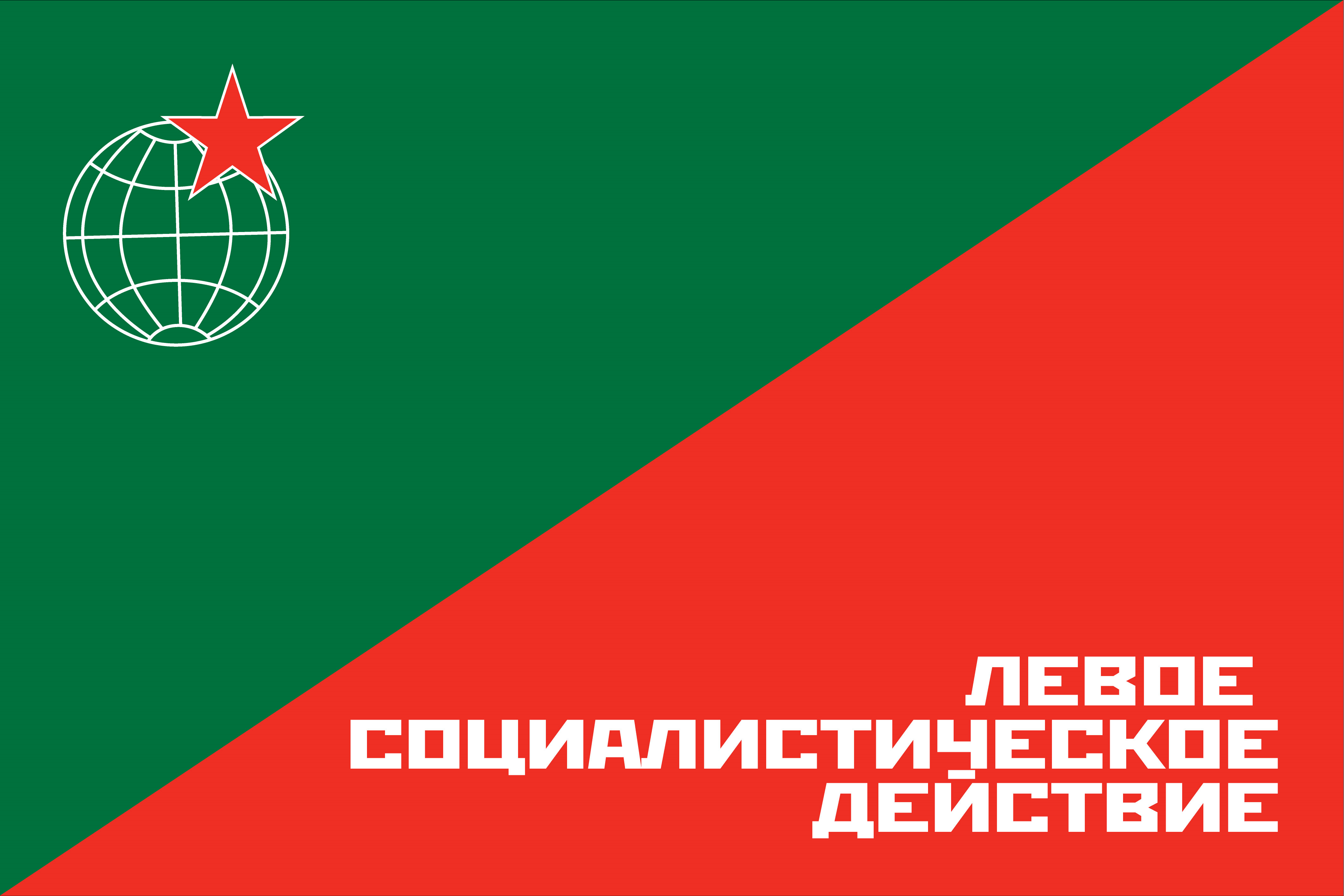

Website
- levsd.ru

Left Socialist Action or Left Social Democrats (LevSD Russian: Левое социалистическое действие / Левые социал-демократы, romanized: Levoye sotsialisticheskoye deystviye / Levyye sotsial-demokraty) is a social democratic and democratic socialist political organization in Russia founded in August 2007.

The movement is part of the Union of Democratic Socialists.

== Ideology ==
According to the statements of one of the leaders of the movement, Nikolay Kavkazsky (also member of Yabloko), the LevSD "is equally far removed from Bolshevik authoritarianism and from the opportunism of modern right-wing social democrats". In the "Declaration of the Socialists of Russia", the current state system, in particular, is characterized as nomenclature, authoritarian and Bonapartist. The document enshrined the social democrats' rejection of clericalism and obscurantism, xenophobia and poverty. According to the movement, social democracy implies a secular state, free democratic elections, support for trade unions, affordable housing and medicine, the introduction of a progressive tax, the correspondence of the minimum wage to the living wage, the rejection of all types of discrimination and respect for nature.

== Activities ==
LevSD activists participated in many opposition protests: such as Strategy-31, Rallies on Bolotnaya Square, as well as trade union, environmental, feminist, pro-minorities and pro-LGBT rallies.

In 2014, LevSD supported Euromaidan in Ukraine.

In 2022, the activists of the movement participated in anti-war and anti-censorship protests in Russia.
