= José Francisco Gallardo Rodríguez =

Mexican General, academic and politician (~1946-2021)

- Born: October 6, 1946
- Died: April 29, 2021 (aged 74); Mexico City
- Other name: General Gallardo
- Occupation: Mexican General
- Known for: Advocating for a military ombudsman, being a political prisoner

José Francisco Gallardo Rodríguez (6 October 1946 – 29 April 2021) often known as General Gallardo was a Mexican military general and academic who ran for the governorship of Colima twice.

He was court-martialled and dismissed from the Mexican Army after advocating for the creation of a military ombudsman. After spending eight years in prison and becoming an Amnesty International Prisoner of Conscience, his charges were dismissed by the Inter-American Court of Human Rights.

After his release he worked for the National Autonomous University of Mexico and as an advisor to the Mexican Senate.

Gallardo died in 2021 of COVID-19.

== Early life and education ==
Gallardo was born 1946 or 1947.

Has a Ph.D. in Public Administration.

== Career ==
Gallardo worked for the Mexican Army and was promoted to second lieutenant on January 1, 1967, to lieutenant on July 15, 1969, to second captain on February 1, 1973, to first captain on March 31, 1976, to major on November 16, 1979, to lieutenant colonel on Dec 31 1982 to colonel on November 14, 1986, and to general on June 21, 1989.

As a military general, Gallardo advocated for the creation of a military ombudsman publishing parts of his academic thesis in the Mexican magazine Forum. Military leaders were strongly opposed to a military ombudsman and Gallardo was arrested on November 9, 1993, to face court-martial. Eduardo Ibarra Aguirre, the publisher of Forum, was also arrested.

At the court-martial, he was tried for embezzlement and destruction of military files and was sentenced to 14 years in prison on March 10, 1998. He denied both charges.

He was dismissed from the army on October 8, 1998 and spent over eight years in prison, being released after his case reached the Inter-American Court of Human Rights. He was released on February 7, 2022. The court heard allegations that Gallardo was the subject of threats and harassment since his advocacy for the ombudsman.

He was adopted as an Amnesty International Prisoner of Conscience in 1994 and awarded the Don Sergio Méndez Arceo National Human Rights Award in 1997.

He unsuccessfully ran for Governor of Colima in 2016 and 2019 and worked as an academic at the National Autonomous University of Mexico and as an advisor to the Mexican Senate.

== Family life and death ==
Gallardo died of COVID-19 on April 29, 2021 at 12:02pm in a hospital in Mexico City, after five weeks of hospitalization.

He fathered a son, Francisco Gallardo.

== See also ==
- List of Amnesty International-designated prisoners of conscience
- Sylvia Aguilera García
