= Human rights in Indonesia =

Human rights in Indonesia are defined by the 1945 Constitution (UUD 1945) and the laws under it; several rights are guaranteed especially as a result of the constitutional amendments following the Reform era. As of 2024, the Ministry of Human Rights, under the Coordinating Ministry for Legal, Human Rights, Immigration, and Correction, deals with human rights issues in the cabinet, and the National Commission on Human Rights (Komnas HAM), established in Suharto's New Order administration in 1993, is the country's national human rights institution.

In 2024, Freedom House rated Indonesia's human rights freedom as 57 out of 100 (partly free).

== Overview ==
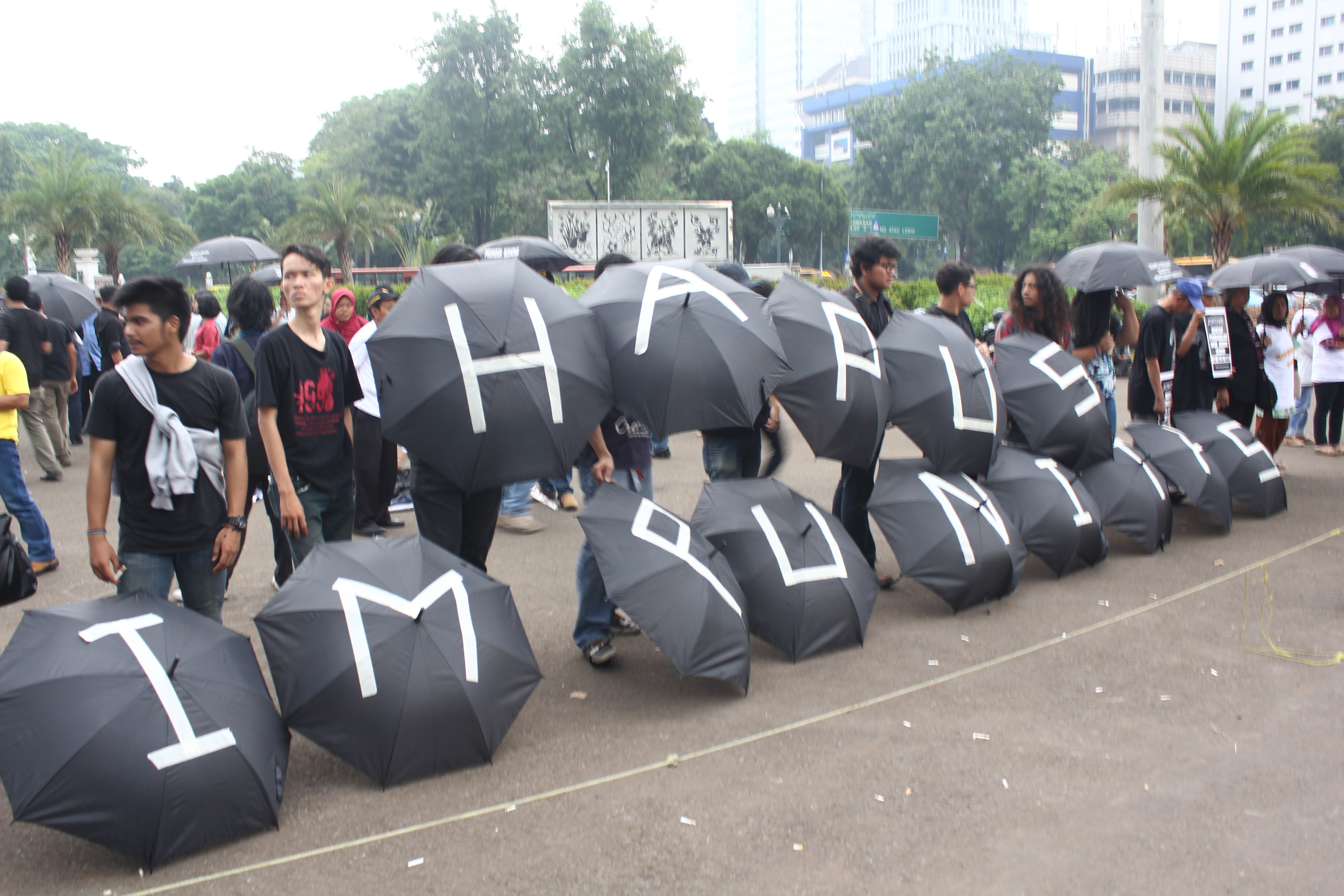
Aksi Kamisan: a peaceful thursday demonstrations in front of the State Palace demand the resolution of past human rights violations

Advocates for human rights have noted actions by the government of Indonesia as concerning. Although the country has had Komnas HAM, which enjoys a degree of independence from government and holds United Nations accreditation, the commission itself has little effect as it was not given any legal teeth against discriminatory practices committed by the government.

Reports by Amnesty International, Human Rights Watch, and the United States Department of State highlighted the most common human rights issues in Indonesia, namely the situation in Western New Guinea region, the treatment of religious, gender and sexual minorities, sexual and reproductive rights, the rights of women, children, LGBT, and the disabled, and freedom of expression and association.

Joko Widodo became the second Indonesian president to acknowledge past human rights abuses in his country. He publicly acknowledged the bloodshed of the 1960s. He also cited 12 cases, including massacres by anti-communists, from 1965 to 1969, highlighting human rights violations in the Papua region. He assured that such serious human rights violations would never happen again.

While democratic reforms have strengthened civil liberties since the fall of Suharto in 1998, concerns remain over military influence in civilian affairs, restrictions on freedom of expression, and ongoing discrimination against minorities. Amendments in 2025 to military law and increasing reports of intimidation against journalists highlighted continuing challenges.

== Legislation ==
In the original text of the 1945 Constitution (before amendments) there are various basic rights and obligations for citizens, but the term "human rights" itself is not mentioned in the text. According to Indonesian legal expert and current Coordinating Ministry for Political, Legal, and Security Affairs Mahfud MD, human rights are different from citizen rights contained in the 1945 Constitution, because human rights are considered rights inherent in humans naturally, while citizen rights are particular rights acquired because of one's Indonesian citizenship. On the other hand, Soedjono Sumobroto said that human rights are actually implied in the 1945 Constitution through Pancasila. In addition, in the preamble, content, and explanation of the current constitution, there are at least 15 principles of human rights.

Meanwhile, other legal experts like Kuntjoro Purbopranoto have observed that there are human rights guarantees in the 1945 Constitution but not included systematically. According to him, there are only four articles that contain human rights provisions, namely Articles 27, 28, 29 and 31. Legal expert Solly Lubis also believes that the formulation of rights in the constitution is indeed very simple and brief, but according to Majda El Muhtaj this is natural because the drafting of the 1945 Constitution was too short to catch up with the time so that the 1945 Constitution could become the foundation for the newly independent state of Indonesia. The constitution itself was originally in effect from 18 August 1945 to 27 December 1945, but its enactment was ineffective due to the national revolution and socio-political conditions that were not conducive at the time.

After the Round Table Conference, the 1949 Constitution of the United States of Indonesia (RIS Constitution) came into effect. The constitution does not explicitly mention the word "human rights", however it clearly stipulates human rights in Part V entitled "Basic Human Rights and Freedoms". This section contains 27 articles, namely Articles 7 to 33. In addition, the 1949 RIS Constitution also sets out the basic obligations of the state related to human rights enforcement efforts in Section 6 ("Basic Principles"), itself consists of 8 articles. This emphasis on human rights is the influence of the Universal Declaration of Human Rights adopted by the United Nations General Assembly on 10 December 1948. The 1945 Constitution were returned into effect in 1959, and only underwent a number of amendments (including the human rights provisions) after the fall of the New Order.

Human rights provisions then further stipulated in Act Number 39 of 1999 on Human Rights (Undang-Undang Nomor 39 Tahun 1999 tentang Hak Asasi Manusia).

However, new legislation, such as the 2025 amendment to the 2004 Military Law, has raised concerns about potential democratic backsliding by expanding the military's role in civilian governance.

== Use of force and impunity ==
The Indonesian National Police (Polri) used excessive force against demonstrators and protesters, especially concerning land dispute cases. In the rare instances where investigations took place, little progress was made in bringing perpetrators to justice.

- In January, six palm oil farmers were seriously injured in Jambi Province after Police Mobile Brigade (Brimob) officers fired rubber bullets at them in an attempt to evict them from a plantation on which they were working. The plantation was the subject of an ongoing land dispute between the farmers and a palm oil company.
- In June, security forces used unnecessary and excessive force while attempting to evict forcibly a community in Langkat district, North Sumatra. The community had been involved in a land dispute with the local authorities. When the community protested against the eviction, police officers fired on the crowd without warning, injuring at least nine people. Six others were kicked and beaten.

Amnesty International reports that over the last decade, significant steps have been taken to reform the Polri. The government has put in place legislative and structural reforms to strengthen their effectiveness in preventing and detecting crime, maintaining public order and promoting the rule of law. The police have also introduced internal regulations to ensure that international human rights standards are upheld during policing operations. Despite these positive moves, credible reports of human rights violations committed by the police continue to emerge, with the police routinely using unnecessary and excessive force and firearms to quell peaceful protests. Police have been implicated in beatings, shootings and killings of people during mass demonstrations, land disputes or even routine arrests.

Although the authorities have made some attempts to bring alleged perpetrators to justice using internal disciplinary mechanisms, criminal investigations into human rights violations by the police are all too rare, leaving many victims without access to justice and reparations. This situation is made worse by the lack of an independent, effective, and impartial complaints mechanism which can deal with public complaints about police misconduct, including criminal offences involving human rights violations. While existing bodies such as the Komnas HAM or the National Police Commission (Kompolnas) are able to receive and investigate complaints from the public, they are not empowered to refer these cases directly to the Public Prosecutor's Office or the police internal disciplinary body.

Repeated allegations of torture and otherwise ill-treating detainees by security forces, particularly peaceful political activists in areas with a history of independence movements such as Papua and Maluku region, has been reported. Independent investigations into such allegations were rare. There were no investigations into allegations of torture and other ill-treatment of 21 peaceful political activists by Special Detachment-88 (Densus-88), a police counter-terrorism unit. The 21 had been tortured during arrest, detention and interrogation in Maluku in August 2010. Caning was increasingly used as a form of judicial punishment in Aceh. At least 72 people were caned for various offences, including drinking alcohol, being alone with someone of the opposite sex who was not a marriage partner or relative (khalwat), and for gambling. The Acehnese authorities passed a series of by-laws governing the implementation of Sharia after the enactment of the province's Special Autonomy Law in 2001.

On 29 August 2020, Indonesian police forcibly raided on a private gathering of 56 men in Jakarta, arresting nine men and charging them with the crime of "facilitating obscene acts", which discriminates against the LGBT community. The charges violated the right to privacy, association and equal protection of the law, and highlighted the threat to the rights of lesbian, gay, bisexual, and transgender (LGBT) people in the country.

In March 2025, pro-democracy groups argued that recent legal changes risked reinstating the military’s historical impunity.

== Discrimination ==
=== Religious ===
Freedom of religion in Indonesia only applies to adherents of six major religious groupings, Buddhism, Catholicism, Confucianism, Hinduism, Islam and Protestantism. Questioning any of those six religious groupings can lead to five years in prison for "insulting a major religion" and six more years in prison if the act occurs on the Internet. Indonesia's Criminal Code prohibits blasphemy. In July 2005, the MUI issued a fatwa that condemned the sect of Ahmadiyya as heretical. In June 2008, the Ministry of Religious Affairs and the Ministry of Home Affairs issued a Joint Ministerial Letter regarding the Ahmadiyya. The letter told authorities to restrict Ahmadiyya activities to private worship and to prevent Amadhi Muslims from proselytising. Provincial governors in West Sumatra, South Sumatra, and West Nusa Tenggara banned all Ahmadiyya activity. At least 18 Christian churches had been attacked or forced to close down. In many cases, the police failed to protect religious and other minority groups adequately from such attacks.

- In February, three Ahmadis were killed after a 1,500-person mob attacked them in Cikeusik, Banten Province. On 28 July 12, people were sentenced to between three and six months' imprisonment for their involvement in the incident. No one was charged with murder, and local human rights groups raised concerns about the weak prosecution.
- The Mayor of Bogor continued to defy a 2010 Supreme Court ruling ordering the authorities to reopen the Taman Yasmin Indonesian Christian Church. The congregation was forced to conduct its weekly services on the pavement outside the closed church, amid protests from radical groups.

In November 2018, the Indonesian government released a smartphone app called "Smart Pakem" which allows its users to file a report to the Jakarta Prosecutor's Office anyone suspected of practising officially unrecognised faiths or of having unorthodox interpretations of Indonesia's six officially recognised religions.

In 2024, Freedom House rated Indonesia's religious freedom as 1 out of 4, noting that Indonesia officially recognizes six religions. While individuals may leave the "religion" section on their identity cards blank, doing so often leads to discrimination, especially for adherents of unrecognized faiths. Atheism is not legally accepted, and the criminal code contains provisions against blasphemy, penalizing those who "distort" or "misrepresent" recognized faiths. Building a new house of worship is challenging due to the 2006 Joint Ministerial Decision, which requires approval from both congregation members and local residents.

Religious and ethnic minorities, including Ahmadiyah and Shia Muslims, as well as Indigenous Papuans, continue to face systemic discrimination. Laws restricting religious freedom and local regulations enforcing conservative interpretations of Islam have exacerbated tensions.

=== LGBT ===
LGBT people in the country regularly face challenges. Although LGBT issues have been relatively obscure, the 2010s (especially after 2016) has seen a rapid surge of anti-LGBT rhetoric, putting LGBT Indonesians into a frequent subject of intimidation, discrimination, and even violence.

In January 2018, the Aceh police ransacked a parlour with support from the Aceh autonomous government. The police tortured all LGBT citizens within the premises of the parlour, shaved the heads of transgender women, stripped their shirts and bras, and paraded them in the street while forcing to shout 'to become men'. This event caused massive outrage from human rights organisation throughout the world, including liberal parts of Asia.

In February 2018, the government announced plans to pass legislation that would criminalise gay sex. The legislation is supported by eight of the ten political parties of the country and is expected to pass before Valentine's Day, though it was suspended after President Jokowi calls for the bill to be canceled after massive amounts of protests. As of 2021, homosexuality could not be prosecuted by the law, but Indonesia only recognises heterosexual marriage. In 2020, party members from Partai Keadilan Sejahtera, an Islamic-based party, proposed a controversial bill called "Family Defense Act" that marginalize homosexuality and BDSM fetishes. The bill failed to pass after five fractions in the DPR house of representatives agreed to have the bill rejected.

== Capital punishment ==
Indonesia's continuation of capital punishment, and the often corrupt judiciary and military has also led to political altercations with several human rights groups.

Indonesia retains the death penalty for drug offenses, terrorism, and other crimes. Despite international criticism, executions continue sporadically. Human rights organizations argue for its abolition, citing unfair trials and lack of transparency.

== Labour rights ==
Human rights in Indonesia
- National organization(s): SBSI
- Regulatory authority: Ministry of Manpower
- Primary legislation: Manpower Law (Law No. 13 of 2003); Industrial Relation Dispute Law (Law No. 2 of 2004); 2020 Omnibus Law on Job Creation; 2023 Omnibus Law on Job Creation

Global Rights Index
- 5 No guarantee of rights

International Labour Organization
- Indonesia is a member of the ILO

In October 2020, the Indonesian People's Representative Council passed the 2020 Omnibus Law on Job Creation that "restricts labor rights and dismantles environmental protections, including by threatening Indigenous people's access to land and the country's declining rainforests". According to the Human Rights Watch (HRW), this law weakens the protections for workers offered in the manpower law from 2003, as well as the existing environmental laws and legal protections for Indigenous groups.

The law was widely criticized by workers, prompting protests across Indonesia, particularly in the capital, Jakarta. On 21 March 2023, the amended legislation, presented as the 2023 Omnibus Law on Job Creation, was passed. It came into effect on 31 March 2023, at which point the 2020 Omnibus Law was repealed.

Indonesia scored 5 on the Global Rights Index (GRI) by the International Trade Union Confederation (ITUC), which signifies "no guarantee of rights".

=== Domestic workers ===
In June 2012, the president expressed support for the new ILO No. 189 Domestic Workers Convention. However, for a second successive year, parliament failed to debate and enact legislation providing legal protection for domestic workers. This left an estimated 2.6 million domestic workers – the vast majority of them women and girls – at continued risk of economic exploitation and physical, psychological and sexual violence.

== Sexual and reproductive rights ==
From the Amnesty International's 2012 Annual Report:

Women and girls, especially those from impoverished and marginalised communities, were prevented from fully exercising their sexual and reproductive rights. Many [vague] continue to be denied the reproductive health services provided for in the 2009 Health Law, as the Ministry of Health had yet to issue the necessary implementing regulation. The government failed to challenge discriminatory attitudes and cruel, inhuman and degrading practices, including female genital mutilation and early marriages. In June, the Minister of Health defended a November 2010 regulation permitting specifically defined forms of "female circumcision" when performed by doctors, nurses and midwives. The regulation legitimised the widespread practice of female genital mutilation. It also violated several Indonesian laws and contradicted government pledges to enhance gender equality and combat discrimination against women.

In 2018, the Indonesian Supreme Court convicted a woman who had recorded a telephone conversation with her boss where he harassed her sexually. She was sentenced to six months in jail.

Since the 2023 Indonesian Penal Code came into force in January 2026, premarital sex and extramarital sex may be punished if a complaint is filed by a parent, child, or spouse (Article 411).

=== Abortion ===
Abortion is illegal according to Article 75, Section 1 of Undang-Undang Nomor 39 Tahun 2009 Tentang Kesehatan (Law No. 39 of 2009 on Health). Article 75, Section 2 of the Law on Health provides exception for medical emergencies during early pregnancy, a threat to the life of the mother and fetus, a genetic disorder or congenital disorder that might create difficulties for the baby's life, and for a pregnancy caused by rape. According to Article 76 of the law, abortion is allowed to be done before six weeks of pregnancy counted from the last menstruation unless in an emergency, must be performed by a certified health professional, done with the consent of the pregnant woman, with the consent of the husband (unless if the pregnancy is caused by rape), and in a ministry-approved location. According to Article 194 of the law, every person who does abortion not in accordance to Article 75, Section 2 can get a maximum jail time of 10 years and a maximum fine of 1 billion rupiahs. However, in 2024, abortion was legalized for up to 14 weeks of pregnancy in Indonesia in cases of medical emergency and rape.

== West Papua issues ==
International human rights organisations have criticised the Indonesian government's handling of protesters from the Free Papua Movement (OPM) in the Papua conflict, in which the OPM seeks the secession of Papua and West Papua. High-profile prisoners from this movement include Filep Karma and Buchtar Tabuni, both of whom are considered to be prisoners of conscience by Amnesty International. A report to the Indonesian Human Rights Network by the Allard K Lowenstein International Human Rights Clinic, Yale Law School alleges human rights violations in the region. The Indonesian National Military (TNI) denies allegations of human rights abuses in Papua. Between 1969 and 2016, Indonesia had killed approximately 500,000 Papuans, with human rights abuses continuing into the subsequent decade.

In 2005, President Susilo Bambang Yudhoyono (SBY) carried out a policy change away from "law and order" and towards economic development to arrest separatism in Papua. In May 2010, the release of Papuan political prisoners who had demonstrated for independence was announced. In October, a video emerged apparently showing soldiers kicking and abusing alleged separatists in Papua. The government confirmed that the men were members of the TNI. The minister for security said their actions were excessive and unprofessional, and that they would be punished. 100,000 Papuans are estimated to have been killed by the Indonesian government since 1963.

On 30 November 2020, a spokesperson for the Office of the High Commissioner for Human Rights (OHCHR) stated that a meaningful and inclusive dialogue is required to address longstanding economic, social and political grievances in the provinces of Papua and West Papua.

Other atrocities include the following:

- In January, three soldiers who had been filmed kicking and verbally abusing Papuans were sentenced by a military court to between eight and ten months' imprisonment for disobeying orders. A senior Indonesian government official described the abuse as a "minor violation".
- In April, police in Papua shot Dominokus Auwe in the chest and head, killing him, and wounded two others in front of the Moanemani sub-district police station. The three men had approached the station peacefully to inquire about money the police had seized from Auwe earlier that day.

The government continued to criminalise peaceful political expression in Maluku and Papua. At least 90 political activists were imprisoned for their peaceful political activities.

- In August, two Papuan political activists, Melkianus Bleskadit and Daniel Yenu, were imprisoned for up to two years for their involvement in a peaceful political protest in Manokwari town in December 2010.
- In October, over 300 people were arbitrarily arrested after participating in the Third Papuan People's Congress, a peaceful gathering held in Abepura town, Papua Province. Although most were held overnight and released the next day, five were charged with "rebellion" under Article 106 of the Criminal Code. The charge could carry a maximum life sentence. A preliminary investigation by the National Human Rights Commission (Komnas HAM) found that the security forces had committed a range of human rights violations, including opening fire on participants at the gathering, and beating and kicking them.

Some human rights activists and journalists continued to be intimidated and attacked because of their work.

- In March 2011, journalist Banjir Ambarita was stabbed by unidentified persons in the province of Papua shortly after he had written about two cases of women who were reportedly raped by police officers in Papua. He survived the attack.
- In June 2011, military officers beat Yones Douw, a human rights defender in Papua, after he tried to monitor a protest calling for accountability for the possible unlawful killing of Papuan Derek Adii in May

== Anti-Chinese legislation ==
During the early years of Indonesian independence, Indonesia enacted a series of laws and directives that affected Chinese Indonesians. Foreigners, including the Chinese, were forbidden to conduct retail business in rural areas, were required to hand over their businesses to the locals, and were required to move to urban areas. The policy of discrimination was continued by President Suharto.

Most, if not all, of the discriminatory laws were revoked during the Reformation Era under President Abdurrahman Wahid. After the era, Chinese-Indonesian politicians have emerged, such as Basuki Tjahaja Purnama (former Governor of Jakarta) and Hary Tanoesoedibjo (businessman and leader of Perindo Party).

== Freedom of expression ==
Despite constitutional guarantees, press freedom in Indonesia remains under threat. Investigative journalists and media outlets face increasing intimidation, censorship, and harassment.

On 10 June 2020, Human Rights Watch urged the Indonesian authorities to drop all charges against seven Papuan activists and students, who are on trial for their involvement in anti-racism protests last year in August. On 2 December 2019, four students along with the other 50 students, peacefully protested against the human rights abuses in Papua and West Papua, asking the Indonesian government to release the Papuan political prisoners. A civil lawsuit was filed against 4 student activists following their expulsion from their university. On 13 July 2020, the police charged one of the four students with "treason" and "public provocation." Human Rights Watch urged the Indonesia's Khairun University to reinstate the four students who were expelled and support academic freedom and free expression.

The ministry is often criticized for its censorship, as it blocks websites "to protect its citizen from hoax" [sic]. In 2020, the Director General Ministry Semuel Abrijani Pangerapan and Johnny G. Plate introduced a law that requires foreign companies to register under the Electronic System Operator list which could give the government access to the citizen's personal info and threaten the company to block access from the country if the company did not register. The law was revised and passed in 2021. In July 2022, a ban was implemented for several notable websites such as PayPal, Epic Games, Steam, Origin, and Yahoo, and games such as Counter-Strike: Global Offensive and Dota 2 as they did not register under the ministry's new law.

A Swiss tourist was given a one-year prison sentence in 2026 for leaving their hotel during Nyepi, an official day of silence, and calling the holiday "crazy" publicly via social media. Judge Tjokorda Putra Budi Pastima said the person had "offended the Balinese people, hurt their faith[,] and provoked public outrage".

=== 2025 animal carcasses incident ===
In March 2025, Tempo Magazine, known for its critical reporting, was targeted with anonymous terror acts, including the delivery of a pig’s head and headless rats. Press freedom groups, including Amnesty International, have condemned these actions and called for an independent investigation. The government has been criticized for its weak response, with officials making dismissive comments instead of taking action. Meanwhile, digital surveillance and legal measures, such as the Electronic Information and Transactions (ITE) Law, have been used to silence critics, activists, and journalists through defamation and blasphemy charges.

== See also ==
- Censorship in Indonesia
- Accusations of ExxonMobil human rights violations in Indonesia
- Freedom of religion in Indonesia
- Human trafficking in Indonesia
- Indonesian mass killings of 1965–66
- East Timor genocide
- LGBT rights in Indonesia
- May 1998 riots of Indonesia
