= Anar Bayramli =

Azerbaijani journalist

- Born: Anar Bayramli c. 1981; Baku, Azerbaijan SSR, Soviet Union
- Occupation: Journalist
- Organization(s): Fars News Agency, Sahar
- Known for: 2012 imprisonment

Anar Bayramli (Azerbaijani: Ənar Bayramlı; born c. 1981) is an Azerbaijani journalist for Iran's Fars News Agency and Sahar television station. In June 2012, an Azerbaijan court sentenced him to two years' imprisonment on a charge of drug possession. Bayramli's family and several human rights organizations have described the charges as politically motivated. Amnesty International designated him a prisoner of conscience.

== Arrest ==
=== Background ===
Bayramli's arrest came in a year of growing tension between Azerbaijan and Iran. Iran accused Azerbaijan of assisting in the assassination of nuclear scientists, and withdrew its ambassador following complaints by Iranian religious leaders over Azerbaijan's hosting of Eurovision 2012. Both countries accused the other of interfering in their domestic affairs. Azerbaijani authorities had recently criticized Sahar TV, for which Bayramli is a reporter, for "deliberately seeking to destabilize the country". Prior to the arrest, Bayramli had twice been brought to the police station for questioning. He later stated that the police officers pressured him to quit his job with Iranian media.

=== The arrest itself ===
On 17 February 2012, he was again brought to the police station for questioning. After fifteen minutes of questioning, police searched his coat, which had been left unattended in a waiting room. They found a parcel which Bayramli stated he did not recognize containing 0.387 grams of heroin, and Bayramli was charged with drug possession. Bayramli was convicted on 12 June 2012 and sentenced to two years' imprisonment.

=== Response ===
An Iranian embassy official denounced the charge, calling Bayramli "a devout, respectable person" and warning the arrest could worsen relations between the countries.

Several international human rights organizations have questioned the charges against Bayramli. Amnesty International described the charges against him as "politically motivated; trumped up by Azerbaijan’s secular authorities in order to silence their coverage of religious issues". The organization designated him a prisoner of conscience and urged his immediate release. The Committee to Protect Journalists called the charges "trumped-up", comparing the case to that of Eynulla Fatullayev and stating that "silencing government critics by planting drugs on them is a favored method of authorities in Azerbaijan." Human Rights Watch called for an independent investigation into Bayramli's possible framing. In approving the decision to release imprisoned journalist Bakhtiyar Hajiyev on 4 June 2012, the Organization for Security and Cooperation in Europe stated that it hoped Bayramli also would soon be freed.

== See also ==
- Ramin Bayramov
