= Sayed Ziaoddin Nabavi =

Human rights activist

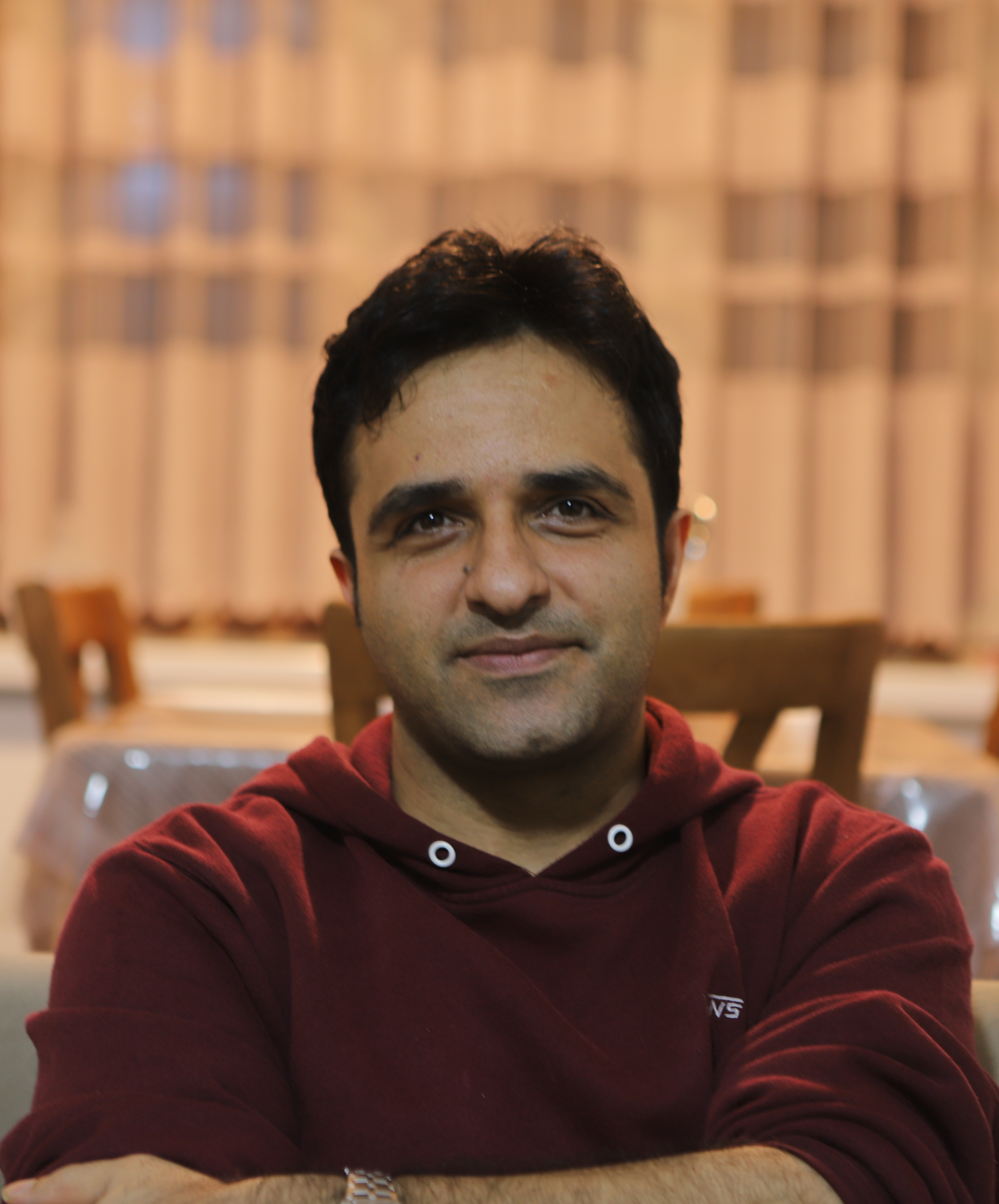
- Born: December 21, 1983 (age 42)
- Other name: Zia Nabavi
- Education: Noshirvani University of Technology
- Occupation: student activist
- Movement: "Green Revolution" protests

Sayed Ziaoddin Nabavi (Persian: ضیاءالدین نبوی; born 21 December 1983), also known as Zia Nabavi, is an Iranian student activist. He previously served nine years of a 10-year sentence on charges of "creating unease in the public mind" before being released in February 2018.

== Student activism ==
Nabavi studied engineering at Noshirvani University of Technology in Babol, where he served on its Central Council of the Islamic Association. In 2007, he was permanently banned from university study for his political activities. Along with other banned students, he formed the Council to Defend the Right to Education to defend their rights to continue attending university.

In June 2009, Nabavi attended one of the "Green Revolution" protests, which disputed the reelection of President Mahmoud Ahmadinejad over opposition candidates Mir-Hossein Mousavi and Mehdi Karroubi. Shortly after, he was arrested at his home along with his cousin, Atefeh Nabavi. He was initially charged with "gathering and colluding against national security"; "propaganda against the system"; "disturbing public order"; and "moharebeh" (enmity against God), as well as accused with being a member of the People’s Mojahedin Organization of Iran, an Iranian dissident group. The charges were later reduced to "creating unease in the public mind", and he was given a sentence of 15 years in prison and 74 lashes. In May 2010, a successful appeal reduced his sentence to ten years.

== Imprisonment ==
Following his trial, Nabavi began serving his sentence at Tehran's Evin Prison along with numerous other student protesters, including Majid Tavakoli and Kouhyar Goudarzi. The International Campaign for Human Rights in Iran published a letter from Nabavi in February 2010 in which he stated that he had been held for 100 days of solitary confinement and "subjected to physical and psychological torture".

In July and August 2010, he joined sixteen other prisoners in a hunger strike to protest Evin's conditions after their families were allegedly assaulted by guards during a visiting day on 26 July. By February 2011, he had been moved to Karoun Prison in Ahvaz, but on 24 February was abruptly withdrawn from the prison, causing Amnesty International to issue an "Urgent Action" that he was at risk for torture.

Amnesty International has declared Nabavi a prisoner of conscience and called for his unconditional release. Human Rights Watch called on the Iranian government "to release the dozens of students who remain in prison on baseless charges, and allow back into the classroom the hundreds of others who are being deprived of their education for political and religious reasons."
