= Babol Noshirvani University of Technology =

University in Babol, Mazandaran province, Iran

Coordinates: 36.56111°N 52.68064°E

- دانشگاه صنعتی نوشیروانی بابل
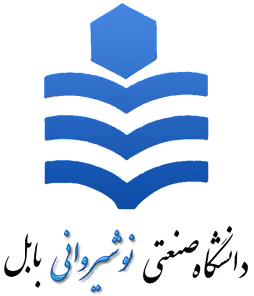
- Former name: Noshirvani Institute of Technology (NIT)
- Type: Public Research Technological University
- Established: 1970
- Chancellor: Prof. Mahmood Rabiee
- Faculty: 200
- Students: 6,000
- Undergraduates: 4,000
- Postgraduates: 2,000
- Location: Babol, Mazandaran, Iran
- Campus: Urban, 11 hectares
- Website: http://en.nit.ac.ir/

Babol Noshirvani University of Technology (BNUT), sometimes also referred to as Noshirvani Institute of Technology or NIT, is a public research university and Institute of Technology in Babol, Mazandaran province in the north of Iran, 20 km (12 mi) south of the Caspian Sea. The university is an influential center for academic research in Iran, due to which it has been consistently ranked among the top 10 schools in the country.

BNUT is home to nearly 200 faculty members and 6,000 undergraduate and graduate students, and is organized into six following faculties, all of which emphasize on science and technology:

- Science
- Chemical Engineering
- Civil Engineering
- Electrical and Computer Engineering
- Materials and Industrial Engineering
- Mechanical Engineering

== History ==
Babol Noshirvani University of Technology was established in 1970 by Seyed Hossein Fallah Noshirvani, who dedicated the complex to the people of Babol as a public engineering school. However, during the early years, the complex served primarily as a training center for technical instructors who would teach at community colleges in fields related to engineering. After the Iranian revolution in 1979, the school merged with the University of Mazandaran (UMZ) to become a College of Engineering and changed its curriculum to offer undergraduate and graduate degree programs in engineering. In 2005, following public demand and supported by donations from people of Babol, the institution started a process of independence from UMZ, during which it was temporarily referred to as “Noshirvani Technical and Education Complex”. Since March 2008, BNUT has been an independent public university under the Iranian Ministry of Science, Research, and Technology.

== Ranking ==
University rankings
- Babol Noshirvani University of Technology

Global – Overall
- CWTS World: 1,010 (2020)
- THE World: 351–400 (2021)
- USNWR Global: 639 (2021)

Regional – Overall
- QS Asia: =302 (2025)

According to Times higher education world university ranking 2018, Babol Noshirvani University of Technology has been ranked among the best in Iran and 301–350th in the world. Moreover, it has been ranked 201–250th in the engineering category. The Times Higher Education Young University Rankings (aged 50 years or under) has announced Babol Noshirvani University of Technology as the 55th young university of the world.

According to ShanghaiRanking's Global Ranking of Academic Subjects 2019, BNUT has been ranked 101–150 among world universities in Mechanical Engineering and also 201–300 in Chemical Engineering.

In 2018, SciVisions University Ranking, Noshirvani University of Technology took 2nd place among all Iranian universities after University of Tehran.

Round University Ranking (RUR) has ranked Babol Noshirvani University of Technology as the 6th university of Iran and 506th among world universities in 2018.

In 2018 ShanghaiRanking's ranking BNUT stands as the 7th university of Iran.

In 2019, the U.S. News & World Report ranked BNUT Engineering Sciences 231st among world universities.

Babol Noshirvani University of Technology stands as the 11th university of the country and 584th among world universities according to 2016 SCImago institutions rankings.

Thomson Reuters ISI Web of Science announces a list of world's most effective universities every year. BNUT has been ranked as the 6th top university of technology in the country among top 1% universities of the world in June 2015.

Islamic World Science Citation Database (ISC) has announced a list of most effective universities of Iran based on scientific diplomacy in 2012–2014. Babol Noshirvani university of technology has been ranked 3rd among all the technical universities of Iran in such field after Isfahan university of technology and Sharif university of technology.

Islamic World Science Citation Database (ISC) has published the Ranking Universities and research Centers of Iran 2014–15, Babol Noshirvani university of technology has been ranked 6th among all technical universities of Iran after Amirkabir University of Technology, Sharif University of Technology, Iran University of Science and Technology, Isfahan University of Technology and khaje nasir toosi.

== Administration ==
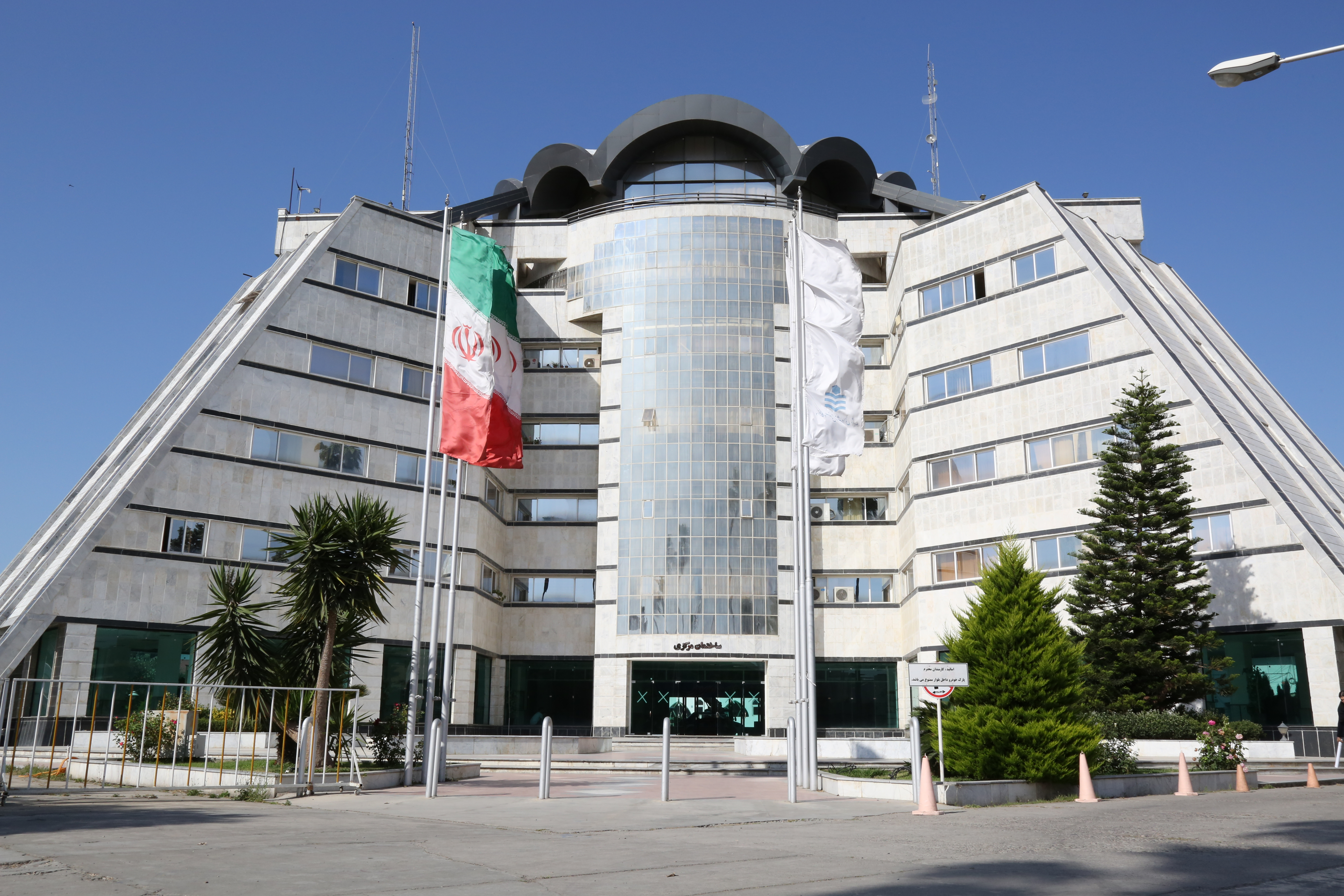
University Administration Building

Chancellor: Mahmood Rabiee, Professor of Biomedical Engineering, since 2025

- Vice-Chancellor for University: Kurosh Sedighi, Associate Professor of Mechanical Engineering
- Chancellor of International Campus: Mousa Farhadi, Professor of Mechanical Engineering
- Vice-Chancellor for Education: Mohammad Bakhshi Jooybari, Professor of Mechanical Engineering
- Vice-Chancellor for Research and Technology: Majid Taghizadeh, Associate Professor of Chemical Engineering
- Vice-Chancellor for Administrative and Financial: Sayyed Hashem Rasouli, Assistant Professor of Mathematics
- Vice-Chancellor for Student: Mohammad Reza Hassanzadeh, Assistant Professor of Electrical Engineering
- Vice-Chancellor for Cultural and Social: Abolfazl Ranjbar Noei, Professor of Electrical Engineering

== Schools ==
Major faculties of the university:

=== Department of Science ===
In this department, There are several undergraduate and graduate programs in Chemistry, Mathematics and Physics.

- Master of Science programs:

- Analytical Chemistry and Organic Chemistry

- Physics

- Mathematics

- Research Labs in Science department:

- Analytical chemistry Lab

- Organic chemistry Lab

- Laser Lab

-Department faculty: 10 Associate professors and 17 Assistant Professors.

=== Chemical Engineering ===
- Dean of Faculty: Assoc. Prof. Ahmad Rahimpour
- Academic staff: three professors, four associate professors, 10 assistant professors, 1 lecturer
- BSc in Chemical Eng (Process design and Food Ind.)
- MSc in Chemical Eng (Advanced Chemical Eng, Separation process and Thermodynamics)
- PhD in Chemical Eng (Biotechnology and Chemical Eng)

==== Educational fields ====
B.S. (Level)

  - Chemical Engineering (Designing Process of Oil Industries)
  - Chemical Engineering (Food industries)

M.S. (Level): Advanced Chemical Engineering

PhD (Level)

  - Chemical Engineering (General)
  - Chemical Engineering (Biotechnology)

Academic groups :

  - Food Industries and Biotechnology
  - Oil and Gas

=== Civil Engineering ===
The School of Civil Engineering admits students at undergraduate, masters, and PhD levels.

- Dean: Dr. Gholamreza Abdollahzadeh
- Academic staff: 2 professors, 12 Associate professors, 14 Assistant Professors, and 7 lecturers.

Educational fields : B.S.:

- Civil Engineering (Civil)
- Civil Engineering (Surveying)

M.S.:

- Structural Engineering
- Earthquake Engineering
- Soil Mechanics and Foundation Engineering
- Transportation and Highway Engineering
- Hydraulic Structures
- Environmental Engineering
- Water Engineering
- Offshore Engineering
- Marine Structures

PhD:

- Structural Engineering
- Earthquake Engineering
- Soil Mechanics and Foundation Engineering
- Transportation and Highway Engineering
- Hydraulic Structures
- Environmental Engineering

=== Electrical and Computer Engineering ===
This school is one of the academic centers in the country with academic staffs and 17 focused laboratories. Each year, many research and industrial projects in application areas stage to be implemented by academic members and students in this college. Currently, this school is attempting to organize new student's admission continuously in undergraduate, master and PhD. Electrical and Computer Engineering department is well known for its scientific breakthroughs, it can be seen from number of laboratories, industrial projects, international papers and citations.

- Dean of Faculty: Assist. Prof. Sayed Asghar Gholamian
- Academic staff: 4 Professors, 16 Associate Prof, 38 Assistant Prof, 7 Lecturer, and 10 PhD Candidate
- BSc, MSc and PhD in Electrical Eng ( Control, Communications, Electronics and Power )
- MSc and PhD in Biomedical engineering
- BSc and MSc in Computer Engineering

Educational fields : B.S. (Level) : Electrical Engineering (Electronic) Electrical Engineering (Power) Electrical Engineering (Control) Electrical Engineering (Communications) Computer Engineering (Hardware)

M.S. (Level) :

- Electrical Engineering (Electronic)
- Electrical Engineering (Power)
- Electrical Engineering (Control)
- Electrical Engineering (Communications)
- Bio-medical Engineering (Bio-electric)
- PhD (Level) :

Electrical Engineering Electrical Engineering (Communications) Bio-medical Engineering (Bio-electric)

- Academic groups :
- Power
- Electronics
- Control
- Computer
- Communications
- Bio-medical Engineering

=== Mechanical Engineering ===
Currently, the School of Mechanical Engineering is attempting to organize new student s admission continuously in undergraduate, master and PhD. Holding two conferences about Fluid Dynamics and Manufacturing Dynamics, 126 ISI articles and 56 scientific research and 100 conferences articles and 10 applied research projects are achievements of this college in the past year (2009).

- Dean of Faculty: Assist. Prof. Mohammad hassan Ghasemi
- Academic staff:7 Professor, 10 Associate Prof, 23 Assistant Prof, 2 Lecturer and 1 PhD Candidate
- BSc, MSc and PhD in Mechanical Eng ( Thermo fluids, Manufacturing and Applied Design ) and Materials Science and Engineering
- BSc and MSc in Industrial Engineering
- MSc in Naval Architect Engineering

Educational fields: B.S. (Level) :

- Mechanical Engineering (Solids)
- Mechanical Engineering (Thermofluids)
- Mechanical Engineering (Manufacturing)
- Industrial Engineering (Industrial Technology)

M.S. (Level):

- Mechanical Engineering (Applied Design)
- Mechanical Engineering (Energy Conversion)
- Mechanical Engineering (Manufacturing)
- Mechanical Engineering (Recognition and Selection of Materials)

PhD (Level) :

- Mechanical Engineering (Applied Design)
- Mechanical Engineering (Energy Conversion)
- Mechanical Engineering (Manufacturing)

Islamic Culture Group

- Head of Group: Assist. Prof. S. Hassan Aghababaei
- Academic staff: fourAssistant Professor

== Nanotechnology Research Institute ==
- Head of Institute: Prof. Mohsen Jahanshahi
- Researchers: Six professors, seven associate professors, eight assistant professors and 20 postgruadute students
- In 2018, the Nanotechnology Research Institute Telegram bot, designed as the only specialized nanotechnology bot by Hafez Raei, a member of the Nanotechnology Research Institute.
- In 2019, the Nanotechnology Research Institute was chosen as the excellence center of nanotechnology in the water and Dr. Mohsen Jahanshahi was elected chairman of the excellence center.

== Student activism ==
Student activist Sayed Ziaoddin Nabavi attended the university as an engineering student before being banned from higher education for his anti-government political activities. Along with other banned students, he formed the Council to Defend the Right to Education to defend their rights to continue attending university. Following his participation in "Green Revolution" protests following President Mahmoud Ahmadinejad's disputed reelection, Sayed Ziaoddin Nabavi was arrested along with his wife, and he is currently serving a ten-year prison sentence on charges of "creating unease in the public mind".

== See also ==
- Higher education in Iran
- University of Mazandaran
- Golestan University
- University of Guilan
