= Sylvia Aguilera García =

Mexican peace activist

- Born: 1974 (age 51–52); Mexico City
- Other name: Sylvia Aguilera
- Education: Universidad Autonoma Metropolitana, University of Bradford, Yale University
- Employer: National Human Rights Commission (Mexico)
- Organization: Inter-American Commission on Human Rights
- Known for: Peace activism

Sylvia Aguilera García, sometimes, Sylvia Aguilera (born 1974) is a Mexican peace activist, the former executive director of the National Human Rights Commission, and a Yale World Fellow.

She has advocated for legislation to protect the victims of crime and for the release of former military leader José Francisco Gallardo Rodríguez.

== Early life and education ==
Aguilera was born in Mexico City in 1974.

She has a bachelor's degree in social psychology from the Universidad Autonoma Metropolitana and a master's degree in peace studies from England's University of Bradford.

== Career and activism ==
Aguilera has been a peace activist since she left university. Her work focusses on conflict resolution in Mexico, especially around human rights, land management, civil society engagement, and conflict mediation.

Since 2013, she has been a consultant to the Inter-American Commission of Human Rights. She is the executive director of Acento, Acción Local, a Mexican organisation that provides financial support to community efforts towards social justice and human rights. She was previously the director of Mexico's National Human Rights Commission and the executive director of the Centro de Colaboración Cívica, from 2012 to 2018. In 2018, she became a Yale World Fellow.

In 2011, she advocated for legislation to support the victims of crime. In 2016, she was the leader of calls against forced disappearances and resolution for the families of those disappeared. While working at the National Human Rights Commission, she called for the release of José Francisco Gallardo Rodríguez, a military general and academic who was imprisoned after proposing the creation of a military ombudsman.

== Personal life ==
Aguilera has children, including a daughter who was aged 8 in 2016.
