= Hossein Fallah Noshirvani =

Iranian businessman and philanthropist

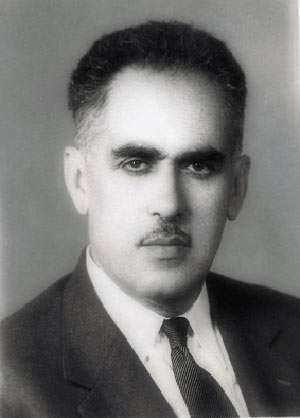
Hossein Fallah Noshiravani

Hossein Fallah Noshirvani (Persian: حسین فلاح نوشیروانی) was an Iranian businessman, philanthropist, and founder of the Babol Noshirvani University of Technology. He is famed for leaving the entirety of his wealth to charity following his death.

== Biography ==
Noshiravani was born in 1902 in Babol, Mazandaran to a prominent family. Following his education, he moved to Mashhad, Khorasan-e Razavi Province to begin an apprenticeship under Hakimzadeh Yazdi. As a businessman he would later become a leading figure in Iran's cotton and steel industries.

Noshirvani is famed for his philanthropic endeavours, and particularly his role in the development of the Mazandaran through the construction of multiple bridges, hospitals, schools, and multiple other social service institutions. He was a strong advocate and supporter of women's education in Iran. He also invested a significant portion of his wealth towards the development of rural health services in Iran.

== Babol Noshirvani University of Technology ==
In 1970, Noshirvani founded the Babol Noshirvani University of Technology, an influential centre for academic research in Iran. In 2016, the school was ranked 1st among all Iranian universities by Times Higher Education (THE) World University Rankings.

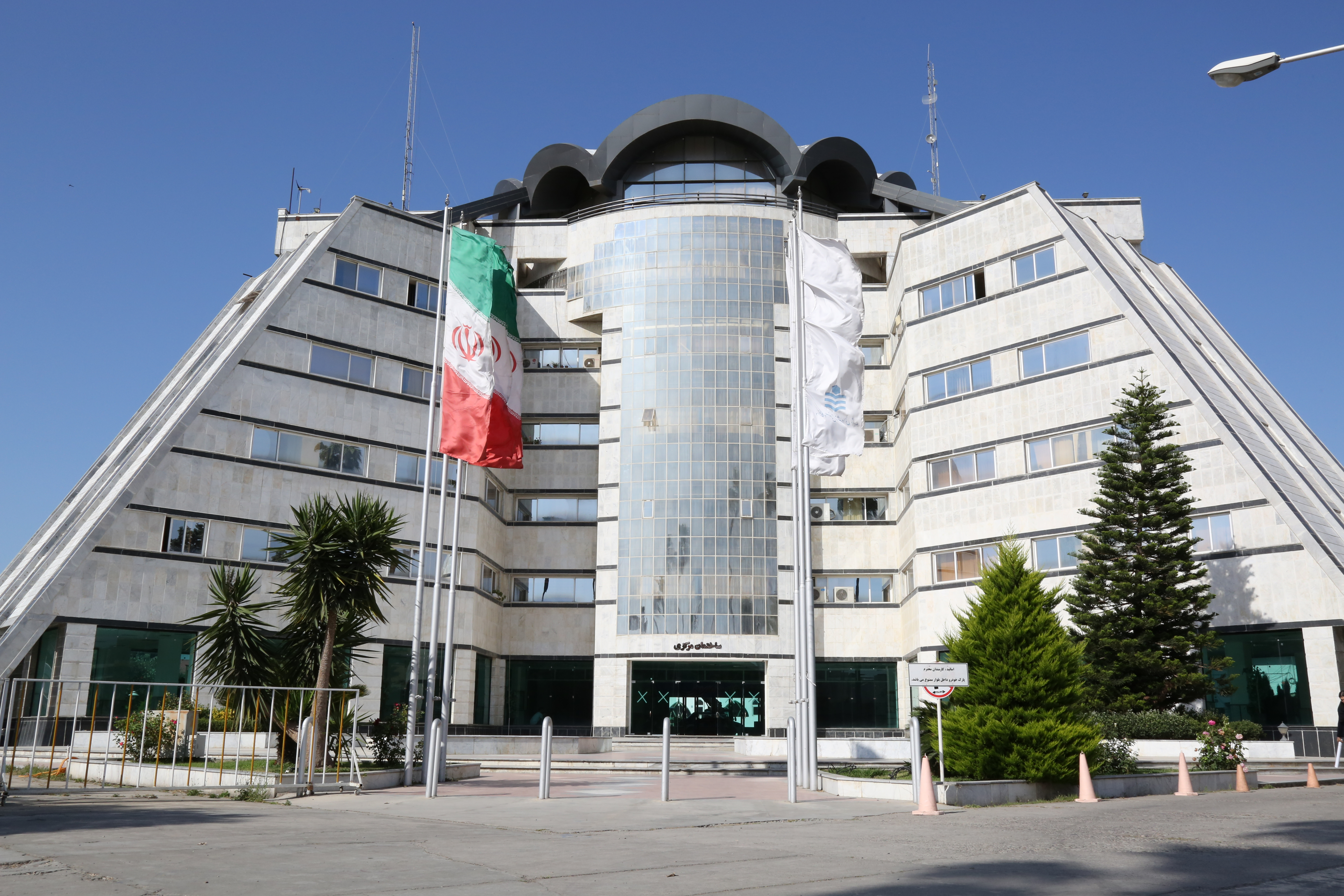
Babol Noshiravani University of Technology

The institution initially began as a community college for technical training in fields related to engineering. After the 1979 Iranian Revolution, the school merged with the University of Mazandaran (UMZ), becoming its College of Engineering with a curriculum that included both undergraduate and graduate programmes. In 2005, the institution started a process of independence from UMZ, during which it was temporarily referred to as the Noshirvani Technical and Education Complex. In 2008, BNUT became an independent public university.

Since 2018, Time Higher Education has ranked BNUT first in Iran. In 2020, it was ranked 74th among the world among young universities (less than 50 years old).
