= Guo Xiaojun =

Chinese Falun Gong practitioner

Guo Xiaojun (Chinese: 郭小军; pinyin: Guō Xiǎojūn) is a Chinese university lecturer and practitioner of Falun Gong who has twice been imprisoned by the government of the People's Republic of China on charges of "using a heretical organization to subvert the law". Amnesty International considers him a prisoner of conscience.

== First arrest ==
At the time of his first arrest, Guo worked as a lecturer at Shanghai Jiao Tong University in Shanghai, in the Department of Electronics and Information Science. In 2001, he was arrested by the Chinese government for distributing Falun Gong literature, following the 1999 ban on the religion by the Chinese government. He was imprisoned in a labor camp until 2004.

== Second arrest ==
On 7 January 2010, Guo was arrested without a warrant at his home in Shanghai by eight plainclothes police officers. According to Guo's wife Xu Wenxin, one officer shoved Guo to the ground, cutting his head. His home was searched, and his cell phone, laptop computer, books, and other items were confiscated by the arresting officers. He was then taken to the Shanghai Baoshan District Detention Center. On 18 January, Guo's interrogation began. He alleges that he was deprived of sleep and food, and that his interrogators threatened to arrest Xu Wenxin, who is also a Falun Gong practitioner, unless Guo signed a confession. Guo signed a statement agreeing that he was guilty of the charge of using a heretical organization to subvert the law.

In the course of Guo's legal case, his family hired five successive lawyers, each of which withdrew following alleged government pressure. One lawyer reported that he was told by the Beijing Judicial Bureau that he would be disbarred if he chose to defend Guo. On 7 July 2010, Guo was convicted on the basis of his confession and sentenced to four years' imprisonment; because his current lawyer was not informed by authorities of the date of the hearing, Guo had no legal representation at his trial. Guo stated after the verdict that he wished to retract his confession, reiterating his claim that it was obtained through torture, but the judge prevented him from finishing his statement.

In March 2011, Amnesty International reported that Guo was suffering from a "serious eye condition" for which prison authorities were denying him treatment.

== International reaction ==
Amnesty International designated Guo Xiaojun a "prisoner of conscience", "imprisoned solely because of his beliefs", and launched multiple international letter-writing campaigns on his behalf. The US State Department listed his imprisonment as an "abuse of religious freedom" in its 2010 International Religious Freedom Report. Charles Tannock of the European Parliament raised his case with the EP Commission for Human Rights, which in turn called on the Chinese government "to respect the freedom of religious belief and practice". The United Nations Special Rapporteur on freedom of religion or belief, Heiner Bielefeldt, submitted Guo's allegations to the Chinese authorities in his 2011 report, noting the "continued violations of freedom of religion or belief suffered by Falun Gong practitioners in China". The Chinese government declined to reply.
