= Saleh al-Ashwan =

Saudi Arabian human rights activist

- Occupation: Member of the Saudi Civil and Political Rights Association
- Known for: Advocating for the release of political prisoners and greater respect for human rights in Saudi Arabia
- Criminal charge: Defending women's rights
- Criminal penalty: Five years in prison and a five-year ban on travel abroad
- Criminal status: Currently held in Al-Ha’ir prison south of Riyadh

Saleh al-Ashwan (Arabic: صالح الأشوان) is a member of the Saudi Civil and Political Rights Association, an organization that has advocated for the release of political prisoners and greater respect for human rights in Saudi Arabia and that was banned in March 2013. Saudi authorities arrested al-Ashwan in July 2012 for defending women's rights and held him without trial or access to lawyers for nearly four years, while confiscating his electronic devices. During his first two months of detention he was held incommunicado and Saudi activists allege that he was tortured, beaten, as well as stripped and suspended by his limbs from the ceiling of an interrogation room. In 2016 a Saudi court sentenced al-Ashwan to five years in prison and a five-year ban on travel abroad. He is currently held in al-Ha’ir prison south of Riyadh. Due to these abuses, he is considered to be a prisoner of conscience by Amnesty International.
