= Yusak Pakage =

Indonesian activist

- Born: c. 1979 (age 46–47)
- Organization: Parlemen Jalanan
- Known for: Papuan independence activism; 2005–2010 imprisonment

Yusak Pakage (born c. 1979) is an Indonesian activist for Papuan independence, best known for his 2005–2010 imprisonment for raising the pro-independence Morning Star flag.

== Flag-raising incident ==
The Morning Star flag, used by supporters of Papuan independence

In December 2004, at the age of 26, Pakage and activist Filep Karma raised the Morning Star flag at a rally of 200 people outside of Abepura, Papua Province. According to Amnesty International, police then fired on the crowd and advanced with batons, arresting Karma. Pakage later protested Karma's arrest at the police station and was arrested himself.

In January 2005, Pakage and Karma were on trial for treason before the Jayapura District Court. The prosecutor accused Pakage of having "damaged the sovereignty of Indonesia". In May, Papuan independence supporters clashed with police outside the courthouse, throwing bottles and rocks while police fought the crowd with batons. The police commander in charge of the operation was found guilty of human rights violations and replaced several days after the incident.

At the conclusion of the trial, Pakage was sentenced to ten years' imprisonment, while Karma was sentenced to fifteen years. On 24 August 2005, Pakage briefly escaped from custody while under escort to fetch a book from his home. He was recaptured several hours later at the office of the NGO Elsham Papua. Several international human rights organizations protested on behalf of Pakage and Karma, including Amnesty International, which designated them as prisoners of conscience, and Human Rights Watch, which called them political prisoners and urged their immediate release.

In August 2008, 40 members of the US Congress sent a letter to Indonesia calling for Pakage and Karma's release, in response to which a 100-person rally protested in front of the US Embassy in Jakarta. The Indonesian government rejected the request; Demianus Rumbiak of the Papuan division of the Ministry of Law and Human Rights stated that the US Congress had no right to interfere with Indonesia's domestic issues, stating that Pakage's arrest was not a human rights issue as he had been incarcerated for violating Indonesia's positive law. However, later Pakage was one of 457 Papuan prisoners granted a reduction in his term, receiving three months clemency.

Pakage and Karma's arrest were the subject of further protests in front of the Indonesian embassy in Washington, D.C., in 2009. President Susilo Bambang Yudhoyono pardoned Pakage in mid-2010, and he was released from prison on 8 July. Human Rights Watch released a statement praising the release but also calling for remaining Indonesian political prisoners to be freed.

== Later activity ==
Pakage continued his activism after his release, becoming the coordinator of Parlemen Jalanan ("Street Parliament"), which advocated on behalf of Papuan prisoners. In May 2012, Pakage and the Free Papua Movement announced that they would hold another ceremony to raise the Morning Star flag.

On 23 July 2012, Pakage was arrested again for having a penknife in his bag while observing the trial of fellow activist Buchtar Tabuni, who was charged with organizing violent protests. Pakage was charged with "possession of a weapon", which carries a maximum sentence of ten years' imprisonment. According to Amnesty International, he was still being denied access to a lawyer as of 24 August, and had been reportedly threatened with physical abuse by police.
