= Shibal Ibrahim =

- Born: c. 1977
- Occupation: Kurdish rights activist
- Organization: Union of Young Kurds in Syria
- Known for: 2011 imprisonment

Shibal Ibrahim (Arabic: شبال إبراهيم) (born c. 1977) is an activist for Kurdish rights in Qamishly, Syria. He is a member of the Union of Young Kurds in Syria, a group which organizes pro-reform protests in predominantly Kurdish areas.

On 22 September 2011, Ibrahim was arrested at his family home by plainclothes security officers and is being held incommunicado. His family alleges that marks on his body indicate that he was tortured while in custody.

In January 2012, Amnesty International designated him a prisoner of conscience "detained solely for his activism", called for his immediate release, and launched a letter-writing campaign on his behalf. His arrest was also protested by the Committees for the Defense of Freedoms and Human Rights in Syria.
