= Nikolay Kavkazsky =

Russian activist

- Николай Кавказский
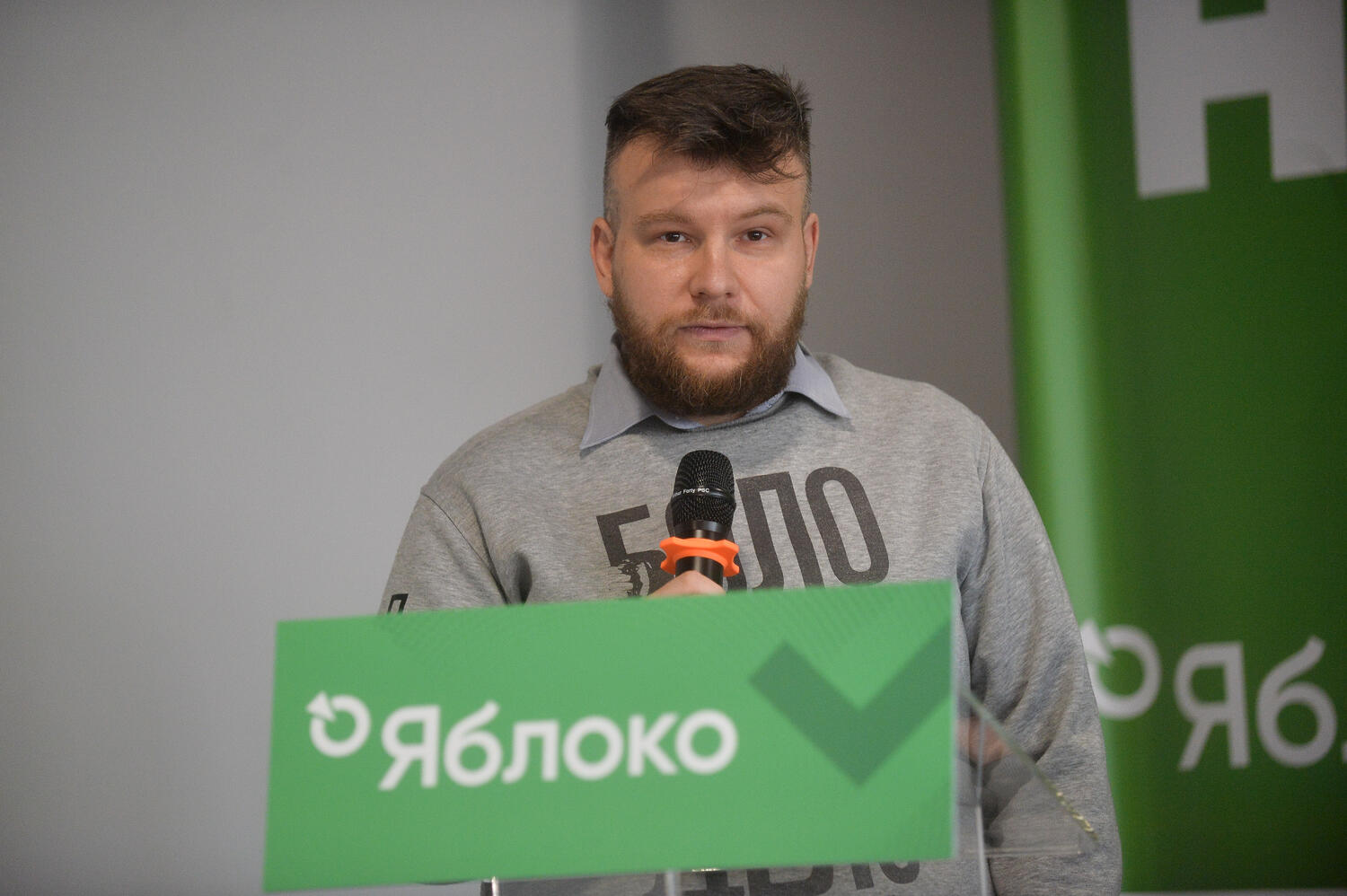
- Kavkazsky in 2022

Personal details
- Born: Nikolay Yurievich Kavkazsky; October 16, 1986 (age 40) Moscow, Russian SFSR
- Citizenship: Russian Federation
- Party: Yabloko
- Other political affiliations: Left Socialist Action
- Website: http://www.kavkazsky.com

Nikolay Yurievich Kavkazsky (Russian: Николай Юрьевич Кавказский; born October 16, 1986) is a Russian political, LGBT and drug policy reform activist, lawyer, member of numerous human rights organizations, blogger and a political prisoner.

== Political career ==
Nikolay Kavkazsky was born on October 16, 1986. Since his early childhood, he was inspired by the ideas of justice, equality and peaceful resolution of conflict.

In 2007–2012, 2013 - till now he is an active member of the pro-western democratic Yabloko party. In 2008, gained 18% of the votes as the party's regional branch's vice chairman candidate.

- Since 2008 – an activist of the “Left Socialist Action” movement
- 2008-2010 – one of the leaders of the “Left Front” movement
- In 2010-2011 - he held the post of the Moscow regional council of the “Youth Yabloko” branch
- 2010 – a member of the “Solidarity” movement
- 2011 – ran for the federal parliamentary elections as a candidate of the “Yabloko” Party
- 2011-2012 - an assistant to the chairman of the Moscow “Youth Yabloko” Committee
- Since 2010 – an active member of the human rights organization “The Committee for the Civil Rights”. He was remarkably active at the Prison visitation department of the Civil rights committee, working with former convicts, maintaining correspondence with the incarcerated and providing psychological support to their families.
- Since 2012-2013 – a member of the main board of the Working Poor Union

He has been actively involved in the Russian protest movement and authored numerous political articles. He also defended Pussy Riot and other activists.

He has also defended the rights of ethnic, religious, and sexual minorities and promoted the idea of peaceful resistance to oppression.

== Arrest ==
On May 6, 2012, Nikolay Kavkazsky took part in the “March of the Million” demonstration organized by the opposition and its supporters on the Bolotnaya Square in Moscow to protest the results of the presidential elections held on March 4. Those demonstrations were brutally stopped by the police and later led to a severe crackdown on the democratic movement.

The prominent sociologist, historian, and civil activist Alek D. Epstein published an article about Nikolay Kavkazsky and included his diary entries related to the events. They show that the participants of the demonstration who had peaceful intentions were brutally attacked by the police, and some suffered grave injuries: “I’ve never seen such a mess! I got clubbed by the special unit policemen a couple of times myself … I saw a lot of wounded and bleeding people…”... Nikolay Kavkazsky's diary serves as a unique source of information on the 2012 protests providing an “inside” perspective. “The March Of the Millions. The Blooded Sunday. Alek Epstein. The Captivity, November 2012.

On July 25th Nikolay Kavkazsky was arrested in his own house for allegedly pushing a policeman during the demonstration (which was interpreted by the prosecution as an attempt to inflict grave bodily harm).

On July 26th the representative for the Investigation Committee brought the charges of assaulting a representative of the authorities (part 1 of Article 318 of the Russian Criminal Code) and participating in a massive riot (part 2 of Article 212 of the Russian Criminal Code).

Thus, Nikolay Kavkazsky became one of the main figures in the “Bolotnaya Square” case.

The prosecution claimed to have discovered evidence (a videotape) proving that he had taken illegal actions against the police during the demonstration, although they did not present it. On July 25 Nikolay Kavkazsky was remanded until September 24, and then his arrest was extended until November when he was finally remanded until March 6, though he suffers from some serious health problems. As of today, he is still awaiting his trial.

== Struggle for human rights in prison ==
Even in detention, Nikolay Kavkazsky is pursuing his political activities and his struggle for human rights. In November, he published an article criticizing the inhumane living conditions and unfair treatment that the inmates are exposed to and suggested a number of measures intended to make life in prison at least a little more tolerable. For instance, he wrote:

“Prisons in Russia could not guarantee the respect of human rights. On the contrary, the living conditions in the correctional institutions disparage the human dignity of a person and strip them of their legal right to a normal life.

I would like to remind those who may think that criminals should have no rights (although such an attitude is completely unacceptable for a civilized person), that in Russia there is an enormous number of completely innocent people who suffer behind bars, and even in the most advanced countries there are always innocent prisoners since court and prosecution mistakes are always possible. … I hope that in a humane society there will be no such institution as a prison. However, we live in the present rather than in the future, and it means that we have to deal with the existing problems. From my perspective, we cannot abolish prisons by a decree, so we have to reform them.“ Then he describes the appalling living conditions in prison including lack of light, harsh discipline, unbearable transportation measures, poor food quality, overcrowdedness and other urgent problems and elaborates on some possible improvements.

== Elections to the Moscow City Duma of the 6th convocation ==
Nikolai participated in the elections to the Moscow City Duma of the 6th convocation as a Yabloko candidate. He came third out of seven candidates in the electoral district and gained 12,78 percent.

== Municipal elections 2015-2017 ==
As a candidate from the Yabloko party Nikolay Kavkazsky participated in municipal elections were held in 2015 and 2017. He came 5th out of all candidates in Northern Medvedkovo district in 2015 and gained 14,61 percent. He came 7th out of all candidates in Basmanny district in 2017 and gained 24,89 percent.

== Elections to the State Duma of the 8th convocation ==
In 2021 Nikolay Kavkazsky was nominated by Yabloko party as a candidate for the State Duma of the Russian Federation. “Against Putin” was his campaign slogan. Police numerously visited Nikolay at the time of the campaign so according to Nikolay the voters were afraid to take the leaflets. On September 12 Nikolay Kavkazsky and three members of his election headquarter were arrested because of the election banner with the campaign slogan but all the arrested people were released without further investigation. The unknown person stole the leaflets from the election headquarter of Nikolay Kavkazsky. Nikolay submitted the crime report but the criminal is still not found. Finally Nikolay Kavkazsky was not elected as a deputy of the State Duma.

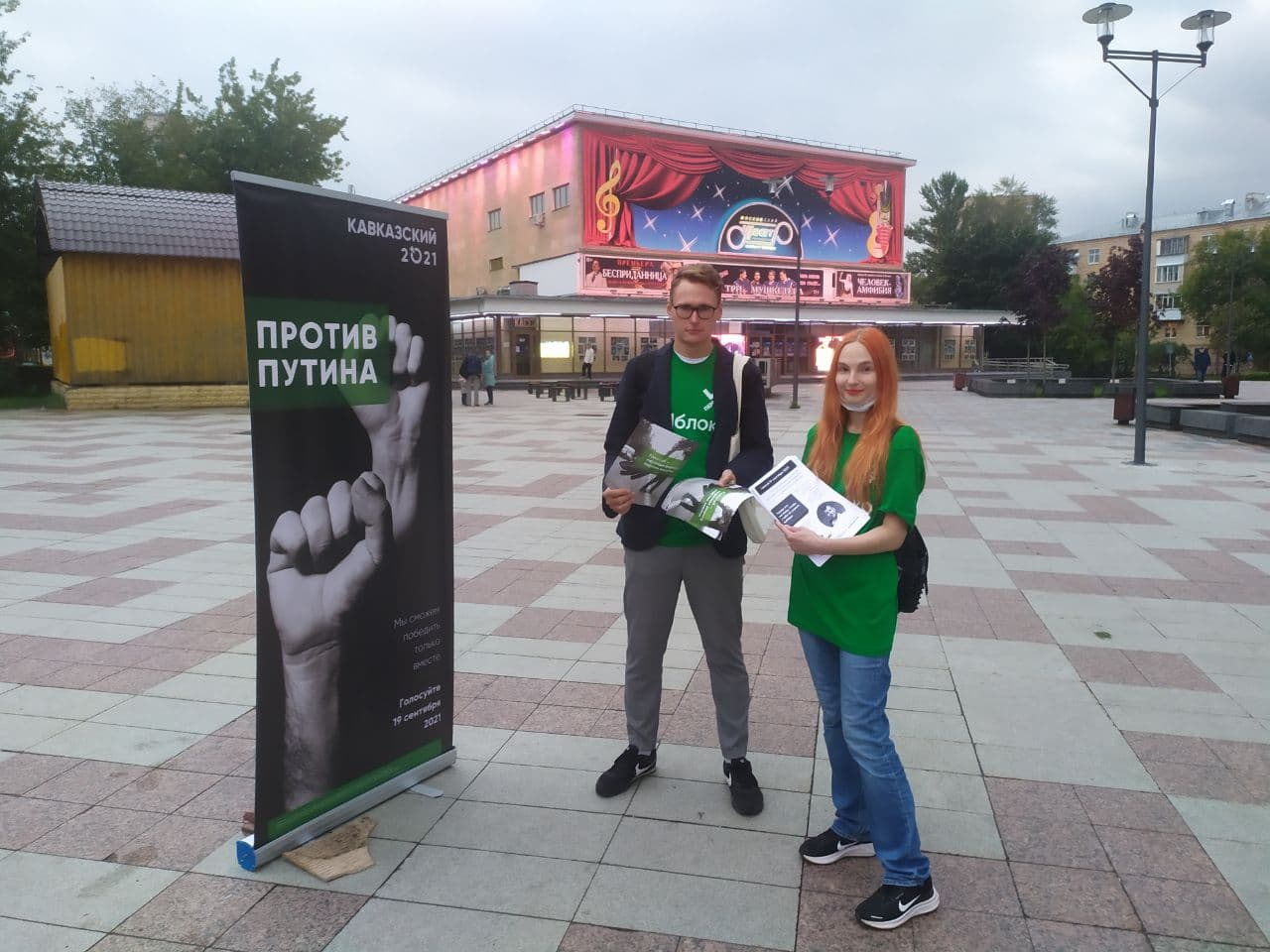
Canvassing for Nikolay Kavkazsky in Ryazansky district of Moscow

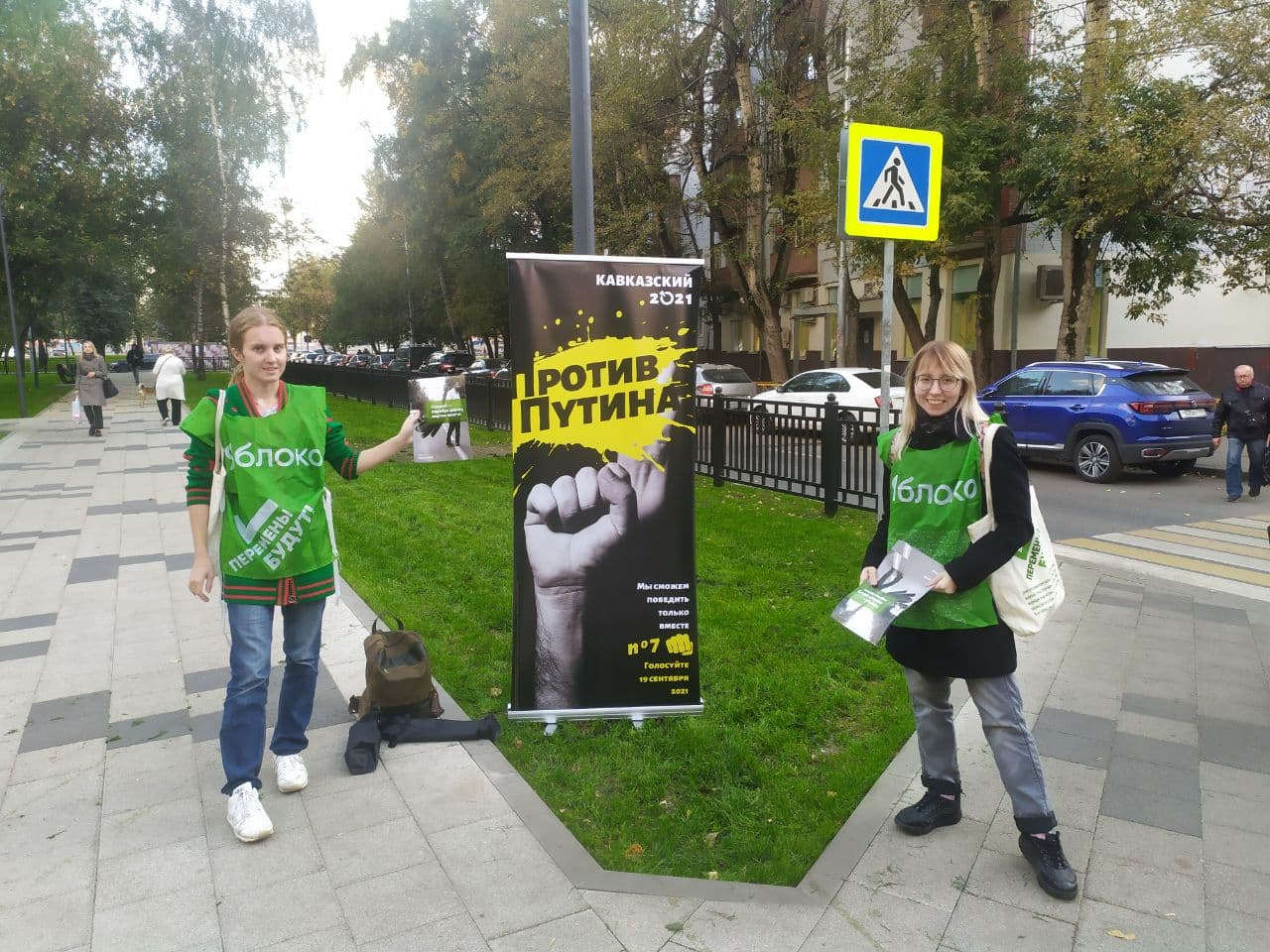
Canvassing for Nikolay Kavkazsky in Tekstilshchiki district of Moscow

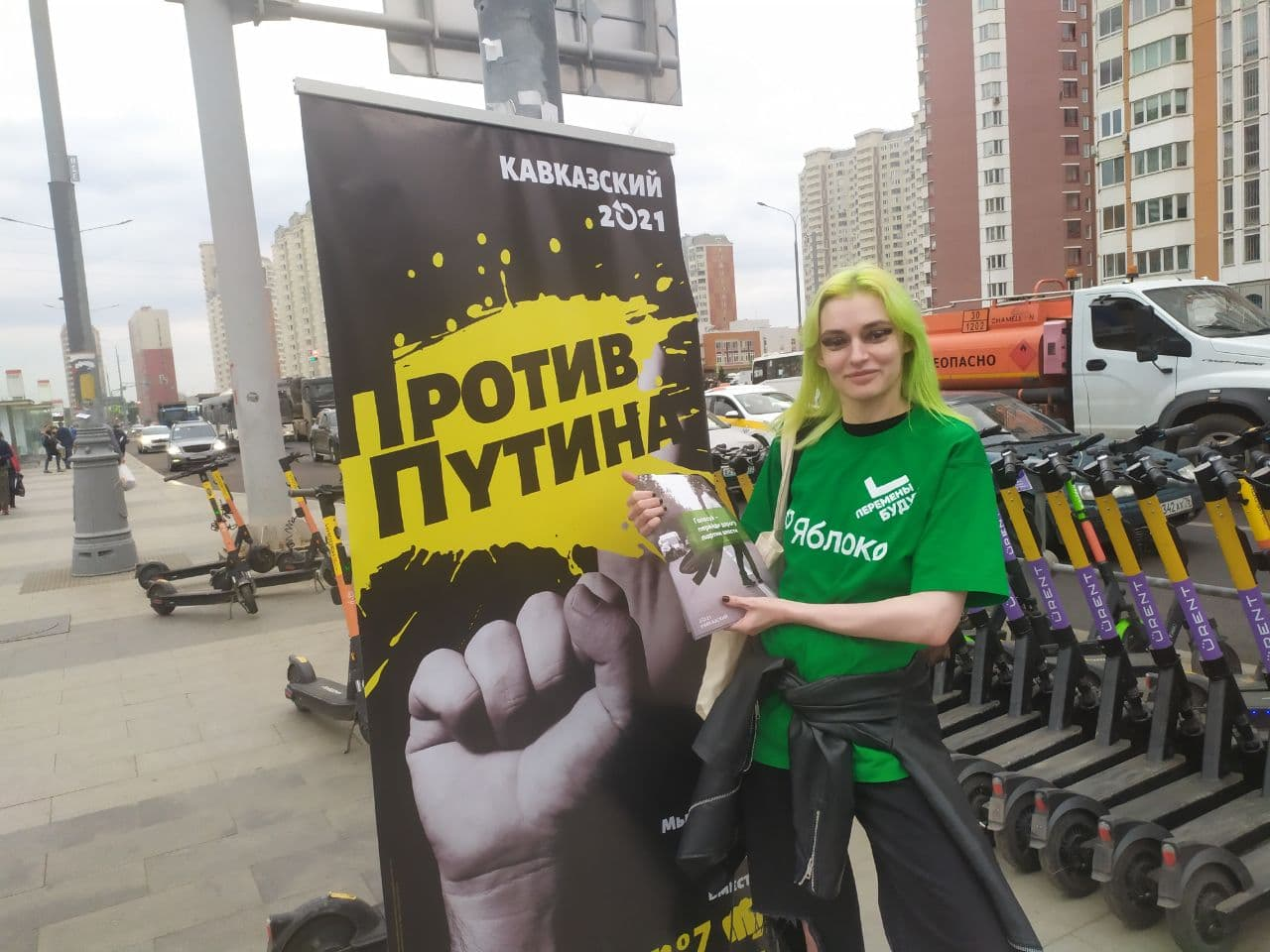
Canvassing for Nikolay Kavkazsky in Nekrasovka district of Moscow

== Municipal elections 2022 ==
In 2022 Nikolay Kavkazsky planned to become a candidate in municipal elections in Basmanny district but he was arrested and spent 10 days in imprisonment because of his post in social network dated by 2021. In this post Nikolay wrote about Smart Voting so he was found guilty in commitment an administrative offense and lost his right to be elected. Yabloko party considers the arrest of Nikolay Kavkazsky as an act of political repression. Anyway Nikolay Kavkazsky helped the Yabloko team in Basmanny district during the municipal elections.

== Political views ==
In terms of political views Nikolay Kavkazsky defines himself as a democratic socialist. Nikolay supports the progressive scale of taxation and a social state. Nikolay Kavkazsky supports the position of Yabloko party against the invasion of Ukraine by Russian forces. He is also against conscription army and supports the peaceful resolution of conflicts. Nikolay Kavkazsky supports political prisoners and promotes the defence of human rights focusing on vulnerable groups (such as women, LGBT people and polyamorists). In 2022 Nikolay opposed the new laws against LGBT community adopted in Russia. He also raised the legal problems polyamorists from Russia face because of the wave of relocation from the country. Nikolay promotes drug policy reform telling the people who consume drugs are the victims of violence against vulnerable group and there is also the practice of using drugs in police abuse. According to migration issues Nikolay says that “there are no illegal people”.

== See also ==
- 2011-2012 Russian protests
