= Ramin Bayramov =

Azerbaijani journalist

Ramin Bayramov is an Azerbaijani journalist. Radio Free Europe described him in 2011 as a "prominent Islamic activist".

On 11 August 2011, he was arrested by Azerbaijani authorities. Police stated that they found a pistol, a hand grenade, and drugs in a search of his home. The following day, the National Security Ministry announced that he was arrested on suspicion of "treason, breach of national security and the incitement of mass unrest". However, these charges were not filed, and he was instead charged with possession of drugs and an illegal firearm. In March, Bayramov was sentenced to eighteen months' imprisonment.

Amnesty International described the charges as "politically motivated" and "trumped up by Azerbaijan’s secular authorities in order to silence [his] coverage of religious issues". The organization designated Bayramov a prisoner of conscience. Human Rights Watch called the charges "spurious". Reporters Without Borders noted its "dismay", stating, "In all likelihood, Ramin Bayramov is the latest victim of the crackdown striking religious circles and pro-Iranian Azerbaijan."

== See also ==
- islamazeri.com
