= Atefeh Riazi =

American technologist and public administrator

Atefeh Riazi is an American technologist and public administrator. She is the Senior Vice President and the CIO of [( Hearst Corp)] responsible for the overall technology strategy and operations. Prior to this role she was the CIO of the Memorial Sloan Kettering Cancer Center Chief Information Officer, where she developed and implemented an enterprise-wide, long-term strategic information technology (IT) plan and oversaw the integration of data and technology resources across the organization.

Prior to that, she was the United Nations' Chief Information Technology Officer, Assistant Secretary-General, Office of Information and Communications Technology, with responsibility for all of the organization's needs relating to information and communications technology. She was appointed as head of the Office of Information and Communications Technology by United Nations Secretary-General Ban Ki-moon on 9 May 2013.

== Biography ==
After graduating from Stony Brook University with an Electrical Engineering degree, Riazi rose through IT ranks, holding various positions in the public and private sectors. Prior to her appointment at the United Nations, Riazi served as Chief Information Officer and Acting General Manager at the New York City Housing Authority.
