= Kouhyar Goudarzi =

Human rights activist

- Born: May 5, 1986 (age 40)
- Education: Sharif University of Technology
- Occupations: Journalist, Human rights defender, Blogger
- Organization: Committee of Human Rights Reporters (CHRR)
- Known for: human rights activism, 2009 and 2011 arrests
- Awards: John Aubuchon Freedom of the Press Award (2010)

Kouhyar Goudarzi (Persian: کوهیار گودرزی) is an Iranian human rights activist, journalist and blogger who was imprisoned several times by the government of Iran. He previously served as an editor of Radio Zamane. He is a member of Committee of Human Rights Reporters (CHRR), serving as the head from 2005-2009.

== Life ==
Goudarzi was an aerospace engineering student at Sharif University of Technology before being expelled in November 2009 by order of government authorities and barred from continuing his education.

He was detained twice in 2006 during peaceful rallies and three times after the events following the disputed presidential election results of 2009.

Goudarzi was first arrested in March 2006 on International Women's Day as he was taking pictures during a rally with Shiva Nazarahari and they were released soon after. He was detained again in May 2006 on International Workers' Day while attending a Tehran Bus Company rally. He had disclosed to the Associated Press that a political prisoner, Akbar Mohammadi had died in prison after going on hunger strike to protest the lack of proper medical care.

== 2009 arrest ==
Goudarzi was detained a third time in the summer of 2009 during the street protests after the disputed presidential election results, and was released after a short period. He continued to take an active part in the 2009–2010 Iranian election protests, in which he joined other student activists in protesting the disputed victory of Iranian President Mahmoud Ahmadinejad over opposition candidates Mir-Hossein Mousavi and Mehdi Karroubi.

On December 20, 2009 Goudarzi was among a group that was detained by regime forces as they were travelling to the city of Qom to attend the funeral services of the senior dissident cleric Ayatollah Montazeri. Goudarzi had reportedly angered Iranian authorities due to his human rights work and contents in his blog specifically asking for the release of jailed members of Committee of Human Rights Reporters (CHRR).

Goudarzi and other members of Committee of Human Rights Reporters were put under heavy pressure through physical and psychological intimidation while in custody, to shut down the group's website. Goudarzi was denied access to his lawyer or his case file and was further harassed by being barred from visitation or phone calls, denied books and clothes, and being switched from cell to cell.

His relatives revealed that he had sustained injuries during harsh interrogations requiring his head to be bandaged. Goudarzi told relatives that he was under immense pressure to accept false accusations made by intelligence personnel demanding that he "confess" to alliances with banned organizations.

In August 2010, Goudarzi joined Majid Tavakoli and other imprisoned activists in a hunger strike to protest conditions in Evin prison, where they were detained. In retaliation Goudarzi, Tavakoli and other journalists who had launched a hunger strike were transferred to solitary confinement. Goudarzi and Tavakoli were among 17 political prisoners who went on hunger strike. After his transfer to solitary confinement in May 2010, Goudarzi's mother said that she was no longer allowed to see him.

US Secretary of State Hillary Clinton in a statement on June 12, 2010 demanded the release of Goudarzi and other incarcerated activists in Iran stating, “The Iranian authorities responded to their citizens’ call for accountability and transparency with violence, arbitrary detentions, dubious trials, and intimidation.” She called for "the immediate release of all imprisoned human rights defenders," naming Goudarzi and six other jailed activists.

Initially charged with the capital crime of moharebeh (waging war against God), Goudarzi was later charged instead with "spreading propaganda against the regime" and was handed a one-year prison sentence. He was released in December of the same year after serving his sentence.

Joe Stork, deputy Middle East director at Human Rights Watch said about the charges against Goudarzi, “The authorities should be working to ensure the rights and safety of citizens exercising their rights to gather peacefully. Instead, they are preparing the groundwork to impose the harshest of punishments.”

Goudarzi spent 10 months in Tehran's Evin Prison with periods in solitary confinement, and was transferred to Rajai Shahr Prison in Karaj, where he served the remainder of his prison term before being released upon serving his one-year sentence on December 14, 2010.

During his prison term, Goudarzi was awarded the John Aubuchon Freedom of the Press Award from the US-based National Press Club.

== 2011 arrest ==
On July 31, 2011 Goudarzi was violently arrested without warning by plainclothes officials. His flatmate and fellow blogger Behnam Ganji Khaibari was arrested as well.

Goudarzi's mother Parvin Mokhtareh was arbitrarily detained as well the following day in the city of Kerman, for reasons said to stem from her advocacy on her son's behalf.

Ganji was released a few weeks after the initial arrests. Friends described him as a "broken man" and stated that he and Goudarzi had been severely tortured. Following their release, Ganji and another friend of Goudarzi, Nahal Sahabi committed suicide on September 1, 2011 and September 28, 2011 respectively. The UK newspaper The Guardian reported following the suicides that "speculation is rife that the pair had been pressured while in jail to testify against Goudarzi". Amnesty International also reported that Ganji had been pressured to make a confession incriminating Goudarzi. It was reported that in the days following his detainment, a number of Kouhyar Goudarzi's friends and colleagues were summoned to present themselves at the offices of the Ministry of Intelligence for interrogation.

For months, Iranian officials refused to acknowledge Goudarzi's arrest, and his whereabouts remained unknown. Authorities were reported to be attempting to fabricate evidence linking Goudarzi to the militant Islamic group People's Mujahedin of Iran. When they finally acknowledged his arrest, authorities denied Goudarzi's lawyer's requests to meet with him. They provided no information as to why he was arrested while deprived of his basic rights or why his mother was simultaneously detained in Kerman.

Goudarzi's mother was said to be used as an example to the family members of other incarcerated activists. She had been very active in discussing the plight of her son during his previous incarceration. Goudarzi later said in an interview that his mother had "in a way become a model for the families of other political prisoners on how to inform others about their [loved ones] and not allow their rights to be violated." In December 2011, after being held in the Kerman detention center of the Information Ministry and spending 8 months behind bars in Kerman prison, Goudarzi's mother Parvin Mokhtare was handed a 23-month prison sentence by the Kerman Revolutionary Court on the charges of “acting against national security” and “interviewing with foreign media.” On March 18, 2012, she was released from Kerman Prison, in the south- eastern province of Kerman after the Court of Appeals suspended her 23-month prison sentence. She also paid a fine for the charge of "insulting the martyrs" before being released on bail.

There was speculation that Goudarzi's arrest stemmed from an interview he conducted with Spiegel International. Goudarzi had launched a hunger strike in solidarity with his friends in prison. In the interview Goudarzi said, “I've been out for the last seven months, but you always have one foot in prison if you campaign for human rights and are politically involved.”

Following Goudarzi's arrest ensued an international outcry from various individuals, states, and human rights organizations demanding his immediate release.

Amnesty International expressed fears for his safety, named Goudarzi and his mother prisoners of conscience, and called for their immediate and unconditional release. The National Press Club expressed "outrage" over his detention, the Committee to Protect Journalists issued a statement on his behalf, and Reporters Without Borders condemned the arrest.

Reporters Without Borders said that “arbitrarily arresting and holding a political prisoner incommunicado is regarded as enforced disappearance by the International Convention for the Protection of All Persons from Enforced Disappearance. Article 2 of this convention bans “the arrest, detention, abduction or any other form of deprivation of liberty by agents of the state or by persons or groups of persons acting with the authorization, support or acquiescence of the state, followed by a refusal to acknowledge the deprivation of liberty or by concealment of the fate or whereabouts of the disappeared person, which place such a person outside the protection of the law.

The National Press Club called on Iran's government to set free the jailed Kouhyar Goudarzi his mother and all journalists and other citizens who have suffered retaliation merely for exercising the basic human right of self-expression.

Front Line Defenders said it “believes that Kouhyar Goudarzi arrest and incommunicado detention, as well as the arrest and detention of his mother Parvin Mokhtareh, is directly linked to Kouhyar Goudarzi's work as a human rights defender, in particular his work with CHRR.”

Human Rights Watch said “Disappearing an Iranian citizen for more than six weeks without any semblance of legal process violates both Iranian and international laws which Iran's government pretends to respect.”

Lawyers’ Rights Watch of Canada (LRWC) demanded, “The Iranian government immediately cease the continued and unlawful harassment of Kouhyar Goudarzi,” and said “Harassment of Kouhyar Goudarzi is an attempt to silence his legitimate human rights activities and that his sentence of “imprisonment in internal exile” is not provided for in Iranian legislation.”

The Observatory for the Protection of Human Rights Defenders said it, "denounces this new arbitrary verdict against Mr. Kouhyar Goudarzi since it seems to merely aim at sanctioning his legitimate human rights activities, amid the continuing repression of the Iranian civil society."

On April 12, 2012 after spending about 9 months behind bars, 3 months incommunicado with his whereabouts unknown, 2 months in solitary confinement under intense interrogations and torture, Goudarzi was released on bail pending his appeal.

== Prison sentence ==
On March 7, 2012 while in prison, the courts informed Goudarzi he had received a 5-year prison sentence in exile at the remote city of Zabol, handed down to him on charges of “spreading propaganda against the system” and “gathering and colluding against national security.”

With the insistence of the security apparatus, the sentence was upheld in September 2012 by Branch 54 of the Revolutionary Court.

== Awards ==
In 2010 Goudarzi was presented the John Aubuchon Freedom of the Press Award from the National Press Club while he was behind bars. Alan Bjerga, the president of the club said at the award ceremony, “This award is meant to honor those who have done their utmost to advance the cause of press freedom and open government.” He said Goudarzi reminded "us of the importance of working for a free press in the United States and abroad."

Kouhyar Goudarzi's mother Parvin Mokhtare, received the award on his behalf while he was still incarcerated.

During the award ceremony, National Press Club president Mark Hamick, a broadcast journalist with the Associated Press expressed his outrage. “The imprisonment of Kouhyar Goudarzi and his mother is a slap in the face to the world community." The National Press Club called upon Iran to free all incarcerated journalists and political prisoners.

In a letter to the National Press Club, Goudarzi's mother Parvin Mokhtare said in part, “On behalf of Kouhyar and myself I dedicate this award to the Green and great nation of Iran… Since my son remains in prison at this time I hope someday he will be able to receive his prize in person. With greetings to all free people of the world.”

== Exile ==
In March 2013, faced with a 5-year prison sentence in exile in the remote city of Zabol, constant pressures, harassment and threats from the authorities, Kouhyar Goudarzi fled Iran to ensure his safety. He continues his human rights work from outside the country.

Several news outlets associated with the Iranian government have since published critical and hostile reports about Goudarzi, asking that he be brought back to Iran and be punished. One outlet, Bultan News which serves as a regime mouthpiece, referred to journalist and human rights activist Kouhyar Goudarzi as a "fugitive criminal who has fled the country" and demanded that "responsible agencies make the necessary arrangements to catch this fugitive and bring him to his punishment."
