= Filep Karma =

West Papuan independence activist (1959–2022)

- Filep Karma wearing his East Timorese hat and West Papuan flag as his clothing pin.
- Born: Filep Jacob Semuel Karma; 14 August 1959; Jayapura, Dutch New Guinea
- Died: 1 November 2022 (aged 63); Jayapura, Papua, Indonesia
- Known for: 2004 arrest

Filep Jacob Semuel Karma (14 August 1959 – 1 November 2022) was a West Papua independence activist. On 1 December 2004, he helped raise the Morning Star flag at a ceremony in Jayapura, for which he was charged with treason and given a fifteen-year prison sentence. Amnesty International and Human Rights Watch protested on his behalf, the former designating him a prisoner of conscience. He was released on 19 November 2015.

== Background ==
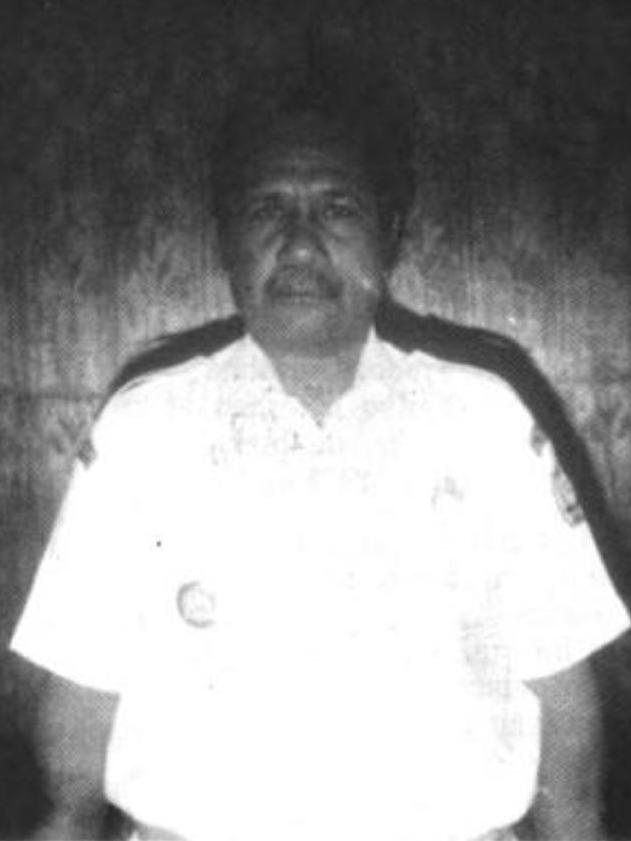
Andreas Karma

Born in 1959 in Jayapura, Dutch New Guinea, Karma was raised in an upper-class family active in local politics. His father, Andreas Karma, was a civil servant educated by the Dutch who had continued to work in the Indonesian government after independence, serving as a regent of Wamena and Serui, and Constant Karma, one of Filep Karma's cousins, served as deputy governor of Papua.

Filep Karma was influenced as a child by a midnight raid on his home by Indonesian soldiers who broke the family's furniture. The raid resulted from a false tipoff mistaking two visiting relatives from Biak for his uncles, Sam Karma and Jan Pieter Karma, colonels for the OPM. He suspected the informant was his relative, Fritz Karma, as he was member of the Polri and informant for the TNI, who visited in the afternoon before the raid.

He later studied at Sebelas Maret University for a time in Solo, Java for which he earned an undergraduate degree and became a civil servant like his father. In 1997, he traveled to Manila to study for a year at the Asian Institute of Management. He was unable to finish his studies.

Karma had two children from his Malay-Javanese wife, Ratu Karel Lina, named Audryne and Andrefina.

== Flag-raisings and prison terms ==
The Morning Star flag, used by supporters of Papuan independence

When Karma returned from Manila, he found Java engulfed in protests against President Suharto. He became involved in the movement and began advocating the secession of Papua from Indonesia.

On 2 July 1998, he led a ceremony to raise the West Papuan flag in Biak, following which activists clashed with police, resulting in injuries to a dozen officers. The Indonesian military occupied Biak Island four days later and fired on the activists; Karma alleged that more than 100 protesters were killed and buried on nearby islands, though a precise death toll is unknown. Human Rights Watch protested the Indonesian government's actions, noting that in the months that followed, the regime "continuously failed to carry out a serious investigation of these incidents, or hold accountable the perpetrators of abuses against the people in Biak".

Karma himself was wounded in both legs by rubber bullets. He was then arrested, tried, and sentenced to six-and-a-half years' imprisonment for treason; the sentence was overturned on appeal after Karma had been in prison for ten months.

On 1 December 2004, he participated in a second flag-raising ceremony, marking the anniversary of Papuan independence. Indonesian security forces were again alleged to have fired into the crowd, killing pro-independence activists, and Karma was again arrested on charges of treason against the Indonesian state, this time along with fellow activist Yusak Pakage.

At Karma's trial, Judge A. Lakoni Hernie said, "Don't bring your God's Name here (in this trial), He was already dead," and gave him triple the sentence that the prosecution had requested. Karma served this fifteen-year sentence in Abepura Prison in Jayapura. Pakage was imprisoned on a ten-year sentence, which he served until early release in 2010. After the trial, Karma's lawyers reportedly found a dog's severed head on their doorstep accompanied by a note reading "Kill Karma".

== Reports of abuse and international attention ==
In August 2008, 40 members of the U.S. Congress sent a letter to Indonesia calling for Pakage's and Karma's release, in response to which a 100-person rally protested in front of the U.S. Embassy in Jakarta.

In 2009, the Asian Human Rights Commission stated that guards had beaten Karma for returning late from a prison leave on 1 February, breaking his glasses and tearing one of his eyelids. In 2010, Karma was allowed to give an interview to a local radio station, in which he stated that he had been regularly abused by prison authorities: "I have been punched, kicked, pulled. But what hurts more is the mental torture we are subjected to." A spokesman for Indonesia's Foreign Ministry responded to the BBC News that "allegations of prisoner abuse were always investigated and dealt with properly."

In May 2010, prison officials denied the request of Karma's doctors to take him to Jakarta for proper medical treatment, and Amnesty International again issued an alert for his safety. In December 2010, Karma was transferred to a Jayapura police station following a riot at the prison, causing Human Rights Watch to reiterate its call for him and his fellow political prisoners to be freed, and to protest his lack of access to legal counsel. He was soon transferred back to Abepura Prison.

Amnesty International issued another alert on Karma's behalf in April 2012, when the organization alleged that prison officials were refusing to provide him medical treatment for a possible tumor. He received treatment in September of that year.

== Release and death ==
Karma was granted early release, after serving 11 years of his 15-year sentence, on 19 November 2015. This was as part of President Joko Widodo's policy of clemency toward Papuan political prisoners. Karma had been offered release earlier in 2015 but had refused to sign the pardon paperwork out of principle.

On 12 December 2021, Karma, who had a hobby of diving (molo), was declared missing after diving near Tirta Mandala Hotel, Dok V, Jayapura. He was found alive the next day, stranded on Skouw Yambe beach.

On 1 November 2022, Karma was found dead in a diving suit on the Base-G beach, Jayapura. According to Frits Ramandey of Komnas HAM Papua, there are no initial indications of foul play and that he likely drowned while diving. According to Andrefina Karma who took part in the examination, her father drowned because of strong waves. On 30 October, he was seen swimming with family members, but decided to not go home with them as he wanted to dive that morning but because of high tides decided to wait it out and visited other relatives living in Deplat, Jayapura in the afternoon. She was later informed on the morning of 1 November that her father was found dead on the Base G beach. She wished for the best for her father and hoped there would be no rumours or hoax as his death was purely an accident.
