= Atefeh Nabavi =

Iranian student activist

Atefeh Nabavi is an Iranian student activist. In November 2009, she was imprisoned for four years for participating in post-election protests. She is the first woman to be sentenced for participating in protests in the aftermath of the disputed Iranian election.

She was freed in May 2012, after nearly three full years in prison.
