= Miss Indonesia 2025 =

- Date: 9 July 2025
- Presenters: Amanda Zevannya; Robby Purba; Audrey Vanessa; Priyanka Putri
- Entertainment: Lyodra Ginting; Eka Gustiwana; Shabrina Leonita; Mawar Eva de Jongh; Piche Kota
- Venue: RCTI+ Studio, Jakarta, Indonesia
- Broadcaster: RCTI
- Entrants: 38
- Placements: 15
- Winner: Audrey Bianca; Jakarta SCR

Miss Indonesia 2025 was the 19th edition of the Miss Indonesia pageant, held at the RCTI+ Studio in Jakarta, Indonesia on 29 May 2024. Miss World 2025 Suchata Chuangsri invited as special guest. Monica Kezia Sembiring of North Sumatra crowned Audrey Bianca Callista of North Sumatra as her successor at the end of the event. She represented Indonesia at Miss World 2025 and placed in the top forty.

== Results ==
=== Placements ===
| Placement | Contestant |
|---|---|
| Miss Indonesia 2025 | Jakarta — Audrey Bianca CallistaΔ |
| 1st Runner-up | East Java — Zefanya Sharon Iswanto |
| 2nd Runner-up | North Sumatra — Cyndi Patricia Figo Δ |
| 3rd Runner-up | Bengkulu — Anggia Rosvina Putri |
| 4th Runner-up | Bali — Nyoman Putri Vidya Paramanda Δ |
| 5th Runner-up | West Papua — Maria Ariska Happy Suntadi |
| Top 15 | Aceh — Rani Salsabila EfendiΔ; Central Kalimantan — Verenne Tanara; Highland Papua — Karmen Anastasya Sicilia Ayorbaba Δ; Lampung — Beatrix Teana Vanda Hapsari Δ; Riau Islands — Regina Marvella; West Java — Mutiara Fabiana Sutjipto; West Sulawesi — Charoline Prisilia Penna; West Sumatra — Adalika Baruna Putri Nur Δ; Yogyakarta — Gendis Hapsari Patricia Sihdinanti Δ |

Δ – Entered the Top 15 by winning fast track

=== Fast Track ===
| Category | Contestant | Ref. |
|---|---|---|
| Beauty with a Purpose | Aceh — Rani Salsabila Efendi | |
| Model | Jakarta — Audrey Bianca Callista | |
| Talent | North Sumatra — Cyndi Patricia Figo | |
| Sports | Highland Papua — Karmen Anastasya Sicilia Ayorbaba | |
| Multimedia | Lampung — Beatrix Teana Vanda Hapsari; West Sumatra — Adalika Baruna Putri Nur | |
| Head-to-head Challenge | Bali — Nyoman Putri Vidya Paramanda | |
| Art Photograph | Yogyakarta — Gendis Hapsari Patricia Sihdinanti | |

=== Special awards ===
| Award | Contestant |
|---|---|
| Miss Congeniality | Highland Papua — Karmen Anastasya Sicilia Ayorbaba |
| Miss Favorite | Highland Papua — Karmen Anastasya Sicilia Ayorbaba |
| Miss Best Skin | East Java — Zefanya Sharon Iswanto |
| Miss Royale | Jakarta — Audrey Bianca Callista |

== Contestant ==
38 contestants competed for the title. Each province had one representative.

| Province | Contestant^{[a]} | Age^{[b]} | Hometown |
|---|---|---|---|
| Aceh | Rani Salsabila Efendi | 24 | Aceh Besar |
| Bali | Nyoman Putri Vidya Paramanda | 23 | Buléléng |
| (Bangka Belitung Islands) Bangka Belitung | Dela Agustina | 22 | Belitung Timur |
| Banten | Devina Priyanka Tingkerbelle Samnani | 19 | Tangerang |
| Bengkulu | Anggia Rosvina Putri | 19 | Bengkulu Tengah |
| (Special Region of Yogyakarta) DI Yogyakarta | Gendis Hapsari Patricia Sihdinanti | 22 | Gunungkidul |
| DKI Jakarta | Audrey Bianca Callista | 22 | Kepulauan Seribu |
| Gorontalo | Sharon Evangeline Tentero | 20 | Bone Bolango |
| Jambi | Brigita Agustina Sinurat | 22 | Kota Jambi |
| West Java | Mutiara Fabiana Sutjipto | 22 | Garut |
| Central Java | Margareth Hardiyanti Sitepu | 19 | Demak |
| East Java | Zefanya Sharon Iswanto | 22 | Gresik |
| West Kalimantan | Nathania Ferris | 23 | Kayong Utara |
| South Kalimantan | Crystalin Kaylee Yurianto | 22 | Banjar |
| (Central Kalimantan) Kalimantan Tengah | Verenne Tanara | 24 | Murung Raya |
| East Kalimantan | Nydia Yuliana Lembong | 20 | Balikpapan |
| North Kalimantan | Ave Reiri Zefanya Situmorang | 18 | Malinau |
| (Riau Islands) Riau Island | Regina Marvella | 23 | Batam |
| Lampung | Beatrix Teana Vanda Hapsari | 22 | Mesuji |
| (Maluku (province)) Maluku | Angela Rosari Lowell Saputan | 20 | Ambon |
| North Maluku | Vanesa Nicole Rehuellah Oppier | 19 | Kepulauan Sula |
| (West Nusa Tenggara) Nusa Tenggara Barat | Okta Fitri Yanti Siahaan | 18 | Sumbawa Barat |
| East Nusa Tenggara | Gracia Beauty Ningrum Boling | 18 | Alor |
| (Papua (province)) Papua | Elfira Estevina Lenora Duwiri | 21 | Waropen |
| (West Papua (province)) West Papua | Maria Ariska Happy Suntadi | 24 | Teluk Bintuni |
| Southwest Papua | Ribka Juliana Angganeta Warfandu | 23 | Sorong Selatan |
| Highland Papua | Karmen Anastasya Sicilia Ayorbaba | 21 | Yahukimo |
| South Papua | Yuliana Efrencia Kaize | 23 | Merauke |
| Central Papua | Michelle Kumi Florida Wandosa | 18 | Mimika |
| Riau | Kezia Andeka | 24 | Indragiri Hulu |
| West Sulawesi | Charoline Prisilia Penna | 18 | Mamasa |
| South Sulawesi | Tiara Kurnia | 23 | Makassar |
| Central Sulawesi | Zellina Mangadang | 21 | Banggai Kepulauan |
| Southeast Sulawesi | Qubailla Nadhira Aida Safitri | 19 | Kendari |
| North Sulawesi | Kerenhapukh Piay Turangan | 22 | Manado |
| West Sumatra | Adalika Baruna Putri Nur | 22 | Pasaman |
| South Sumatra | Janet Adaeze Iyke | 22 | Palembang |
| North Sumatra | Cyndi Patricia Figo | 19 | Deli Serdang |

Catatan

- ^{a} Contestant name using their full name.
- ^{b} Ages at the time of the pageant.
