= Mek languages =

Trans–New Guinea language branch

Mek
- Goliath
- Geographic distribution: Yahukimo and Pegunungan Bintang, Highland Papua
- Ethnicity: Mek people and Yali people
- Linguistic classification: Trans–New Guinea: Central West New Guinea; Momuna–Mek; Mek

Language codes
- Glottolog: mekk1240
- Map: The Mek languages of New Guinea The Mek languages Other Trans–New Guinea languages Other Papuan languages Austronesian languages Uninhabited

The Mek languages are a well established family of Papuan languages spoken by the Mek people and Yali people. They form a branch of the Trans–New Guinea languages (TNG) in the classifications of Stephen Wurm (1975) and of Malcolm Ross (2005).

Mek, then called Goliath, was identified by M. Bromley in 1967. It was placed in TNG by Wurm (1975).

== Languages ==
The Mek languages form three dialect chains (Heeschen 1998):

- Eastern: Ketengban (including Okbap, Omban, Bime, Onya), Una (Goliath), Eipomek
- Northern: Kosarek Yale–Nipsan, Nalca
- Western: Korupun-Sela (including Dagi, Sisibna, Deibula)

== Proto-language ==
=== Phonemes ===
Usher (2020) reconstructs the consonant and vowel inventories as 'perhaps' as follows:

| *m | *n | | *ŋ | |
| *p | *t | | *k | *kʷ |
| *(m)b | *(n)d | | *(ŋ)g | *(ŋ)gʷ |
| | *s | | | |
| *w | *l | *j | | |

| i | | u |
| e | | o |
| ɛ | | ɔ |
| | a | ɒ |

| ei | ou |
| ɛi | ɔu |
| ai | au |
| aɛ | aɔ |

=== Pronouns ===
Pronouns are:

| | sg | pl |
|---|---|---|
| 1 | *na | *nu[n] |
| 2 | *kan | *kun (?) |
| 3 | *ɛl | *tun, *[t/s]ig |

The difference between the two 3pl forms is not known. 2pl and 3pl have parallels in Momuna /kun tun/.

=== Basic vocabulary ===
Some lexical reconstructions by Usher (2020) are:

| gloss | Proto-Mek | Proto-East Mek | Kimyal | Proto-Northwest Mek | Proto-Momuna-Mek | Momuna |
|---|---|---|---|---|---|---|
| hair/feather | *p[ɔ]t[ɔ]ŋ | *pɔtɔŋ | osoŋ | *hɔŋ | | |
| ear/twelve | *aᵓ | | ɔ | *aᵓ | | |
| eye | *atiŋ | *asiŋ | isiŋ | *haⁱŋ | *ɒtig | ɒtù |
| tooth/sharp | *jo̝ | | | | *jo̝ | jó |
| tongue | *se̝l[ija]mu | *[se̝]l[ija]mu | selamu | *se̝l[i]mu | | |
| foot/leg | *jan | *jan | jan | *jan | *j[a/ɒ]n | |
| blood | *e̝ne̝ŋ | *ɪnɪŋ | eneŋ | *e̝ne̝ŋ | *jo̝ne̝g | |
| bone | *jɔk | *jɔk | jw-aʔ | *jɔʔ[ɔ] | | |
| breast | *mɔᵘm | *mɔᵘm | moᵘm | *mɔᵘm | *mɔᵘm | mɒ̃ᵘ |
| louse | *ami | *ami | imi | *ami | *ami | ami |
| dog | *gam | *[k/g]am | gam | *gam | *gɒm | kɒ̀ |
| pig | *be̝sam | *bɪsam | | *bham | | wɒ́ |
| bird | *mak, *mag | *mak | -ma (?) | *-ma (?) | *mak | má |
| egg/fruit/seed | *do̝[k] | *dʊk | do | *do̝[k] | | dɒko ~ dɒku |
| tree/wood | *gal | | gal | *gal | *gɒl | kɒ̀ |
| woman/wife | *ge̝l | *[k/g]ɪl | gel | *ge̝l | | |
| sun | *k[ɛ]t[e̝]ŋ | *k[ɛ]t[ɪ]ŋ | isiŋ | *he̝ŋ | | |
| moon | *wal | *wal | wal | *wal | | |
| water/river | *m[ɛ/a]g | *mɛk | mag | *m[ɛ/a]g | | |
| fire | *o̝ᵘg | *ʊᵘk | ug | *[u]g | | |
| stone | *gɛⁱl; *gidig | *[k/g]ɛⁱl | girig | *gidig | | kè |
| path/way | *bi[t/s]ig | *bi[t/s]ik | bisig | *bhig | | |
| name | *si | *si | si | *si | *si | si |
| eat/drink | *de̝-(b) | *dɪ-(b) | de- | *de̝-(b) | | de- |
| one | *[na]tɔn | *tɔn | nason | *nhɔn | | |
| two/ring finger | *b[e̝/ɛ]te̝ne̝ | *b[ɪ/ɛ]tɪnɪ | besene | *bhe̝ne̝ | | |

== Modern reflexes ==
Mek reflexes of proto-Trans-New Guinea (pTNG) etyma are:

Eipo language:

- mun ‘belly’ < *mundun ‘internal organs’
- kuna ‘shadow’ < *k(a,o)nan
- saŋ ‘dancing song’ < *saŋ
- getane ‘sun’ < *kVtane

Bime language:

- mundo ‘belly’ < *mundun ‘internal organs’

Kosarek language:

- ami ‘louse’ < *niman
- si ‘tooth’ < *(s,t)i(s,t)i
- tomo < *k(i,u)tuma ‘night’

Yale language:

- de ‘to burn’ < *nj(a,e,i)
- mon ‘belly’ < *mundun ‘internal organs’
- xau ‘ashes’ < *kambu
