= Suntamon =

- Village
- Location in Papua and Indonesia Suntamon (Indonesia)
- Coordinates: 4°48′19.3608″S 140°10′16.7304″E
- Country: Indonesia
- Province: Highland Papua
- Regency: Yahukimo Regency
- District: Suntamon District
- Elevation: 9,236 ft (2,815 m)

Population (2010)
  - Total: 292
- Time zone: UTC+9 (Indonesia Eastern Standard Time)

Suntamon is a village in Suntamon district, Yahukimo Regency in Highland Papua province, Indonesia. Its population is 292.

== Climate ==
Suntamon has a cold subtropical highland climate (Cfb) with very heavy rainfall year-round.

Climate data for Suntamon
Month	Jan	Feb	Mar	Apr	May	Jun	Jul	Aug	Sep	Oct	Nov	Dec	Year
Mean daily maximum °C (°F)	19.6 (67.3)	19.5 (67.1)	19.1 (66.4)	18.9 (66.0)	18.4 (65.1)	17.6 (63.7)	17.0 (62.6)	16.9 (62.4)	17.9 (64.2)	19.2 (66.6)	19.6 (67.3)	19.6 (67.3)	18.6 (65.5)
Daily mean °C (°F)	13.9 (57.0)	13.9 (57.0)	13.9 (57.0)	13.7 (56.7)	13.5 (56.3)	12.8 (55.0)	12.5 (54.5)	12.3 (54.1)	12.6 (54.7)	13.4 (56.1)	13.5 (56.3)	13.9 (57.0)	13.3 (56.0)
Mean daily minimum °C (°F)	8.3 (46.9)	8.4 (47.1)	8.7 (47.7)	8.5 (47.3)	8.6 (47.5)	8.1 (46.6)	8.0 (46.4)	7.7 (45.9)	7.4 (45.3)	7.6 (45.7)	7.5 (45.5)	8.3 (46.9)	8.1 (46.6)
Average precipitation mm (inches)	367 (14.4)	353 (13.9)	382 (15.0)	342 (13.5)	339 (13.3)	342 (13.5)	346 (13.6)	321 (12.6)	303 (11.9)	352 (13.9)	309 (12.2)	353 (13.9)	4,109 (161.7)
Source: Climate-Data.org
