= Nalca language =

Language of Highland Papua, Indonesia

Nalca
- Mek Nalca, Hmanggona
- Native to: Highland Papua Indonesia
- Native speakers: 16,000 (2013)
- Language family: Trans–New Guinea: Mek; Northern; Nalca

Language codes
- ISO 639-3: nlc
- Glottolog: nalc1240

Nalca (Naltya, Naltje) is a Papuan language spoken in Yahukimo Regency, Highland Papua, Indonesia. Alternative names are Hmanggona, Hmonono, Kimnyal (Kimyal). The latter is most often used for Korupun-Sela. Indonesian Kemendikbud classified Nalca as Mek Nalca, while Kimyal is used for Korupun-Sela.

== History ==
The Nalca language was an unwritten language until missionaries from the USA entered the area in the early 1960s. A literacy program was developed, and many people in the Nalca language group learned to read. Roger Doriot from the USA learned the language and completed the translation of the New Testament of the Bible in 2000.

== Classification ==
Nalca belongs to the Western branch of the Mek languages, which is a family of closely related languages belonging to the larger grouping of Trans-New Guinea languages.

== Geographic distribution ==
The Nalca language is spoken by about 18,000 people in Yahukimo Regency, Highland Papua.

== Phonology ==
=== Consonants ===
Nalca has 15 phonemic consonants:

Consonant phonemes
	Bilabial		Alveolar		Palatal	Velar		Laryngeal
Plosive	pʰ	b	tʰ	d		kʰ	ɡ	ʔ
Fricative			s					h
Nasal		m		n			ŋ	
Tap or flap				ɾ				
Approximant		w			j			

- /tʰ/ only occurs in loanwords and names.

=== Vowels ===
Nalca has five phonemic vowels:

Monophthong phonemes
	Front	Central	Back
Close	i		u
Close-mid	e		o
Open-mid	ɛ		ɔ
Open		a	

== Grammar ==
=== Morphology ===
Nalca is a generally isolating language, but exhibits an elaborate system of agglutination in verb formation.

=== Syntax ===
The usual word order of Nalca is subject-object-verb (SOV).
