= Nipsan language =

Papuan language of Highland Papua

Nipsan
- Native to: Indonesia
- Native speakers: (2,500 cited 1993)
- Language family: Trans–New Guinea: Mek; Northern; Kosarek–Nipsan; Nipsan

Language codes
- ISO 639-3: nps
- Glottolog: nips1240

Nipsan (or Southern Yali/Yale, Mek Nipsan) is a Papuan language of Nipsan District, Yahukimo Regency, Highland Papua.
