= Sela, Indonesia =

Sela
- Village
- Location in Papua and Indonesia Sela (Indonesia)
- Coordinates: 4°33′8.1792″S 139°44′3.3432″E
- Country: Indonesia
- Province: Highland Papua
- Regency: Yahukimo Regency
- District: Sela District
- Elevation: 8,917 ft (2,718 m)

Population (2010)
  - Total: 619
- Time zone: UTC+9 (Indonesia Eastern Standard Time)

Sela is a village in Sela district, Yahukimo Regency in Highland Papua province, Indonesia. Its population is 619.

== Climate ==
Sela has a cool subtropical highland climate (Cfb) with heavy rainfall year-round.

Climate data for Sela
Month	Jan	Feb	Mar	Apr	May	Jun	Jul	Aug	Sep	Oct	Nov	Dec	Year
Mean daily maximum °C (°F)	20.1 (68.2)	20.1 (68.2)	19.6 (67.3)	19.5 (67.1)	19.0 (66.2)	18.3 (64.9)	17.7 (63.9)	17.6 (63.7)	18.5 (65.3)	19.8 (67.6)	20.1 (68.2)	20.1 (68.2)	19.2 (66.6)
Daily mean °C (°F)	14.4 (57.9)	14.5 (58.1)	14.4 (57.9)	14.2 (57.6)	14.0 (57.2)	13.5 (56.3)	13.1 (55.6)	12.9 (55.2)	13.2 (55.8)	14.0 (57.2)	14.0 (57.2)	14.4 (57.9)	13.9 (57.0)
Mean daily minimum °C (°F)	8.8 (47.8)	8.9 (48.0)	9.2 (48.6)	9.0 (48.2)	9.0 (48.2)	8.7 (47.7)	8.5 (47.3)	8.2 (46.8)	8.0 (46.4)	8.2 (46.8)	8.0 (46.4)	8.8 (47.8)	8.6 (47.5)
Average precipitation mm (inches)	337 (13.3)	330 (13.0)	350 (13.8)	316 (12.4)	304 (12.0)	300 (11.8)	305 (12.0)	288 (11.3)	275 (10.8)	315 (12.4)	277 (10.9)	322 (12.7)	3,719 (146.4)
Source: Climate-Data.org
