= Kosarek language =

Papuan language of Highland Papua

Kosarek
- Kosarek Yale, Mek Kosarek
- Native to: Indonesia
- Ethnicity: Yali people and Mek people
- Native speakers: (2,300 cited 1993)
- Language family: Trans–New Guinea: Mek; Northern; Kosarek–Nipsan; Kosarek
- Dialects: Gilika (Kilika)

Language codes
- ISO 639-3: kkl
- Glottolog: kosa1249

Kosarek (or Kosarek Yale, Mek Kosarek) is a Papuan language used in Kosarek District, Yahukimo Regency, Highland Papua.
