= Miss Indonesia 2024 =

- Date: 29 May 2024
- Presenters: Amanda Zevannya; Robby Purba; Harini Sondakh; Carla Yules
- Entertainment: Tiara Andini; Nabila Taqiyyah; Rony Parulian; Novia Bachmid; Mirabeth Sonia
- Venue: RCTI+ Studio, Jakarta, Indonesia
- Broadcaster: RCTI
- Entrants: 38
- Placements: 17
- Debuts: Southwest Papua
- Winner: Monica Kezia Sembiring; North Sumatra

Miss Indonesia 2024 was the 18th edition of the Miss Indonesia pageant, held at the RCTI+ Studio in Jakarta, Indonesia on 29 May 2024. Miss World 2023 Krystyna Pyszkova invited as special guest. Audrey Vanessa Susilo of North Sulawesi crowned Monica Kezia Sembiring of North Sumatra as her successor at the end of the event. She represented Indonesia at Miss World 2025 and placed in the top forty.

== Results ==
=== Placements ===
Placement	Contestant
Miss Indonesia 2024	North Sumatra — Monica Kezia Sembiring §
1st Runner-up	Yogyakarta – Clarita Cahya Adity §
2nd Runner-up	Bali – Anna Sakurai Dananjaya §
3rd Runner-up	Jakarta – Priyanka Puteri Ariffia §
4th Runner-up	Aceh – Arindina Aulia Taim
Top 17	Bangka Belitung – Imelda Laurentsia; Banten – Monica Florence §; Bengkulu – Gratia Ariny Togatorop; Central Sulawesi – Livia Monika §; East Java – Catarina Putri Amelia; Maluku – Tanaya Prameswari Wijaya §; North Sulawesi – Pingkan Engelina Putri Mirah; Riau – Martha Lena Lumban Gaol; Riau Islands – Christabella Khosasih; Southeast Sulawesi – Dagna Cantik Azzahra Irianto; West Papua – Annisa Luthfiyah Rachma §; West Sumatra – Ghassani Valerie Salsabila

§ – Entered the Top 17 by winning fast track

=== Fast track events ===
The winner of the fast track events automatically entered the Top 17 on the final night.

Category	Contestant
Beauty with a Purpose	Yogyakarta – Clarita Cahya Adity
Model	Banten – Monica Florence
Talent	Jakarta – Priyanka Puteri Ariffia
Sports	Bali – Anna Sakurai Dananjaya
Multimedia	North Sumatra – Monica Kezia Sembiring; Maluku – Tanaya Prameswari Wijaya
Head-to-head Challenge	Central Sulawesi – Livia Monika
Art Photography	West Papua – Annisa Luthfiyah Rachma

=== Special awards ===
Award	Contestant
Miss Congeniality	Highland Papua – Virjinia Martina Angela Sareng
Miss Favorite	Riau – Martha Lena Lumban Gaol
Miss Best Skin	East Kalimantan – Jessica Jennie Laurianto

== Contestants ==
38 contestants competed for the title. Each province had one representative.

Province	Delegate	Age^{[a]}	Hometown
Aceh	Arindina Aulia Taim	22	Takèngön
North Sumatra	Monica Kezia Sembiring	22	Langkat
West Sumatra	Ghassani Valerie Salsabila	23	Padangpiaman
Riau	Martha Lena Lumban Gaol	23	Pelalawan
Riau Islands	Christabella Khosasih	23	Kepulauan Anambas
Jambi	Jennifer Evelyn Samosir	22	Tanjungjabung Barat
South Sumatra	Mareta Aulia	22	Ogan Ilir
(Bangka Belitung Islands) Bangka Belitung	Imelda Laurentsia	23	Belitung Regency
Bengkulu	Gratia Ariny Togatorop	20	Bengkulu
Lampung	Syahirah Alika Violeta	21	Bandar Lampung
Jakarta	Priyanka Puteri Ariffia	23	East Jakarta
Banten	Monica Florence	23	Pandeglang
West Java	Niki Anartia	21	Bandung
Central Java	Izabella Nathalie Jendrianto	22	Purworejo
(Special Region of Yogyakarta) DI Yogyakarta	Clarita Cahya Adity	23	Yogyakarta City
East Java	Catarina Putri Amelia	21	Sidoarjo
Bali	Anna Sakurai Dananjaya	23	Mangupura
West Nusa Tenggara	Khorrunnissa Fuji Hasna Nadilla	22	Sumbawa
East Nusa Tenggara	Maria Ermelinda Wawo	23	Ngada
West Kalimantan	Tabita Debora Christina Tambunan	24	Sambas
South Kalimantan	Sherly Angelina Lumajang	23	Tabalong
Central Kalimantan	Claudia Florenza Lola Ananta	19	Kotawaringin Barat
East Kalimantan	Jessica Jennie Laurianto	23	Balikpapan
North Kalimantan	Kaetlyn William	22	Nunukan
South Sulawesi	Elizabeth Putri Sri Cahyani Massora	20	Tana Toraja
West Sulawesi	Swara Adzani	22	Mamuju Tengah
Southeast Sulawesi	Dagna Cantik Azzahra Irianto	22	Konawe Utara
Central Sulawesi	Livia Monika	21	Banggai Laut
Gorontalo	Angeline Sofia Natasha	21	Pohuwato
North Sulawesi	Pingkan Engelina Putri Mirah	24	Manado
(Maluku (province)) Maluku	Tanaya Prameswari Wijaya	22	Seram Bagian Timur
North Maluku	Christivania Ferini Dodolang	24	Halmahera Selatan
(West Papua (province)) West Papua	Annisa Luthfiyah Rachma	21	Pegunungan Arfak
Southwest Papua	Ayu Veronika Yen Lis Worait	22	Maybrat
(Papua (province)) Papua	Luciana Yustina Ambu Wangga	18	Kepulauan Yapen
Central Papua	Aurelia Jillian Eddy	19	Nabire
Highland Papua	Virjinia Martina Angela Sareng	19	Mamberamo Tengah
South Papua	Hendrina Yosephina Gebze	20	Merauke

Notes

^{a} Ages at the time of the pageant.
