= Nop Goliat Dekai Airport =

Nop Goliat Dekai Airport Bandar Udara Nop Goliat Dekai
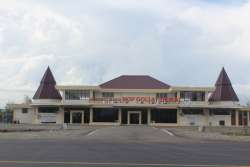
- IATA: DEX; ICAO: WAVD

Summary
- Airport type: Public
- Owner: Government of Indonesia
- Operator: Ministry of Transportation
- Serves: Dekai
- Location: Yahukimo Regency, Highland Papua, Indonesia
- Time zone: WITA (UTC+09:00)
- Elevation AMSL: 100 m (330 ft)
- Coordinates: 4.853996°S 139.485673°E

Map
- Location in Highland Papua Location in Indonesia

Runways
Direction	Length		Surface
Direction	m	ft	Surface
07/25	2,600	8,530	Asphalt
- Sources: DGCA

Nop Goliat Dekai Airport (IATA: DEX, ICAO: WAVD) is an airport serving the town of Dekai, the capital of Yahukimo Regency, Highland Papua, Indonesia. Nop Goliat Airport is one of the seven pioneer airports that connects 517 villages in Yahukimo. The airport was built on an area of 230 hectares between 2004–2010 by using a budget of Rp321 billion. The airport was built to be a logistics distribution center in the highland region of Papua, as well as supporting the mobility of people and goods. Construction of airports is intended as a logistics distribution center for central highland region of Papua Province, which previously concentrated through Wamena Airport.

After extensive delays, the airport was finally inaugurated by President Joko Widodo (Jokowi) on 18 October 2016. Jokowi personally wanted this airport to be developed and requested Minister of Transportation Budi Karya Sumadi to extend the runway from 1,950 m to 2,500 metres over the next 2 years. The Ministry of Transportation has allocated Rp350 billion ($26.8 million) for the expansion, so the expansion runway can serve Boeing 737-200 and Boeing 737-300. It was predicted that the expansion would be finished in 2017.

Currently, Nop Goliat airport's runway is 1,950 m × 30 m, with two exit taxiways measuring 75 m × 23 m each, an apron measuring 320 m × 60 m as well as other supporting facilities. The airport terminal building itself has an area of 1,900 m² and can accommodate 300 passengers at peak hours.

== Facilities ==
The airport resides at an elevation of 55 metres (180 ft) above mean sea level. It has one runway designated 07/25 with an asphalt surface measuring 1,950 m × 30 m (6,398 ft × 98 ft).

== Airlines and destinations ==
The following destinations are served from Nop Goliat Dekai Airport:

Airlines	Destinations
Susi Air	Jayapura, Wamena
Trigana Air	Jayapura

== Incidents and Accidents ==
On March 11, 2023, a Trigana Air Boeing 737-500 (PK-YSC) operating IL-221 from Jayapura to Yahukimo was shot at on approach. The aircraft landed safely. The aircraft turned around and was shot at on departure as well when it flew the return flight to Jayapura, IL-222. A bullet penetrated the aircraft's fuselage and went into seat 7A. A passenger was injured by the shrapnel. The aircraft landed in Jayapura. The Yahukimo police arrested seven people.

On February 17, 2024, a Wings Air ATR 72-600 (PK-WGT) operating IW 1646 from Timika to Yahukimo was shot at on approach, injuring one passenger. A bullet penetrated the aircraft's fuselage and went above seat 19A. Police blamed the attack on an "armed criminal group".
