= Eipo language =

Mek language spoken in Indonesia

Eipo
- Lik
- Native to: Indonesia
- Region: Eipo River area in Eipumek District, Pegunungan Bintang Regency, Highland Papua
- Ethnicity: Eipo people
- Native speakers: (3,000 cited 1987)
- Language family: Trans–New Guinea: Mek; Eastern; Eipo
- Writing system: Latin

Language codes
- ISO 639-3: eip
- Glottolog: eipo1242

Eipo (Eipomek), or Lik, is a Mek language of the eastern highlands of Eipumek District, Pegunungan Bintang Regency, Highland Papua. It spoken by the Eipo people who live along the Eipo River. A large percentage of its vocabulary is shared with Una and Tanime, and they form one dialect area.

== Classification ==
Eipo belongs to the Eastern branch of Mek languages, which is a family of closely related languages belonging to the larger grouping of Trans-New Guinea languages.

== Geographic distribution ==
The Eipo language is spoken by about 3,000 people along the Eipo River in the valley of Eipomek, which is situated in the eastern highlands of Highland Papua.

== Phonology ==
=== Consonants ===
Eipo exhibits the following 16 phonemic consonants:

Consonant phonemes
	Bilabial		Labio- dental	Alveolar		Palatal		Velar	
Plosive	p	b		t	d	c		k	ɡ
Fricative		β	f	s					
Nasal		m			n				ŋ
Tap or flap					ɾ				
Approximant							j		

- /p/ indicates a labialized [pʷɵ].
- /c/ indicates a palatalized [tʲ].

=== Vowels ===
Eipo has five phonemic vowels:

Monophthong phonemes
	Front	Central	Back
Close	i		u
Open-mid	e		o
Open		a	

Diphthongs are not regarded as separate phonemes.

== Grammar ==
=== Morphology ===
Eipo is generally isolating language, but exhibits an elaborate system of agglutination in verb formation.

=== Syntax ===
The usual word order of Eipo is subject-object-verb (SOV).

== Deictics ==
Eipo has only four basic spatial deictics, which are usually accompanied by pointing gestures, since the deictics are used during face-to-face communication to refer to positions relative to the person.

- a- ‘here’
- ei- ‘up there’
- ou-, u- ‘down there’
- or-, er- ‘across there’ (‘across-valley’)

== Interrogatives ==
Eipo has many compound interrogatives:

- yate ‘what?, which?, what kind of?’
  - yate anye ‘who?’
  - yate ate ‘why? (what for)’
  - yate arye ‘why? (what reason)’
  - yate-barye ‘why?’
  - yate-sum ‘when? (what day/time)’
- dan- ‘where?, where to, whence’
  - dan-segum ‘whereabouts? (approximate location)’
  - dan-tam ("where side") ‘where, whence, whereto’
  - dan-ak ("where at") ‘where, whence, whereto’

== Writing system ==
Eipo is not historically a written language, but in recent decades a Latin alphabet has been devised for it. The letter values are mostly those of the IPA letters given above, with the exceptions of /β/ ⟨w⟩, /ŋ/ ⟨ng⟩, /ɾ/ ⟨r⟩, and /j/ ⟨y⟩.
