= Goliath language =

Language of Highland Papua, Indonesia

Una
- Goliath
- Region: Highland Papua
- Native speakers: 5,600 (2006)
- Language family: Trans–New Guinea: Mek; Eastern; Una

Language codes
- ISO 639-3: mtg
- Glottolog: unaa1239

Una, better known as Goliath, is a Papuan language spoken in Yahukimo Regency, Highland Papua.

Dialects are (Western) Una, Bomela, Tanime, Eastern Sela, Kinome. Eastern Una is closer to Ketengban (and often considered a dialect of).

== Phonology ==
The following data is sourced from Louwerse (1988).

=== Vowels ===
Una has 7 monophthong phonemes:

	Front	Central	Back
Close	i ⟨iy⟩		u ⟨uw⟩
Near-close	ɪ ⟨i⟩		ʊ ⟨u⟩
Open-mid	ɛ ⟨e⟩		ɔ ⟨o⟩
Open		a ⟨a⟩	

=== Consonants ===
Una has 19 consonant phonemes:

		Bilabial			Alveolar		Palatal	Velar	
		plain	labial	palatal	plain	palatal	Palatal	plain	labial
Nasal		m ⟨m⟩	mʷ ⟨mw⟩		n ⟨n⟩	nʲ ⟨ny⟩		ŋ ⟨ng⟩	
Plosive	voiceless				t ⟨t⟩	tʲ ⟨c⟩		k ⟨k⟩	kʷ ⟨kw⟩
Plosive	voiced	b ⟨b⟩	bʷ ⟨bw⟩	bʲ ⟨by⟩	d ⟨d⟩	dʲ ⟨j⟩			
Fricative					s ⟨s⟩				
Approximant					l ⟨l⟩	lʲ ⟨ly⟩	j ⟨y⟩		w ⟨w⟩

== Bibliography ==
- Louwerse, John (1988). The Morphosyntax of Una in Relation to Discourse Structure: A Descriptive Analysis (PDF). Pacific Linguistics, Series B. Vol. 100. Canberra: Pacific Linguistics, Research School of Pacific Studies, Australian National University.
