= Korupun language =

Mek language spoken in Highland Papua, Indonesia

Korupun-Sela Kimyal
- Region: Indonesia
- Ethnicity: Kimyal (Yelenang)
- Native speakers: (8,000 cited 1996)
- Language family: Trans–New Guinea: Mek; Korupun-Sela Kimyal
- Dialects: Korupun (Duram); Dagi; Sisibna (Gobugdua); Deibula; Sela

Language codes
- ISO 639-3: kpq
- Glottolog: koru1245 Korupun-Sela kora1298 Korapun-Bromley

Korupun (Korapun) is a Papuan language spoken in Yahukimo Regency, Highland Papua. Dialects are Korupun (Duram), Dagi, Sisibna (Gobugdua), Deibula, (Western) Sela. It is also known as Kimyal of Korupun; Kimyal is another name for Nalca. Indonesian Kemendikbud classified the former as Mek Nalca, while Korupun-Sela is classified as Kimyal.

According to Timothy Usher, the "Korupun" described by Bromley is a separate, though closely related, language.
