= Miss Indonesia 2022 =

17th Miss Indonesia competition

- Date: 15 September 2022
- Presenters: Amanda Zefannya; Daniel Mananta; Harini Sondakh; Robby Purba
- Entertainment: Andmesh Kamaleng; Judika; Lyodra Ginting
- Venue: RCTI+ Studio, Jakarta, Indonesia
- Broadcaster: RCTI
- Entrants: 37
- Placements: 15
- Debuts: Central Papua; Highland Papua; South Papua
- Winner: Audrey Vanessa Susilo; North Sulawesi

Miss Indonesia 2022 was the 17th edition of the Miss Indonesia pageant, held at the RCTI+ Studio in Jakarta, Indonesia on 15 September 2022.

Pricilia Carla Yules of South Sulawesi crowned Audrey Vanessa Susilo of North Sulawesi as her successor at the end of the event. She represented Indonesia at Miss World 2023 and placed in the top forty.

== Background ==
=== Location and date ===
Miss Indonesia 2022 was held at RCTI+ Studio in Jakarta on 15 September 2022 after cancelling the 2021 edition due to the COVID-19 pandemic. It was the first edition of the pageant to be held in the second half of a year.

=== Selection of participants ===
All contestants were chosen through an online audition that was held for five months starting from January to June 2022. Instead of the usual 34, there were 37 contestants competing for the title. Three new provinces of Indonesia made their debuts at the pageant this year. They were Central Papua, Highland Papua, and South Papua. As a result, this is the biggest turnout for Miss Indonesia to date.

== Results ==
=== Placements ===
Placement	Contestant
Miss Indonesia 2022	North Sulawesi – Audrey Vanessa Susilo §
1st Runner-Up	Bali – Ida Ayu Laksmi Anjali §
2nd Runner-Up	East Java – Alyssandra Yemima Gabe Winyoto
3rd Runner-Up	West Kalimantan – Angelina Aqila Suryadi
4th Runner-Up	Riau – Naomy Angelica Sembiring
Top 15	Central Java – Angelique Tiara; Central Sulawesi – Jessica Jivilia Mariana Pangemanan; Highland Papua – Manasena Susana Gibannebit Giban §; Jakarta SCR – Jofinka Putri Bandini; Lampung – Shaqilla Vianta Azzana §; Maluku – Velda Devona Aipassa; North Sumatra – Megan Lisandra Elmira Kilsch §; West Java – Gina Maheswari Syailendra §; West Nusa Tenggara – Alila Asher Pranita; West Sumatra – Julia Yasmin

§ Entered the Top 15 by winning fast track

=== Fast track events ===
The winner of the fast track events automatically entered the Top 15 on the final night.

Category	Contestant
Beauty with a Purpose	Lampung – Shaqilla Vianta Azzana
Model	North Sumatra – Megan Lisandra Elmira Kilsch
Talent	North Sulawesi – Audrey Vanessa Susilo
Social Media (Multimedia)	North Sulawesi – Audrey Vanessa Susilo
Sports	West Java – Gina Maheswari Syailendra
Head-to-head Challenge	Highland Papua – Manasena Susana Gibannebit Giban
Art Photography	Bali – Ida Ayu Laksmi Anjali

=== Special awards ===
Award	Contestant
Miss Congeniality	West Sulawesi – Theysa Nohany Siku
Miss Favorite (Miss App&Text Vote)	Aceh – Edlina Hurin Urba Karina

== Contestants ==
37 contestants competed for the title. Each province had one representative.

Province	Delegate	Age (Note: Ages at the time of the pageant.)	Height	Hometown
Aceh	Edlina Hurin Urba Karina	21	1.67 m (5 ft 5 1/2 in)	Gayo Lues
North Sumatra	Megan Lisandra Elmira Kilsch	22	1.74 m (5 ft 8 1/2 in)	Medan
West Sumatra	Julia Yasmin	21	1.72 m (5 ft 7 1/2 in)	Tanah Datar
Riau	Naomy Angelica	20	1.68 m (5 ft 6 in)	Indragiri Hulu
Riau Islands	Jessie Joy Kartini	19	1.67 m (5 ft 5 1/2 in)	Batam
Jambi	Michelle Huang	22	1.68 m (5 ft 6 in)	South Jambi
South Sumatra	Audra Nabila Kasanopha	21	1.69 m (5 ft 6 1/2 in)	Musi Banyuasin
(Bangka Belitung Islands) Bangka Belitung	Maharani Devi Adzani	23	1.67 m (5 ft 5 1/2 in)	West Bangka
Bengkulu	Nova Liana	21	1.75 m (5 ft 9 in)	Kepahiang
Lampung	Shaqilla Vianta Azzana	22	1.70 m (5 ft 7 in)	Bandar Lampung
Special Capital Region of Jakarta	Jofinka Putri Bandini	22	1.70 m (5 ft 7 in)	Southern Jakarta
Banten	Diva Andzani	21	1.73 m (5 ft 8 in)	Serang
West Java	Gina Maheswari Syailendra	21	1.67 m (5 ft 5 1/2 in)	Bandung
Central Java	Angelique Tiara	23	1.72 m (5 ft 7 1/2 in)	Ungaran
Special Region of Yogyakarta	Regita Fauziyyah Luxcyanti	22	1.70 m (5 ft 7 in)	Sleman
East Java	Alyssandra Yemima Gabe Winyoto	22	1.73 m (5 ft 8 in)	Malang
Bali	Ida Ayu Laksmi Anjali	22	1.71 m (5 ft 7 1/2 in)	Jembrana
West Nusa Tenggara	Alila Asher Pranita	23	1.70 m (5 ft 7 in)	Bima
East Nusa Tenggara	Maria Magdalena Yolanda Mau	20	1.67 m (5 ft 5 1/2 in)	Belu
West Kalimantan	Angelina Aqila Suryadi	20	1.70 m (5 ft 7 in)	Singkawang
South Kalimantan	Mercien Grace Gui	24	1.68 m (5 ft 6 in)	Southern Upriver
Central Kalimantan	Dara Natania Han	21	1.68 m (5 ft 6 in)	Palangkaraya
East Kalimantan	Tabitha Vivi Wijayanti	19	1.68 m (5 ft 6 in)	West Kutai
North Kalimantan	Cellica Tcah	23	1.68 m (5 ft 6 in)	Tana Tidung
South Sulawesi	Nanda Aprianti Arief	20	1.68 m (5 ft 6 in)	Makassar
West Sulawesi	Theysa Nohany Siku	21	1.65 m (5 ft 5 in)	Mamasa
Southeast Sulawesi	Kenisa Chelsi Darmawan	21	1.72 m (5 ft 7 1/2 in)	Kolaka
Central Sulawesi	Jessica Jivilia Mariana	23	1.70 m (5 ft 7 in)	Tolitoli
Gorontalo	Yashafa Rachel Azzahra	22	1.73 m (5 ft 8 in)	Gorontalo
North Sulawesi	Audrey Vanessa Susilo	22	1.68 m (5 ft 6 in)	Manado
(Maluku (province)) Maluku	Velda Devona Aipassa	22	1.67 m (5 ft 5 1/2 in)	Tual
North Maluku	Aurelia Vanessa	22	1.67 m (5 ft 5 1/2 in)	Ternate
(West Papua (province)) West Papua	Vezhia Juliet Eddy	21	1.73 m (5 ft 8 in)	Fakfak
(Papua (province)) Papua	Christina Agnes Jaflean	21	1.72 m (5 ft 7 1/2 in)	Jayapura
Central Papua	Chatharine Aprilia Rahaded	22	1.73 m (5 ft 8 in)	Mimika
Highland Papua	Manasena Susana Gibannebit Giban	22	1.71 m (5 ft 7 1/2 in)	Jayawijaya
South Papua	Elisabeth Valentine Jose Emilia Gebse	18	1.68 m (5 ft 6 in)	Merauke
