= Wanam =

Wanam may refer to:

- Wanám people, a historic ethnic group of Brazil
- Wañam language, an extinct language of Brazil
- village dialects of several unrelated languages of New Guinea:
  - Kosarek language, of Yahukimo Regency, Papua, Indonesia
  - Tami language, of Morobe Province, Papua New Guinea
- Wanam, a village in Merauke Regency, Papua, Indonesia, where the Yelmek language is spoken
