= Audrey Bianca =

Indonesian model and beauty pageant titleholder

- Born: February 28, 2003 (age 23); Jakarta, Indonesia
- Education: Leiden University
- Occupations: Model; marketing specialist; content creator
- Height: 1.75 m (5 ft 9 in)
- Beauty pageant titleholder
- Title: Miss Indonesia DKI Jakarta 2025; Miss Indonesia 2025
- Major competitions: Indonesia's Next Top Model (cycle 1); (9th place); Miss Indonesia 2025; (Winner); Miss World 2026; (Top 40)

Audrey Bianca Callista (born 28 February 2003) is an Indonesian model, marketing specialist, and beauty pageant titleholder who was crowned Miss Indonesia 2025. She represented DKI Jakarta at the contest and later represented Indonesia at the Miss World 2026 competition in Vietnam.

== Early life and education ==
Callista was born on 28 February 2003 in Jakarta, Indonesia. She completed her secondary education at St. John's Catholic School in Jakarta. She later pursued higher education in the Netherlands, graduating with a bachelor's degree in Political Science (focusing on International Relations and Organizations) from Leiden University in 2024. During her university studies, she also completed a minor in Companies and Value Sensitive Innovations at Delft University of Technology (TU Delft) between 2023 and 2024.

In November 2023, Callista attended the 43rd Plenary Assembly of the World Federation of United Nations Associations (WFUNA) in Tbilisi, Georgia, representing the United Nations Association Indonesia. She is a polyglot who speaks Indonesian, English, Dutch, German, Mandarin, and French. Professional-wise, she has worked as a marketing specialist for a digital skincare brand.

== Career ==
=== Modeling and television ===
Callista began modeling in 2018 under JIM Models before joining Kick Management in 2020. She gained national public recognition in late 2020 as a contestant on the first cycle of Indonesia's Next Top Model broadcast on NET., where she finished in 9th place at age 17. Following her stint on the television show, she regularly walked the runway at major national fashion events, including Indonesia Fashion Week.

=== Pageantry ===
==== Miss Indonesia 2025 ====
Callista was selected to represent the province of DKI Jakarta at the 19th edition of the Miss Indonesia competition.

The grand finale took place on 9 July 2025 at the RCTI+ Studio in Jakarta. At the end of the event, Callista was crowned Miss Indonesia 2025 by her predecessor, Monica Kezia Sembiring of North Sumatra, alongside guest of honor Miss World 2025, Opal Suchata Chuangsri of Thailand.

==== Miss World 2026 ====
As Miss Indonesia 2025, Callista was designated as the official representative for Indonesia at the Miss World 2026 pageant. As part of her official "Beauty with a Purpose" social initiative for Miss World, she spearheaded a solar-powered electrification project providing green electricity to rural areas in East Sumba, East Nusa Tenggara.

== Filmography ==
=== Television ===
Year	Title	Role	Network	Notes
2020–2021	Indonesia's Next Top Model (cycle 1)	Herself (Contestant)	NET.	Finished 9th place
2025	Miss Indonesia 2025	Herself (Contestant / Winner)	RCTI	Represented DKI Jakarta

Awards and achievements
Preceded by Monica Kezia (North Sumatra)	Miss Indonesia; 2025	Succeeded by Alda Callista (Central Papua)
