= Mek people =

Regions with significant populations
- Indonesia (Highland Papua)

Languages
- Mek languages, Indonesian language

The Mek are a Papuan people living in Dirwemna and Puldama, Yahukimo Regency, Highland Papua, Indonesia. They are closely related to Ketengban people in Pegunungan Bintang Regency.

A television series on The Discovery Channel titled Living with the Mek was aired in 2008.

== See also ==
- Indigenous people of New Guinea
