= Ketengban language =

Language in Indonesia

Ketengban
- Oktengban
- Region: Highland Papua
- Ethnicity: Ketengban
- Native speakers: (10,000 cited 2000)
- Language family: Trans–New Guinea: Mek; Eastern; Ketengban

Language codes
- ISO 639-3: xte
- Glottolog: kete1254

Ketengban, also known as Kupel, is a Papuan language spoken in Pegunungan Bintang Regency, Highland Papua, Indonesia, near the Papua New Guinea border.

Dialects are Okbab (Okbap), Bime, Onya (Eastern Una; cf. Una), Omban (Kamume), Sirkai.
