= Dekai =

- Town
- Location in Western New Guinea and Indonesia Dekai (Indonesia)
- Coordinates: 4°51′33″S 139°28′26″E
- Country: Indonesia
- Region: Western New Guinea
- Province: (Papua (province)) Highland Papua

Population (2010)
  - Total: 3,419
- Time zone: UTC+9 (Indonesia Eastern Time)
- Climate: Af

Dekai is a town in the province of Highland Papua, Indonesia, and the actual administrative center of Yahukimo Regency. The official administrative center of Yahukimo Regency is Sumohai. Sumohai is located 25 kilometers north of Dekai, and due to the lack of infrastructure in Sumohai, the administrative center of Yahukimo Regency is in Dekai. In the 2010 census, Dekai's Suma District (Indonesian: Distrik Sumo) had a total of 3,419 people.

The town is located on the Bulaza River (Indonesian: Sungai Brazza) and the Dykno Puglia Airport is located in the northwest of the town.

== Transportation ==
The town has its own airport Nop Goliat Dekai Airport.

== Climate ==
Dekai has a tropical rainforest climate (Af) with heavy to very heavy rainfall year-round.

Climate data for Dekai
Month	Jan	Feb	Mar	Apr	May	Jun	Jul	Aug	Sep	Oct	Nov	Dec	Year
Mean daily maximum °C (°F)	31.2 (88.2)	31.0 (87.8)	31.1 (88.0)	31.1 (88.0)	30.8 (87.4)	29.8 (85.6)	29.1 (84.4)	29.4 (84.9)	30.1 (86.2)	30.9 (87.6)	31.4 (88.5)	31.3 (88.3)	30.6 (87.1)
Daily mean °C (°F)	27.1 (80.8)	26.9 (80.4)	27.0 (80.6)	27.1 (80.8)	26.9 (80.4)	26.1 (79.0)	25.6 (78.1)	25.7 (78.3)	26.2 (79.2)	26.6 (79.9)	27.1 (80.8)	27.3 (81.1)	26.6 (80.0)
Mean daily minimum °C (°F)	23.0 (73.4)	22.8 (73.0)	23.0 (73.4)	23.1 (73.6)	23.0 (73.4)	22.5 (72.5)	22.2 (72.0)	22.1 (71.8)	22.3 (72.1)	22.4 (72.3)	22.9 (73.2)	23.3 (73.9)	22.7 (72.9)
Average precipitation mm (inches)	318 (12.5)	335 (13.2)	399 (15.7)	369 (14.5)	325 (12.8)	257 (10.1)	305 (12.0)	328 (12.9)	325 (12.8)	281 (11.1)	258 (10.2)	278 (10.9)	3,778 (148.7)
Source: Climate-Data.org
