= Audrey Vanessa =

Indonesian model and beauty pageant titleholder

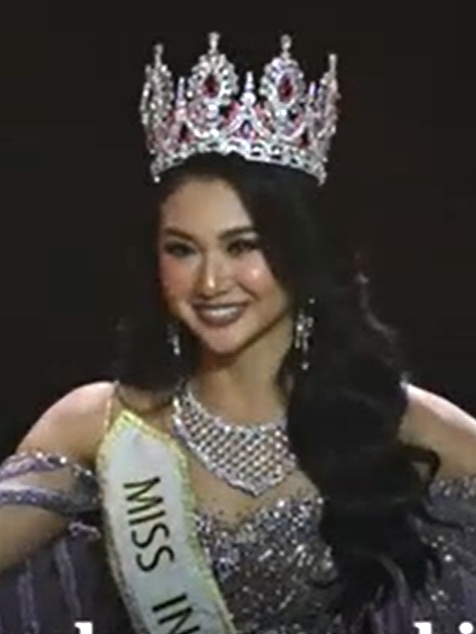
- Vanessa in 2024
- Born: Audrey Vanessa Susilo; 23 December 1999 (age 26); Manado, North Sulawesi, Indonesia
- Education: Manado Independent School; Monash University
- Beauty pageant titleholder
- Title: Miss Indonesia 2022
- Major competitions: Miss Indonesia 2022; (Miss Talent); Miss World 2023; (Top 40)

Audrey Vanessa Susilo (born 23 December 1999), better known as Audrey Vanessa, is an Indonesian beauty pageant titleholder who won the title of Miss Indonesia 2022 representing North Sulawesi.

Audrey represented Indonesia at Miss World 2023, where and reached the top 40.

== Early life and education ==
Audrey Vanessa Susilo was born on 23 December 1999 in Manado, North Sulawesi, Indonesia.

She earned a bachelor's degree in Accounting from Monash University in Melbourne, Australia. At the time she was crowned Miss Indonesia 2022, she was pursuing a master's degree in Banking and Finance at the same university.

Audrey is active in environmental conservation. She founded REFORMERS, a charity initiative focused on coral reef conservation and revitalizing the economy of traditional fishing communities in Indonesia, particularly in North Sulawesi.

== Pageantry ==
=== Miss Indonesia 2022 ===
Audrey began her beauty pageant career by representing North Sulawesi at the Miss Indonesia 2022 pageant, held on 15 September 2022 at RCTI+ Studios in Jakarta after the 2021 edition was cancelled due to the COVID-19 pandemic.

In the Top 5 round, Audrey was asked by judge Liliana Tanoesoedibjo about the meaning of the Beauty with a Purpose title carried by Miss Indonesia. She answered that the title is more than a crown, as it requires responsibility to use one's voice to help people in need.

At the end of the competition, Audrey was crowned by the outgoing titleholder Carla Yules of South Sulawesi. She became the second contestant from North Sulawesi to win the Miss Indonesia title after Kristania Virginia Besouw in 2006.

In addition to winning the competition, Audrey also received the Miss Talent and Miss Social Media fast-track awards, becoming the first contestant in Miss Indonesia history to win both categories in the same edition.

=== Miss World 2023 ===
As the winner of Miss Indonesia 2022, Audrey represented Indonesia at the Miss World 2023 pageant, held on 9 March 2024 at the Jio World Convention Centre in Mumbai, India. She advanced to the Top 40 of the competition.

== Life after Miss World ==
Following her participation at the Miss World 2023 pageant, Audrey continued to advocate against child sexual abuse through her Break the Silence campaign. The initiative aims to educate children about sexual abuse prevention, encourage survivors to speak up, and raise public awareness about protecting women and children from sexual violence. Audrey also visited schools in several Indonesian cities to conduct educational outreach and community engagement activities.

In May 2024, Audrey attended the final of the Miss Indonesia 2024 pageant, where she concluded her reign as Miss Indonesia before her successor was crowned.

Awards and achievements
Preceded by (South Sulawesi) Carla Yules	Miss World Indonesia; 2023	Succeeded by (North Sumatra) Monica Kezia Sembiring
Preceded by (South Sulawesi) Carla Yules	Miss Indonesia; 2022	Succeeded by (North Sumatra) Monica Kezia Sembiring
Preceded by Gabrielle Valencia Sumual	Miss North Sulawesi; 2022	Succeeded by Pingkan Engelina Putri Mirah
