= Monica Kezia =

Indonesian model and beauty pageant titleholder

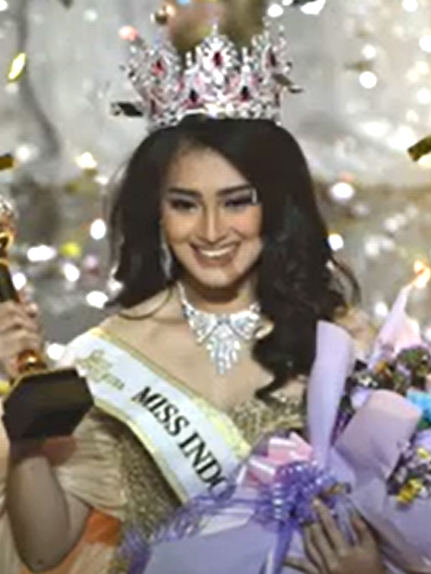
- Education: Diponegoro University
- Beauty pageant titleholder
- Title: Miss Indonesia 2024
- Hair color: Black
- Eye color: Black
- Major competitions: Miss Indonesia 2024; (Winner); Miss World 2025; (Top 40)

Monica Kezia Sembiring is a model and Indonesian beauty pageant titleholder who crowned as Miss Indonesia 2024. She represented Indonesia at Miss World 2025 in India and finished among Top 40 quarter-finalist.

== Early life and education ==
Monica Kezia Sembiring was born on January 5, 2002, in Bandung, and raised in Medan, the capital of North Sumatra province. She is the eldest of two children, born to Rezeki Sembiring Kembaren, a father from Kutambaru, Langkat Regency, and Debora Munthe, a mother from Kabanjahe, Karo Regency.

In 2019, Monica completed her high school education at SMA Negeri 1 Medan in Medan. She then continued her higher education studies in Chemical Engineering at Diponegoro University in Semarang Regency, Central Java, graduating in 2019 with a Bachelor of Engineering (S.T.) degree and cum laude honors.

== Pageantry ==
=== Miss Indonesia 2024 ===
After winning the title of Miss North Sumatra 2024, Monica represented the province of North Sumatra in the national beauty pageant, Miss Indonesia 2024, held at RCTI+ Studios in Jakarta on May 29, 2024. On the coronation night, Monica made it to the finals and was ultimately crowned the winner of Miss Indonesia 2024. She was crowned by her predecessors, Audrey Vanessa Susilo from North Sulawesi and Krystyna Pyszková, Miss World 2024 from the Czech Republic. With this victory, Monica became the first woman from North Sumatra to win the Miss Indonesia title since the pageant's inception.

=== Miss World 2025 ===
As the winner of Miss Indonesia 2024, Monica is entitled to represent Indonesia in the international beauty pageant, Miss World 2025. The pageant will be held on May 31, 2025, at the HITEX Exhibition Centre, Hyderabad, Telangana, India.

In the pre-final events, Monica managed to win the Miss Talent fast track for musical talent performance―making her a direct entry into the Top 40. On the coronation night, she was not announced as having made it to the next round of cuts, before the contest was won by Suchata Chuangsri from Thailand.

At the end of the event, Monica was also announced as the winner of the prestigious Beauty with a Purpose award for her project "Pipeline for Lifeline". This project focuses on providing clean water, sanitation, and plumbing systems to underprivileged communities in Indonesia. The project was recognized for its positive impact on the Ciseke community in Padarincang, Serang, Banten, where it was implemented. The project involved building a clean water system using pipes from the Cirahab spring. This initiative goes beyond providing water; it also aims to restore health, dignity, and hope to the community.

Awards and achievements
Preceded by Megan Lisandra Elmira Kilsch	Miss North Sumatra; 2024	Succeeded by Cyndi Patricia Figo
Preceded by (North Sulawesi) Audrey Vanessa	Miss Indonesia; 2024	Succeeded by (Jakarta) Audrey Bianca
Preceded by (North Sulawesi) Audrey Vanessa	Miss World Indonesia; 2024	Succeeded by (Jakarta) Audrey Bianca
