= Highland Papua =

Province in Western New Guinea, Indonesia

Highland Papua Papua Pegunungan Lano Pago (La Pago)
- Province with special status
- Province of Highland Papua; Provinsi Papua Pegunungan
- Coat of arms
- Motto(s): Bangkit Bersama Membangun "Rise Together to Develop"
- Highland Papua in Indonesia
- Interactive map of Highland Papua
- Country: Indonesia
- Region: Western New Guinea (Eastern Indonesia)
- Established: 25 July 2022
- Capital: Jayawijaya

Government
  - Body: Highland Papua Provincial Government
  - Governor: John Tabo (Golkar)
  - Vice Governor: Ones Pahabol
  - Legislature: Highland Papua House of Representatives (DPRPP)

Area
  - Total: 52,508.66 km^{2} (20,273.71 sq mi)

Population (mid 2025 estimate)
  - Total: 1,484,870
  - Density: 28.2786/km^{2} (73.2412/sq mi)

Languages
  - Official language: Indonesian
  - Native languages of Highland Papua: Dani, Eipomek, Hubla, Ketengban, Kimyal, Lani, Lepki, Momuna, Nduga, Ngalum, Nggem, Walak, Yali, Yetfa, and Others
  - Also spoken: Toraja, Papuan Malay, and others

Demographics
  - Religions: Christianity 97.90%; Protestantism 90.29%; Catholicism 7.61%; Islam 1.92%; Traditional religion 0.15%; Others 0.03%
  - Ethnic groups: Native: Dani, Hupla, Ketengban, Lani, Mek, Nduga, Ngalum, Yali; Migrant: Javanese, Moluccans, Sulawesians, and others
- Time zone: UTC+9 (Indonesia Eastern Time)
- HDI (2024): ▲0.544 (38th) – (Low)
- Website: papuapegunungan.go.id

Highland Papua (Indonesian: Papua Pegunungan, lit. 'Papua Mountains') is a province of Indonesia, which roughly follows the borders of the Papuan customary region of Lano Pago (often shortened to La Pago). It covers an area of 52,505.66 km^{2} (20,272.55 sq mi) and had a population of 1,484,870 according to the official estimates as at mid 2025 (comprising 791,070 males and 693,780 females), and increasing by about 17,000 residents per year.

Formally established on 25 July 2022 from the central and mountainous former part of the province of Papua, it is located on the central highlands of Western New Guinea, where it is the only landlocked province in Indonesia. The capital of Highland Papua is in Jayawijaya Regency, in Hubikosi District. The legal provision for the province's establishment was approved by the People's Representative Council on 30 June 2022, with the bill signed into Law No. 16/2022 by President Joko Widodo on 25 July, making it one of Indonesia's three then-youngest provinces alongside Central Papua and South Papua (which were subsequently joined by the even newer Southwest Papua Province). It borders Papua New Guinea to its east, South Papua to its south, Central Papua to its west (and southwest) and the residual Papua Province to its north.

== History ==
=== Dutch East Indies Expedition ===
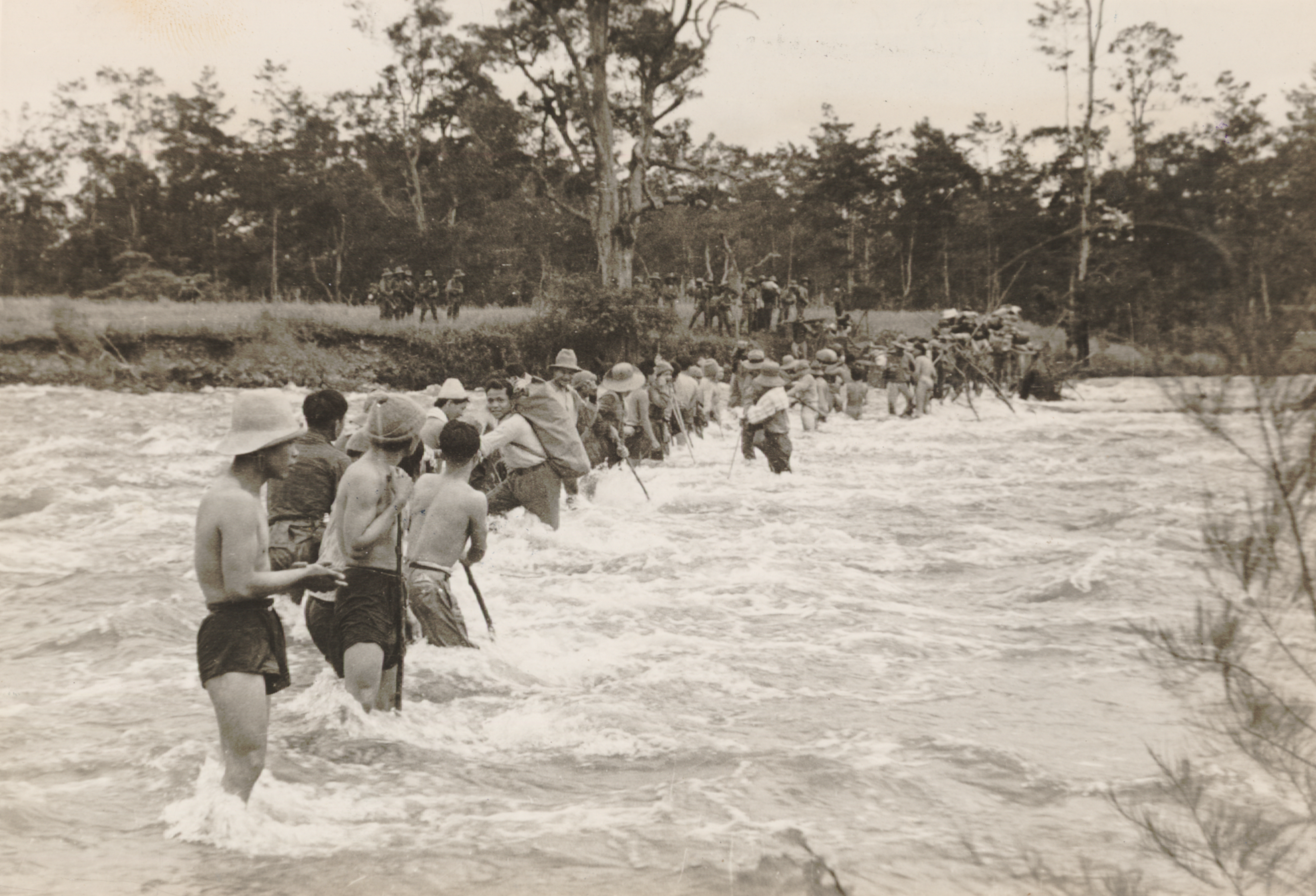
the Dayak people in the Baliem Valley formed a human chain in the river, allowing Archbold expedition members to cross

In the 17th century, sailor Jan Carstenszoon recorded the existence of high, snow-covered mountains in the middle of the island, despite its location on the equator. The Europeans referred to this area as terra incognita, meaning an uncharted and mysterious territory. It wasn't until the 20th century that the tribes residing in the Papuan Highlands Province made contact with the outside world. The first recorded contact was made during an expedition led by Hendrikus Albertus Lorentz in 1909 with representatives from Pesegem (Nduga people misidentified as Dani). The purpose of the expedition was to find a path to reach Wilhelmina Peak (now known as Trikora Peak), which is steep and covered in snow. During their journey, the expedition members rested and witnessed a traditional procession in the village of the Pesechem or Pesegem tribe. Following this initial expedition, de Bruyn, Franssen Herderschee, Karel Doorman, and others conduct their own expedition to explore and document the interior regions of Papua that had previously been unexplored by outsiders. Today, Jan Carstenszoon is remembered as the namesake of the Carstensz Pyramid, the highest peak in Oceania, and the Carstensz Range.

In 1920, van Overeem and Kremer led an expedition that successfully discovered the Swart Valley, now known as the Toli Valley in Tolikara Regency, and the Lani people who lived there. This exploration further led to the discovery of Lake Habema and allowed for access to Wilhelmina Peak from the northern side. The Baliem Valley, home to the Dani Tribe, was accidentally discovered by an expedition led by Richard Archbold from the American Museum of Natural History in 1938. This expedition was joined by dozens of Dutch soldiers and Dayak people who acted as porters. The Dutch named the Baliem Valley the Groote Vallei or the Great Valley.

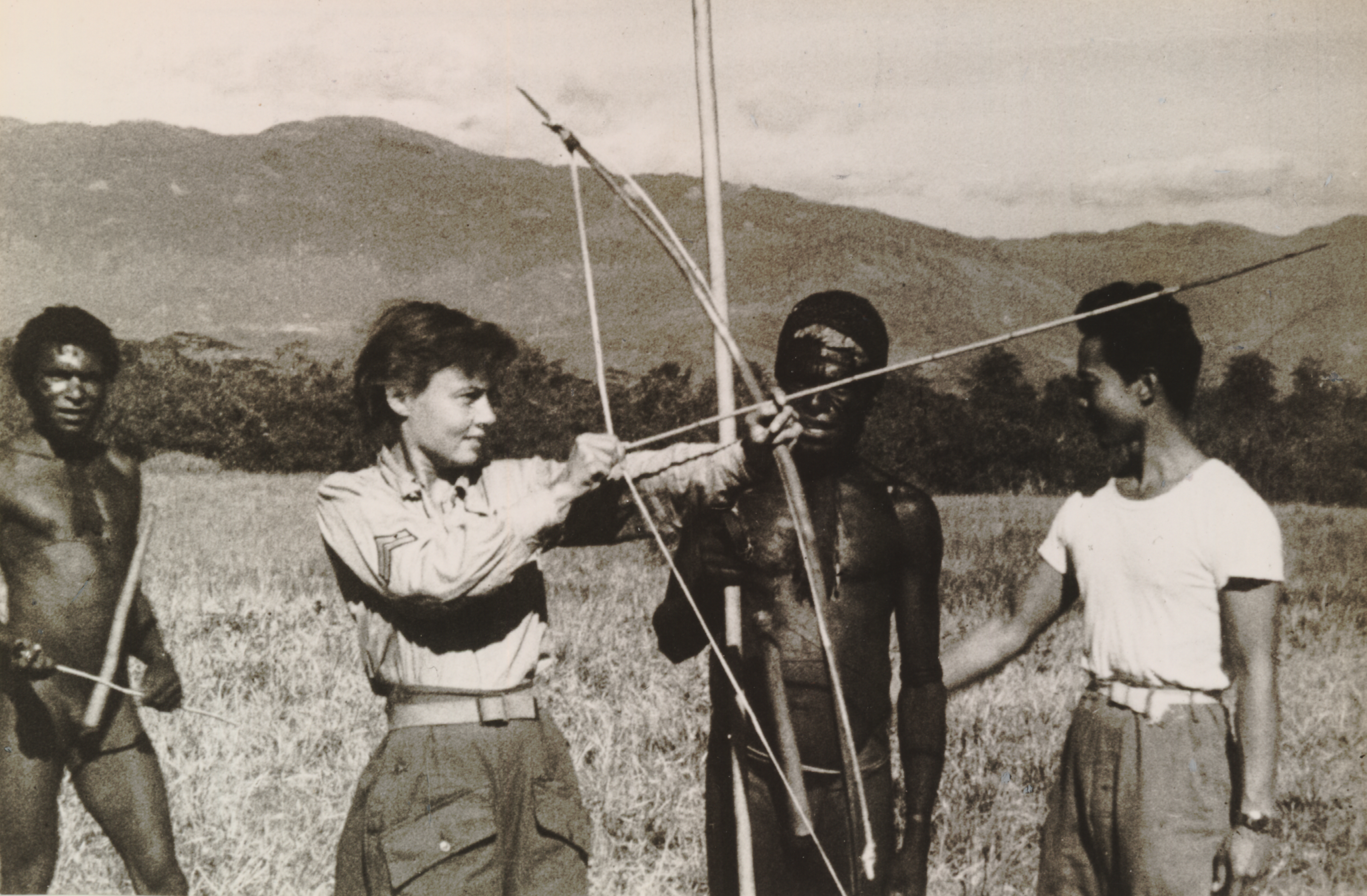
Corporal Margaret Hastings, one of the survivors of the 1945 Gremlin Special incident with the Dani and the Yali in northern Baliem Valley.

In the book titled Lost in Shangri-La published in 2011, author Mitchel Zuckoff uncovered that the region was not yet mapped during World War II. The geography of the area was treacherous with its high and cloudy mountains, dense forests, and hostile tribes, leading to numerous fatalities. The most well-known incident took place on May 13, 1945, when Gremlin Special plane crashing into a mountain in Uwambo Village, Pass Valley (now Abenaho District, Yalimo Regency), north of Baliem Valley. Following the crash, special operations were deployed, and three individuals were eventually rescued. The survival story of these individuals gained significant media attention at the time.

=== Church mission and colonial government ===
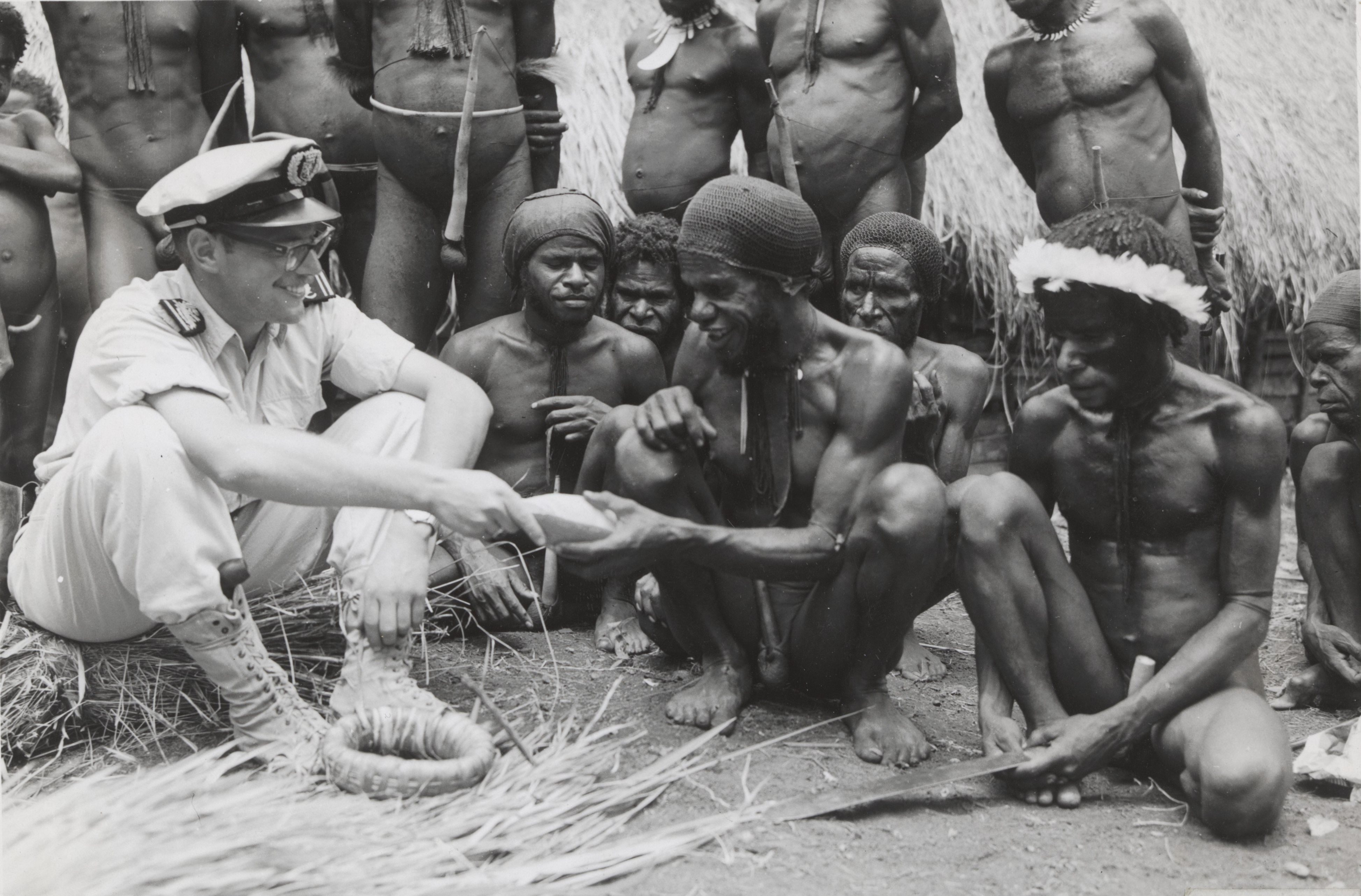
Dutch officer in Baliem Valley, 1958

In 1954, a team of missionaries from the American Christian and Missionary Alliance (C&MA), including pastors Lloyd Evan Stone and Einer Mickelson, were flown from Sentani into the Baliem Valley to introduce Christianity. Concurrently, the Dutch government, led by Frits Veldkamp, established a government post in the region to consolidate its authority in the interior. As a result, several villages, airfields, and infrastructure facilities were erected, laying the groundwork for a town that would later become known as Wamena. December 10, 1956 marked the official establishment of the Dutch government post, and the date is now commemorated as founding day of Wamena.

The Star Mountains, are located in the far eastern region near the borders of Indonesia. This area was one of the unexplored territories of the Netherlands until the Royal Netherlands Geographical Society (KNAG), or the Koninklijk Nederlandsch Aardrijkskundig Genootschap, launched an expedition in 1959. The expedition consisted of scientists from various fields, such as zoology, botany, and anthropology. The expedition members not only gained new knowledge about the region and its inhabitants but also managed to climb Juliana Peak, which is now called Mandala Peak. Prior to the expedition, a survey was conducted to find a suitable place for a camp and an airstrip. In 1955, Dutch officials such as Jan Sneep, Nol Hermans, and Pim Schoorl were sent on a small expedition to the Sibil Valley where they met the Sibil or Ngalum people. However, Dutch rule in the region was short-lived as Dutch New Guinea was annexed into Indonesia in 1963, thus ending Dutch influence in the area.

=== Under Indonesian rule ===
After control of Western New Guinea under UNTEA was incorporated into Indonesia, the government through Ministry of Home Affairs issued decision No. 37 and No. 38 of 1968 to form eight Regional People's Representative Council (DPRD) in West Irian Province. Regional council of Jayawijaya Highland was formed on 4 July 1968 to prepare for the execution of Penentuan Pendapat Rakyat or shortened to PEPERA (Act of Free Choice or Determination of the People‘s Opinion). To support PEPERA, tribal leaders from the Central Highlands of Irian, like Alex Doga, Kurulu Mabel (or in some sources Gutelu), and Ukhumiarek Asso, formed PEPERA Headquarters (which currently houses the RRI Wamena branch). Later, these tribal leaders led by Silo Doga, were invited to meet Sukarno in Merdeka Palace. There they declared their loyalty to the republic and proclaimed Sukarno as the Tribal Leader of Highland Papua through a blood oath with their thumbs. Because the blood of Doga was considered to have mixed with that of Sukarno and vice versa, he was later known as Silo Karno Doga and named his district as such. Meanwhile, PEPERA in the Jayawijaya Regency (current Highland Papua) was implemented by Deliberative Council for Determining People's Opinion in Jayawijaya Regency led by Clement Kiriwaib (former member of New Guinea Council) on 16 July 1969 in Wamena, where they agreed on two decision, West Irian is an indivisible part of Unitary State of Republic of Indonesia and will not be separated from Bangsa Indonesia (Indonesian Nation) from Sabang to Merauke. In December, the government issued Law No. 12 of 1969 concerning the Establishment of the Autonomous Province of West Irian and Autonomous Regencies in the Province of West Irian. One of them was Jayawijaya Regency which included the Local Government areas of Baliem, Bokondini, Tiom, and Oksibil.

This regency was precursor of the Highland Papua Province. On 11 December 2002, Jayawijaya Regency was divided into Jayawijaya, Yahukimo, Bintang Mountains (Pegunungan Bintang), and Tolikara Regencies. Then on 4 January 2008, the remaining Jayawijaya Regency was again divided into Jayawijaya, Lanny Jaya, Nduga, Central Mamberamo (Mamberamo Tengah), and Yalimo Regencies. These eight regencies which had originally comprised the Jayawijaya Regency were finally reunited into the Highland Papua Province in 2022.

Since it was incorporated to Indonesia, this area has been marked by acts of violence by the pro-independence group Free Papua Organization (OPM). Several incidents caused by Free Papua Organization include research team hostage in Mapenduma in 1996, killing of Istaka Karya workers who were building a bridge in Nduga in 2018, and the burning of high schools and health centers along with the killing of health workers in the Pegunungan Bintang Regency. In the highlands of Papua, there are also frequent community unrest which caused material losses and casualties, for example the burning of government offices in Yalimo due to the 2021 regional elections, riots in Wamena in 2019 that killed 10 Minang migrants, and clashes between tribes of Lanny Jaya (predominantly Lani and Dani) against Nduga in Wouma District, Jayawijaya Regency using arrows and burning houses in 2022.

=== Formation of Highland Papua Province ===
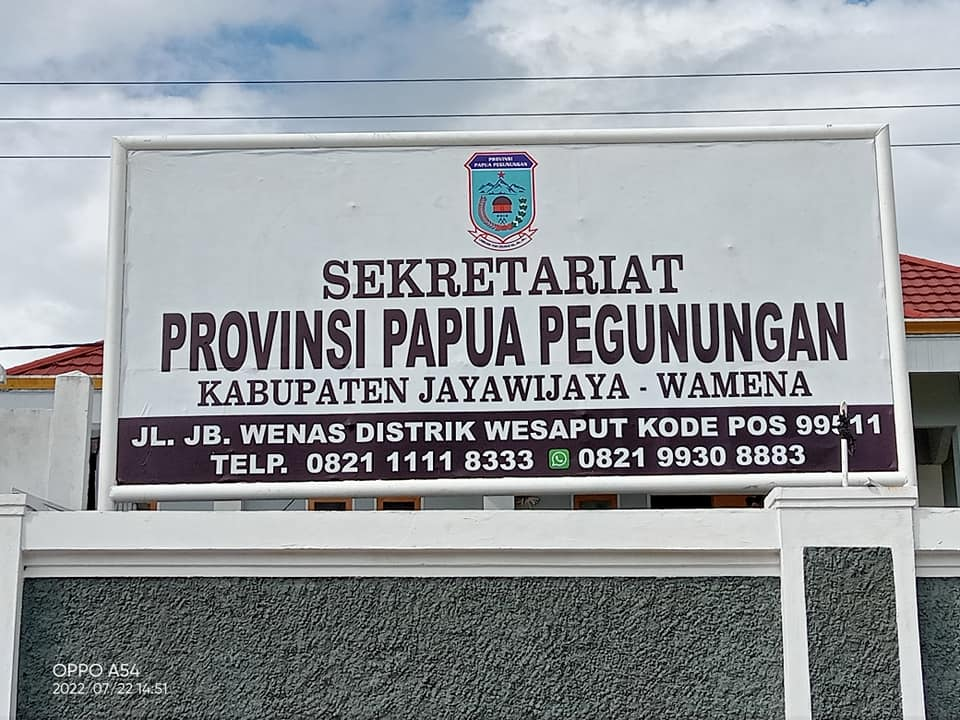
Highland Papua Provincial Secretariat Office.

Highland Papua was formally enacted on 25 July 2022, along with South Papua and Central Papua, and was inaugurated on 12 November. Soon after the approval of the bill for the creation of the province on 30 June, Pegunungan Bintang Regency objected to their inclusion in the new province, stating that their access to public services are much closer to Jayapura than to Wamena, and demanded to stay instead within Papua province or to be created as a new province of Okmekmin (its residents had been advocating for a new cultural region of Okmekmin as they consider themselves different from other La Pago tribes). But their inclusion was rejected by Tabi customary council of the original Papua province as well as from the South and Highlands. Local government officials and some residents of the regency threatened to secede and join Papua New Guinea if their demands were not met.

On 16 July when the province was waiting to be formalized, TPNPB gunmen shot and killed eleven civilians (mostly traders from other islands) and injured two others in the village of Nogolait, Nduga Regency. On 22 July, the Highland Papua Secretariat Office was established in Wesaput District, Jayawijaya Regency, by the Tim Daerah Otonomi Baru (DOB) Provinsi Papua Pegunungan, an advocacy group for the formation of the Highland Papua autonomous region, to be the center of information for the new province.

After Law no. 16 of 2022 was inaugurated, the regents in the new province collaborated with the Ministry of Home Affairs through the Kelompok Kerja (Pokja) III Task Force to support the New Autonomous Region to establish the location of the governor's office and temporary service, the provisional budget prior to the regional elections, the State Civil Apparatus (ASN), as well as grants from each regencies, the parent province, and the central government. Pokja also reviewed the potential location of the future Provincial Government office centre with alternatives offered between Muliama District, Wamena, Megapura, or Hubikiak. Meanwhile, the temporary governor's office is located at the Education Office of Jayawijaya Regency although there are other recommendations such as the Wamena Mall. The temporary governor's office sign was installed on 6 September 2022 but was vandalised a day later by 9 members of the Jayawijaya Regency Student Association (HMKJ) who were eventually arrested by the police. Originally the provincial capital was decided to be in Jayawijaya Regency, specifically near the border of Welesi and Wouma Districts. However there was rejection due to the region considered fertile land, in addition no progress was made in constructing the Governor's office during the two years term of acting Governor Kondomo and Wanggai. Hence, The elected Governor John Tabo decided to move the capital to Gunung Susu, in Hubikosi District, after the land was granted by Jayawijaya Government.

== Politics ==
=== Government ===
The province follows the original administrative boundaries of Jayawijaya Regency as it existed between 1969 and December 2002. Culturally, Highland Papua roughly covers the customary region of La Pago, which include the unrecognized customary region of Okmekmin.

=== Administrative regencies ===
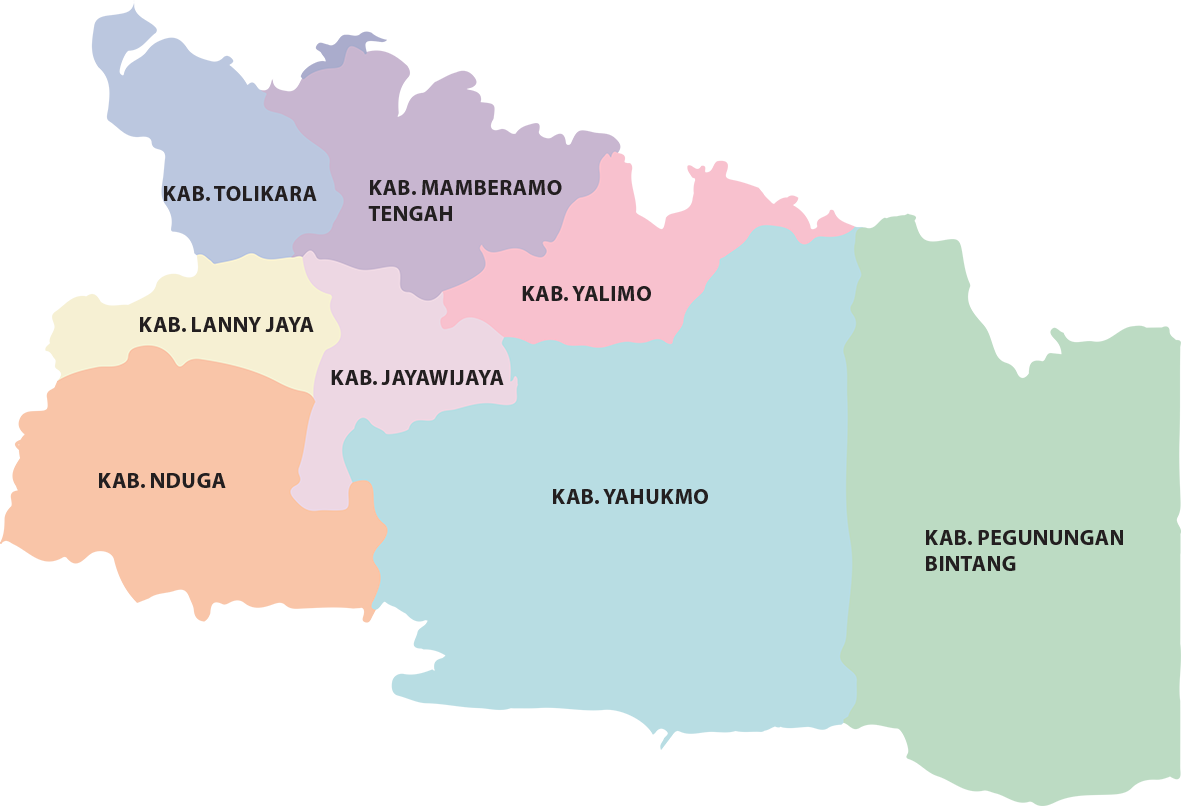

The new province comprises eight regencies (kabupaten), listed below with their areas and their populations at the 2020 Census and according to the official estimates as at mid 2025. Until 2002 all eight of the current regencies now comprising this province were part of a larger Jayawijaya Regency, but on 11 December 2002 three new regencies were created from parts of that regency - Pegunungan Bintang (Star Mountains), Tolikara and Yahukimo. Subsequently, on 4 January 2008 another four new regencies were created from other parts of Jayawijaya Regency - Lanny Jaya, Mamberamo Tengah (Central Mamberamo), Nduga and Yalimo.

Administrative divisions of Highland Papua
Region Code	Name of Regency	Capital	Area in km^{2}	Pop'n Census 2010	Pop'n Census 2020	Pop'n Estimate mid 2025	HDI (2020)
95.01	Jayawijaya Regency	Wamena	2,629.01	196,085	269,553	283,890	0.580 (Medium)
95.02	Pegunungan Bintang Regency	Oksibil	13,751.92	65,434	77,872	^{(a)} 84,710	0.454 (Low)
95.03	Yahukimo Regency	Dekai	16,365.94	164,512	350,880	377,490	0.494 (Low)
95.04	Tolikara Regency	Karubaga	4,285.33	114,427	236,986	248,310	0.495 (Low)
95.05	Mamberamo Tengah Regency	Kobagma	4,101.49	39,537	50,685	54,370	0.476 (Low)
95.06	Yalimo Regency	Elelim	3,148.31	50,763	101,973	109,880	0.483 (Low)
95.07	Lanny Jaya Regency	Tiom	2,339.78	148,522	196,399	211,330	0.479 (Low)
95.08	Nduga Regency	Kenyam	5,886.89	79,053	106,533	114,890	0.316 (Low)
Totals			52,505.66	858,333	1,390,881	1,484,870	0.483 (Low)

Note: (a) The Regency's own estimate for mid-2024 was 114,581.

The province now forms one of Indonesia's 84 national electoral districts to elect members to the People's Representative Council. The Highland Papua Electoral District consists of all of the 8 regencies in the province, and elects 3 members to the People's Representative Council.

=== Administrative districts (distrik) ===
1. Jayawijaya Regency is composed of the following 40 administrative Districts: Asologaima, Asolokobal, Asotipo, Bolakme, Bpiri, Bugi, Hubikiak, Hubikosi, Ibele, Itlay Hisage, Koragi, Kurulu, Libarek, Maima, Molagalome, Muliama, Musatfak, Napua, Pelebaga, Piramid, Pisugi, Popugoba, Siepkosi, Silo Karno Doga, Taelarek, Tagime, Tagineri, Trikora, Usilimo, Wadangku, Walaik, Walelagama, Wame, Wamena, Welesi, Wesaput, Wita Waya, Wollo, Wouma, Yalengga.
2. Pegunungan Bintang Regency is composed of the following 34 administrative Districts: Aboy, Alemsom, Awinbon, Batani, Batom, Bime, Borme, Eipumek, Iwur, Jetfa, Kalomdol, Kawor, Kiwirok, Kiwirok Timur, Mofinop, Murkim, Nongme, Ok Aom, Okbab, Okbape, Okbemtau, Okbibab, Okhika, Oklip, Oksamol, Oksebang, Oksibil, Oksop, Pamek, Pepera, Serambakon, Tarup, Teiraplu, Weime.
3. Yahukimo Regency is composed of the following 51 administrative Districts: Amuma, Anggruk, Bomela, Dekai, Dirwemna, Duram, Endomen, Hereapini, Hilipuk, Hogio, Holuon, Kabianggama, Kayo, Kona, Korupun, Kosarek, Kurima, Kwelemdua, Kwikma, Langda, Lolat, Mugi, Musaik, Nalca, Ninia, Nipsan, Obio, Panggema, Pasema, Pronggoli, Puldama, Samenage, Sela, Seredela, Silimo, Soba, Sobaham, Soloikma, Sumo, Suntamon, Suru Suru, Talambo, Tangma, Ubahak, Ubalihi, Ukha, Walma, Werima, Wusama, Yahuliambut, Yogosem.
4. Tolikara Regency is composed of the following 46 administrative Districts: Airgaram, Anawi, Aweku, Bewani, Biuk, Bogonuk, Bokondini, Bokoneri, Danime, Dow, Dundu, Egiam, Geya, Gika, Gilubandu, Goyage, Gundagi, Kai, Kamboneri, Kanggime, Karubaga, Kembu, Kondaga, Kuari, Kubu, Li Anogomma, Nabunage, Nelawi, Numba, Nunggawi, Panaga, Poganeri, Tagime, Tagineri, Telenggeme, Timori, Umagi, Wakuwo, Wari/Taiyeve II, Wenam, Wina, Woniki, Wugi, Wunim, Yuko, Yuneri.
5. Mamberamo Tengah Regency is composed of the following 5 administrative Districts: Eragayam, Ilugwa, Kelila, Kobagma, Megambilis.
6. Yalimo Regency is composed of the following 5 administrative Districts: Abenaho, Apalapsili, Benawa, Elelim, Welarek.
7. Lanny Jaya Regency is composed of the following 39 administrative Districts: Awina, Ayumnati, Balingga, Balingga Barat, Bruwa, Buguk Gona, Dimba, Gamelia, Gelok Beam, Goa Balim, Gollo, Guna, Gupura, Karu, Kelulome, Kolawa, Kuly Lanny, Kuyawage, Lannyna, Makki, Melagi, Melagineri, Milimbo, Mokoni, Muara, Nikogwe, Niname, Nogi, Pirime, Poga, Tiom, Tiom Ollo, Tiomneri, Wano Barat, Wereka, Wiringgambut, Yiginua, Yiluk, Yugungwi.
8. Nduga Regency is composed of the following 32 administrative Districts: Alama, Dal, Embetpen, Gearek, Geselma, Inikgal, Iniye, Kegayem, Kenyam, Kilmid, Kora, Koroptak, Krepkuri, Mam, Mapenduma, Mbua Tengah, Mbulmu Yalma, Mbuwa, Mebarok, Moba, Mugi, Nenggeagin, Nirkuri, Paro, Pasir Putih, Pija, Wosak, Wusi, Wutpaga, Yal, Yenggelo, Yigi.

== Geography ==
According to Statistics Indonesia, Highland Papua's land area is 51,213.33 km^{2}. Highland Papua is the first and only province in Indonesia without a seacoast (i.e. it is landlocked).

=== Topography ===
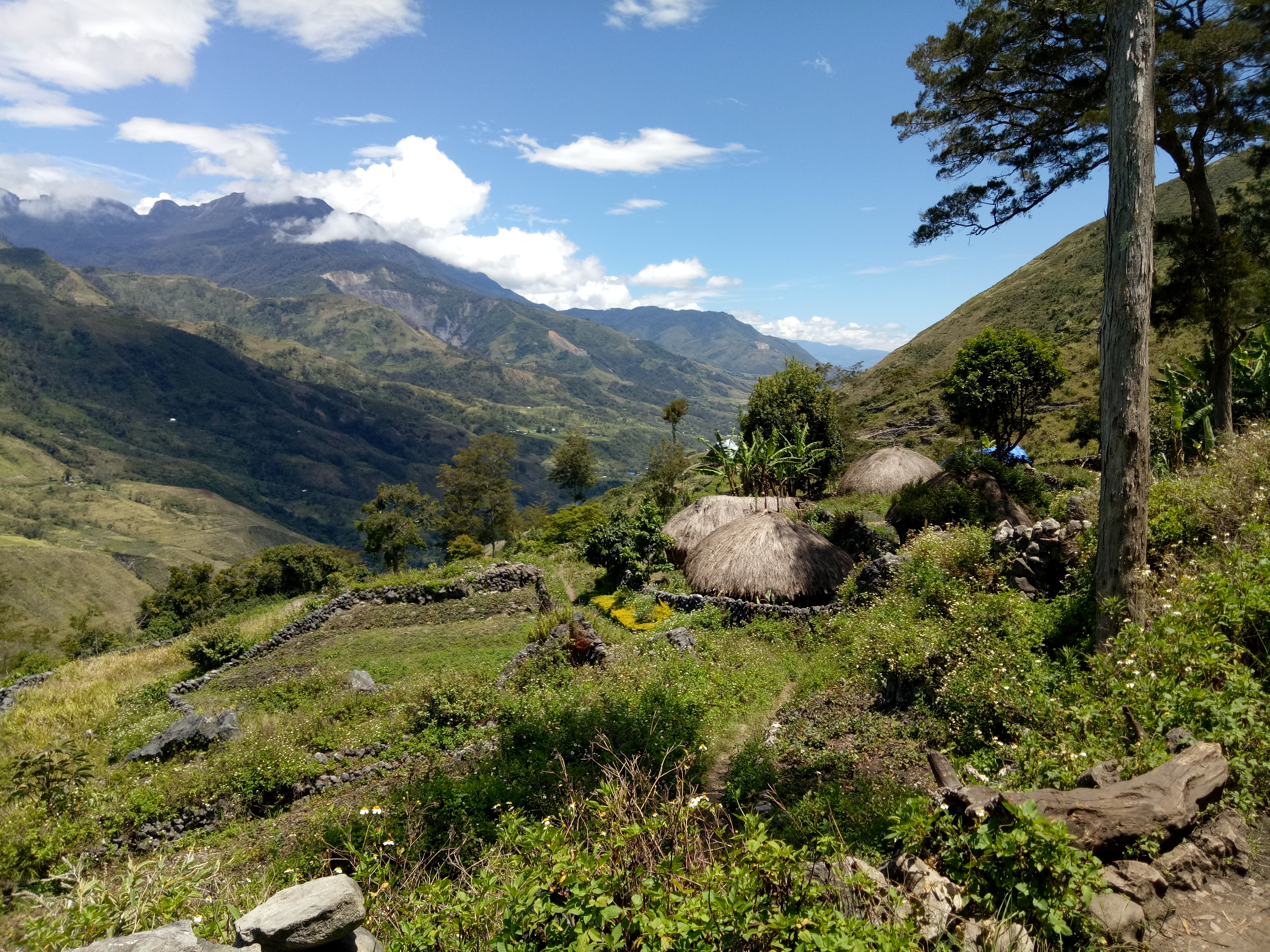
Parela Village, Kurima District, Yahukimo in the Baliem Valley with mountains in the background

Highland Papua presents a picturesque landscape characterized by deep valleys bordered by imposing mountains, attracting adventurers seeking unique experiences. Facilitated by tour guides, travelers can embark on expeditions to explore scattered traditional villages nestled within these valleys, each adorned with traditional dwellings and lifestyles emblematic of the region's cultural heritage. However, accessing these settlements entails traversing rugged terrains fraught with hazards, including steep gradients, precarious ravines, and river crossings.

Highland Papua predominantly consisted of highlands referred to as the New Guinea Highlands, spanning from Central Papua to Papua New Guinea. The Jayawijaya Mountains are located on the Indonesian side of the New Guinea Highlands. This range encompasses peaks exceeding 4000 meters above sea level. Notable peaks within this province include Puncak Trikora, towering at 4,760 meters, and Puncak Mandala, reaching 4,750 meters above sea level. Nestled amidst these lofty peaks are valleys with elevations surpassing 1,500 metres above sea level. Renowned for their fertility, these valleys serve as location for traditional settlement and agricultural land, primarily cultivating sweet potatoes, a staple food among local tribes. Examples of such valleys include the Baliem Valley in Jayawijaya Regency and the Toli Valley in Tolikara Regency. Moreover, these mountains serve as the wellspring for major rivers on Papua Island, notably the Mamberamo River flowing north and the Digul River coursing southward.

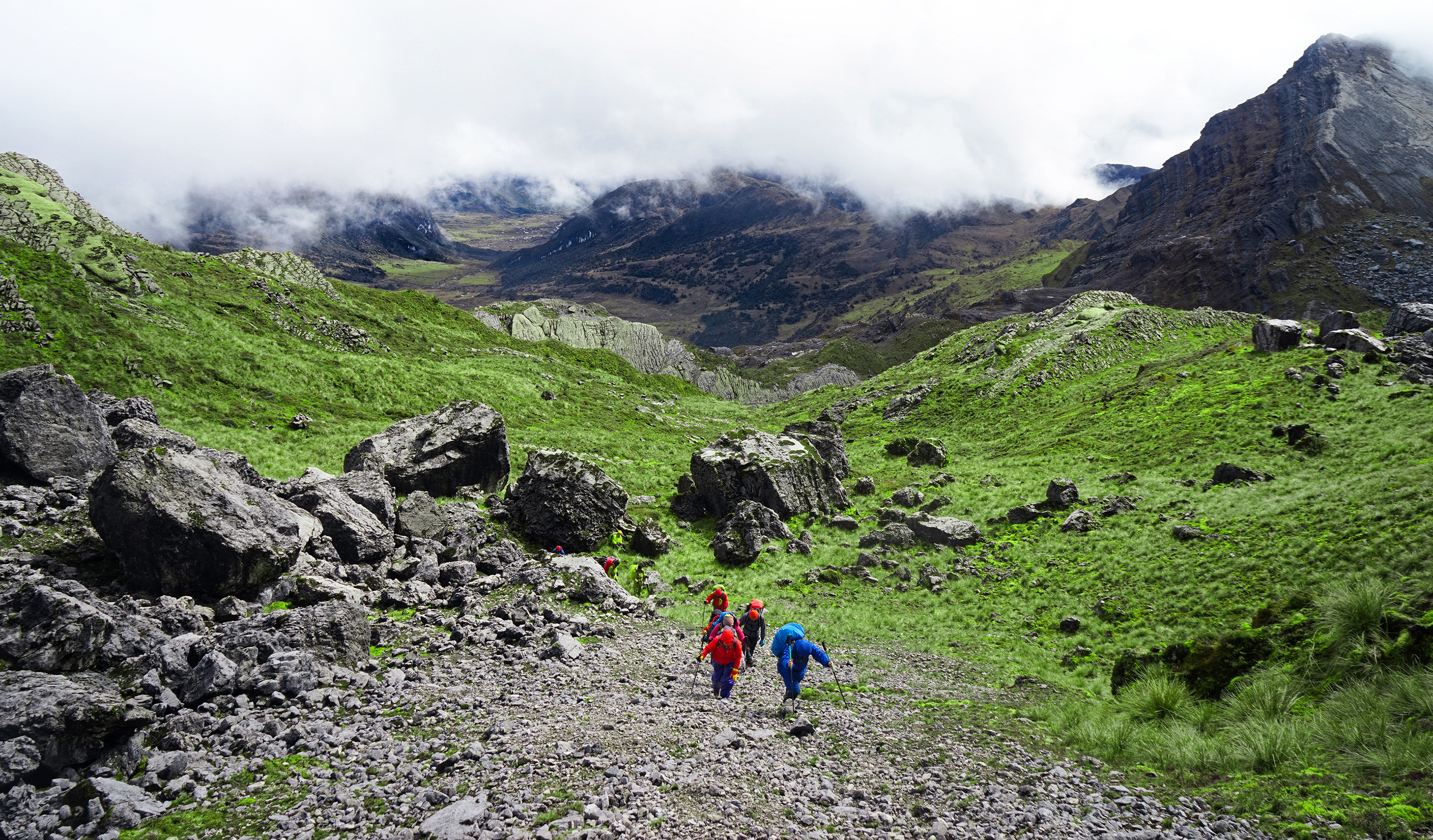
Lorentz National Park

Certain regions in this province are susceptible to frost, a consequence of extreme cold temperatures. This climatic phenomenon poses a significant threat to agriculture, often resulting in crop failures and, in severe cases, famine. One such instance occurred in Kuyawage, Lanny Jaya, where frost-induced hardships were observed. However, the delivery of aid to such areas is hindered by minimal infrastructure. In contrast, the southern and northern flanks of the Central Mountains feature lower-lying plains. These lowland areas are home to key urban centers, such as the capitals Yahukimo in Dekai and Nduga in Kenyam. While these locales are not subject to the extreme cold of the mountains, they face their own challenges. The warmer climate makes them vulnerable to malaria outbreaks, necessitating concerted efforts in disease control and prevention.

In terms of ecoregion (ecosystem and biodiversity area), Highland Papua can be divided into two. Namely the Central Range montane rain forests zone from a height of around 1,000 - 3,000 meters above sea level and the Central Range sub-alpine grasslands 3,000 meters above sea level. Its flora and fauna are similar to Australia such as bird-of-paradise and echidna. One of the conservation areas established to protect this region is Lorentz National Park, which is the largest national park in Southeast Asia.

== Demographics ==
Historical population
Year	Pop.	±%
1971	174,872	—
1980	257,791	+47.4%
1990	347,612	+34.8%
2000	877,300	+152.4%
2010	858,333	−2.2%
2020	1,390,881	+62.0%
2025	1,484,870	+6.8%
Source: Statistics Indonesia 2026 and earlier versions. The eight regencies now forming Highland Papua Province were part of Papua Province until November 2022.

=== Religion ===
Religion in Highland Papua (2022)
1. Protestantism (90.5%)
2. Roman Catholicism (7.50%)
3. Islam (1.87%)
4. Others (0.18%)

== Culture ==
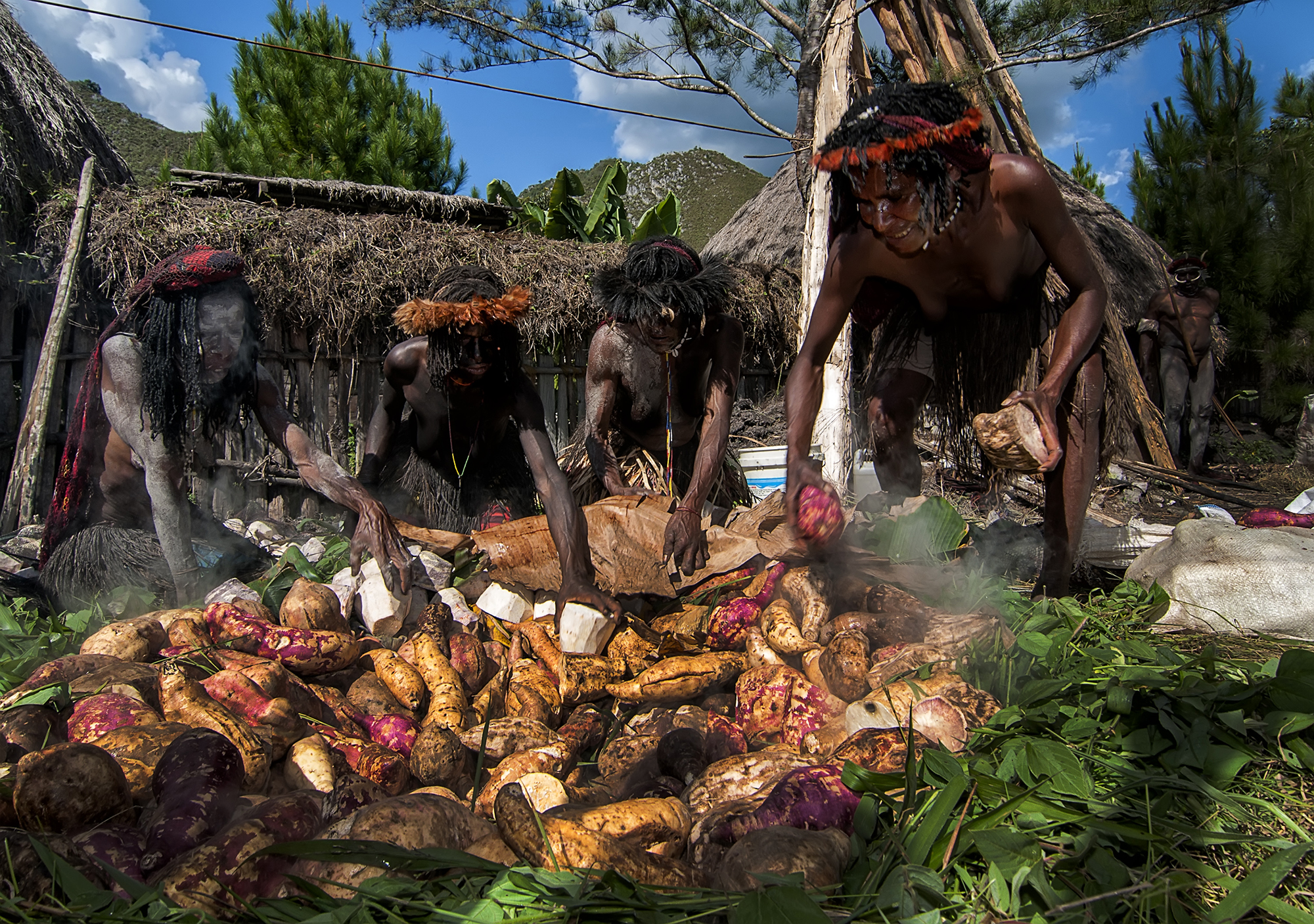
Papuan tribesmen during stone-burning ceremony

The native Papuan people has a distinct culture and traditions that cannot be found in other parts of Indonesia. Coastal Papuans are usually more willing to accept modern influence into their daily lives, which in turn diminishes their original culture and traditions. Meanwhile, most inland Papuans still preserves their original culture and traditions, although their way of life over the past century are tied to the encroachment of modernity and globalization. Each Papuan tribe usually practices their own tradition and culture, which may differ greatly from one tribe to another.

One of the most well-known Papuan tradition is the stone burning tradition (Indonesian: Tradisi Bakar Batu or Barapen), which is practiced by most Papuan tribes in the province. The stone burning tradition is an important tradition for all indigenous Papuans. For them, is a form of gratitude and a gathering place between residents of the village. This tradition is usually held when there are births, traditional marriages, the coronation of tribal chiefs, and the gathering of soldiers. The name of this tradition varies in each region. The name Barapen is from the Biak language, Lago Lakwi (Lani in Tolikara) or Logo Lakwi (Dani in Puncak), Mogo Gapil (Paniai), Kit Oba Isogoa (Wamena, Jayawijaya), Kerep Kan (Nduga), and Hupon (Pegunungan Bintang). It is called the stone-burning tradition because the stones are burned until they are hot enough to be used to cook food. Meat, sweet potatoes, and vegetables are placed on top of banana leaves, which are used to cover the hot stone surface.

The finger cutting tradition (Indonesian: Tradisi Potong Jari or Iki Paleg) is practiced among the Dani people of the Baliem Valley in central Papua. The tradition of cutting fingers on the Dani people has existed since ancient times and is still being carried out today. This tradition symbolizes harmony, unity, and strength that comes from within a person and within a family. According to the culture of the Dani people, family is the most valuable pedestal that a human has, fingers are believed to symbolize the existence and function of a family itself. So that the tradition of cutting is carried out when someone loses a family member or relative such as husband, wife, children, younger siblings and older siblings forever. For Dani people, sadness and grief due to adversity and the loss of a family member are not only appreciated by crying, but also cutting fingers. The Dani people believes that cutting off a finger is a symbol of the sadness and pain of losing a family member. The finger-cutting tradition is also seen as a way to prevent the recurrence of a catastrophe that claimed the life of a grieving family member.

A culture of inter-tribal warfare and animosity between neighboring tribes has long been present in the highlands. For example, 125 Dani villagers were killed in an attack by an enemy clan on 4 June 1966.

=== Arts and performance ===
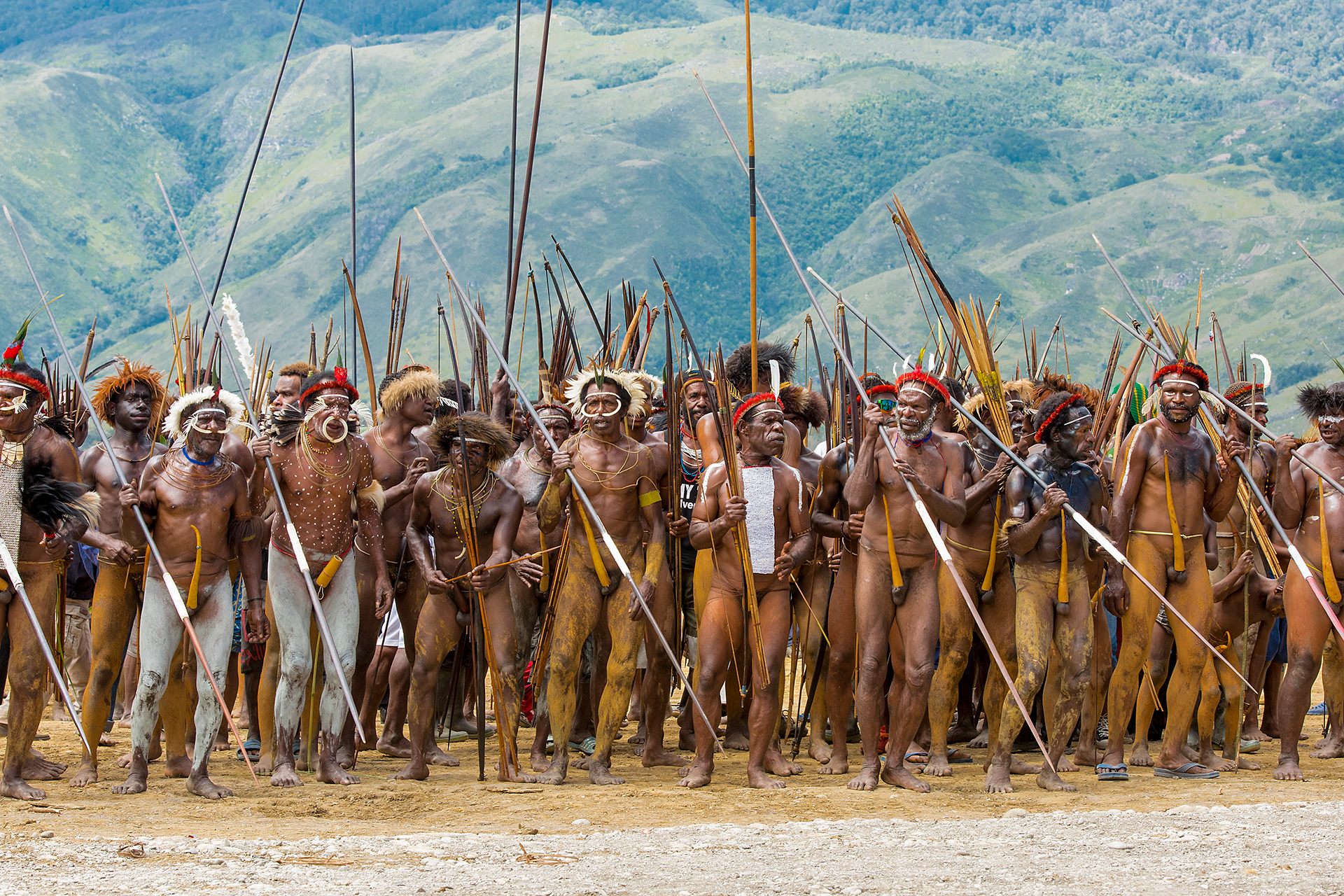
Baliem Valley Festival

There are a lot of traditional dances that are native to the province of Papua. Each Papuan tribe would usually have their own unique traditional dances.

Each Papuan tribe usually has their own war dance. The Papuan war dance is one of the oldest dances of the Papuan people because this classical dance has been around for thousands of years and is even one of the legacies of Indonesia's prehistoric times. In Papuan culture, this dance is a symbol of how strong and brave the Papuan people are. Allegedly, this dance was once a part of traditional ceremonies when fighting other tribes and now can be seen preserved during Baliem Valley Festival. The dancers who perform this dance are a group of men, the number starts from seven people or more. They danced to the sound of drums and war songs. Their movements were characteristically excited as if they were warriors heading for battle. The Papuan war dance is unique, varied and energetic to indicate the heroism and courage of the Papuan people. Apart from the dancers movements in playing the weapons they carry, the uniqueness of this dance is also seen in the dancers' clothes.

=== Architecture ===
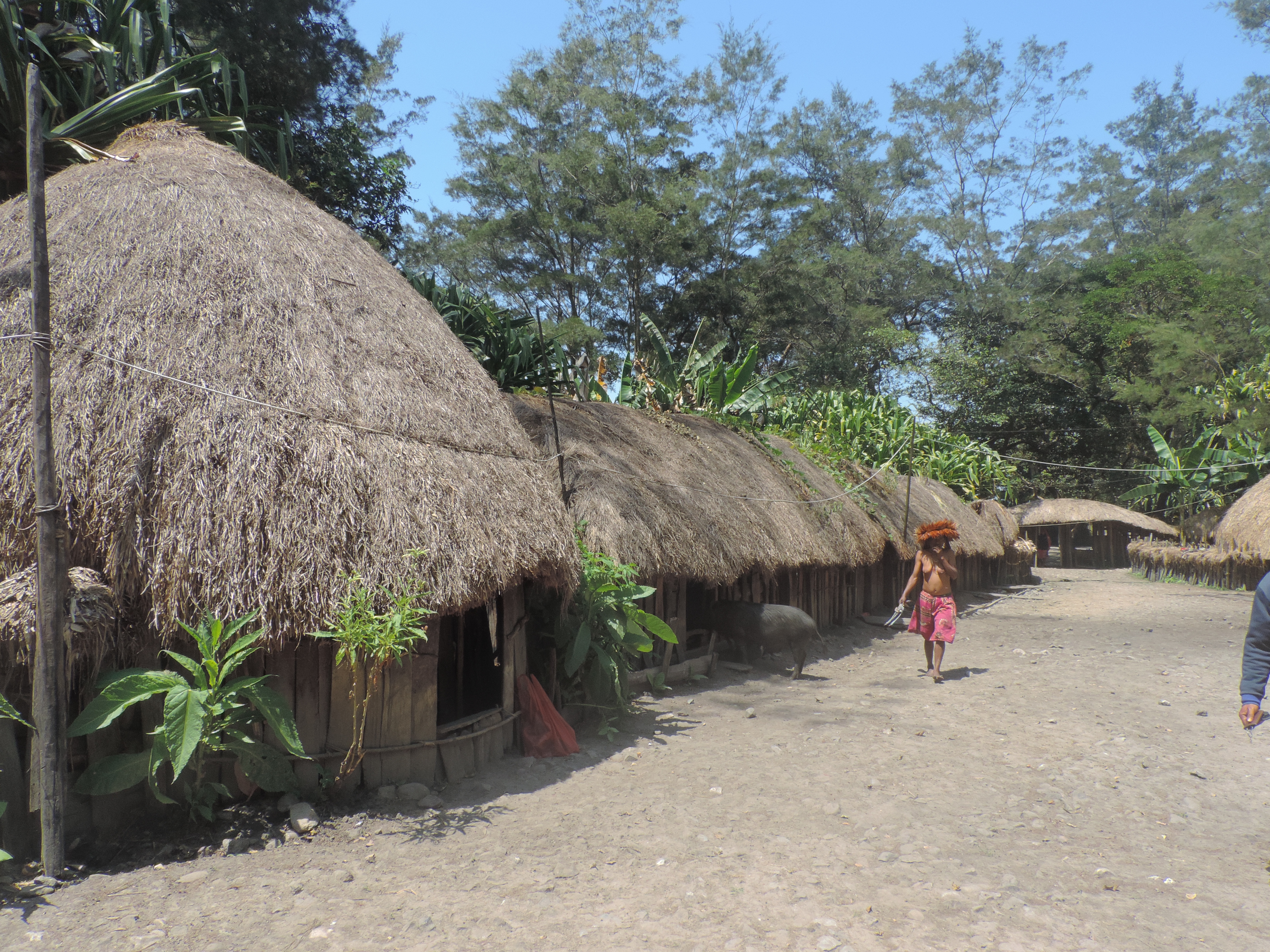
Traditional Dani houses near Wamena in the Baliem Valley

Papua is famous for its varieties of traditional houses, one of which is a traditional house called honai. Honai is a traditional Papuan house, especially in the mountainous region. The basic shape of the honai is a circle with a wooden frame and woven walls and a conical roof made of straw. The honai is spread across almost all corners of the Baliem Valley which covers an area of 1,200 square kilometres. The distance from the surface of the house to the ceiling is only about 1 metre. Within the honai, there is a fireplace which is located right in the middle. The thatched roof and wooden walls of the Honai actually bring cool air inside If the air is too cold, the whole house will be warmed by the smoke from the fireplace. For the Dani people, smoke from firewood is no longer unusual for being smoked for a long time. As long as the door is still open, oxygen can still flow inside. The honai is supported by 4 main poles called heseke, which are stuck in the ground at a certain distance (about 1 metre) so that they are square. In the middle of this main pillar is placed a fireplace called a round wulikin. An honai is made in an attic so that it is divided into two rooms, at the top it is called henaepu as a bed and the bottom is called agarowa as a place to rest, tell stories or chat, and eat. The upper part of the attic or floor is made of fruit wood and covered with woven lokop wood (a kind of very small bamboo) and can be covered again with straw or dry grass. There is usually only one door in the honai, which is small and short so that people come out and enter on all fours. To the left or right of the entrance is a door leading to the attic.

=== Traditional weapons and armors ===
Weapons and armors from these section is from Dani people of Kurulu District of Jayawijaya.

The Papuan spear is referred to by the local community as "Tul". The spear was a weapon that could be used for both fighting and hunting. In addition, Papuan culture often uses the spear as a property in dances. The material used to construct the spears are from Papuan ironwood called Kayu Yoli or blackwood called Kayu Yomalo, river stone that was sharpened as a spearhead or instead used to sharpen the tip. For that reason, the spear is able to survive as a weapon that must be present in hunting and fighting activities. What makes this traditional Papuan weapon feel special is that there is a rule not to use a spear other than for hunting and fighting purposes. For example, it is forbidden to cut young tree shoots with a spear, or to use a spear to carry garden produce. If this rule was broken, the person who wielded this spear would have bad luck. Meanwhile, in the manufacturing process, this spear frame takes a long time. Starting from the wood taken from the tree, then cut to the size of 3 m and dried in the sun. After drying it in the sun, the wood for the handle is shaped in such a way, then rubbed with sea snail powder until it is sharp, which takes about 1 week. In traditional Papuan customs, the spear is interpreted as a symbol of a man's prowess. Therefore, the spears must always be properly stored. Usually hung from the ceiling or placed on a house wall support.

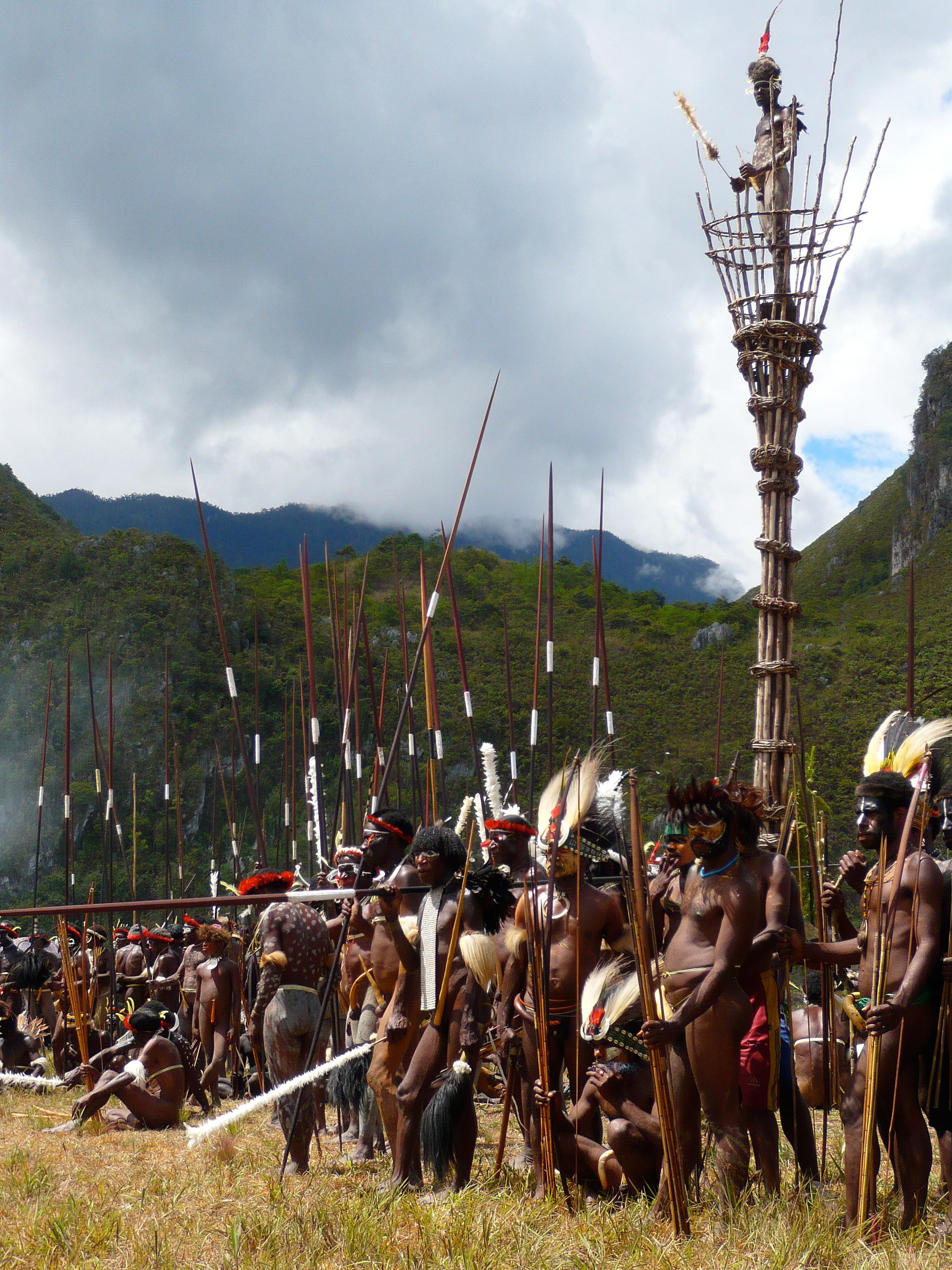
Dani people getting ready for mock battle in Baliem Valley Festival, traditional watchtower (kayo) on the right

The bow and arrow is a traditional Papuan weapon that is used for hunting wild boar and other animals. In addition, the Papuan bow and arrow were tools that were always carried side by side with the spear. Arrows used for war are called Suap, meanwhile arrows used for hunting birds are called Wam Wakiwy with the difference on the arrowheads. If the aim is to hunt birds, then the arrowheads used are made of Kayu Yomalo and Kayu Dion and made three-pronged with two serrated tips and one not serrated tip, to hunt pigs a bamboo tip is used instead. Meanwhile, when going to war, the indigenous tribes in Papua have rules that require that the spearhead used is made of animal bones or hardwood, meanwhile the shaft is made from Pohon Atar. In addition, arrows also function as property and souvenirs for home decoration in several areas in Papua, including Jayapura, Wamena, and Kurulu. In these areas, arrows are only intended for house collections. The collection of bows and arrows is also not allowed to be placed carelessly, that is, they are placed on the wall of the house to still respect the culture of the services of the arrow.

Papuan Stone Axes are called Jee Jugum usually made from river stones with the colour of green, dark blue, and black. The stones were then split in half, marked according to the design and grinded with another stone. Water is prepared beforehand to cool the stones from getting to hot. They were used for households needs, chop woods, and kill enemies in battlefields. In Kurulu, the axe has symbolic meaning during construction of Itonay houses.

Papuan Chisels are traditional Papuan weapons that have various uses, such as cutting rattan for weaving, tools for punching holes in wood, as well as emergency tools for stabbing enemies in the event of war. However, most of their functions have now shifted to tools used in the carpentry field. Historically, in ancient times a chisel was a tool used to trim the fingers during mourning of a dead family member. Unfortunately, this culture has been strongly discouraged and sometimes banned by the government and can only be used as a tool in industry. The chisel-making process is not complicated but can take up to two weeks to make. The handle will have Kele Makwy coiled wrappings made from wood fibers and secured using hidden pegs made from ironwood or cassowary bones.

Papuan knife blades are usually used for slashing or cutting when hunting animals in the forest. Even though the animals they face are large mammals and crocodiles, the Papuan people still adhere to prevailing customs. The custom is that it is not permissible to use any kind of firearm when hunting. Papuan Daggers are knives made of bones of the cassowary or pigs, 15–20 cm long. It was then sharpened using stone and shaped like a dagger. they were used for ceremonial purposes and to cut vegetables or meat during cooking.

The Papuan parang called by the name "jalowy". In the manufacturing process, this Papuan machete takes a lot of time. Derived from a split stone, then sharpened and shaped to form a machete that has an edge. To increase the level of hardness and durability, machete craftsmen add pork oil and pork blood before sharpening it multiple times until it is smooth and sharp. Papuan parangs basically has many uses. For household purposes, namely cooking, cutting meat, and cutting down sago. In addition, Papuan machetes are also used in the agricultural industry, and for dowry during weddings but only the ones made from heirloom stones. Furthermore, parang can also be used as home decoration and collection.

Papuan armors consists of shields called Wali Moken and worn body armors called Walimo. Wali Moken is made from sea shells and wood barks, it is usually hanged on the neck to protect the torso. Sea shells are arranged in a row and tied at the ends using wood barks or rattans. Usually it takes a month to made one piece of armor. Walimo is made from rattan and wood barks. The rattans were cleaned and shaped till they have rounded cross-section, then woven like forming a basket and shaped to be worn like a shirt. Their function is to protect the body from arrows from piercing the body, other uses include worn for ceremonial purposes and as part of traditional dance attire.

=== Music and handicrafts ===
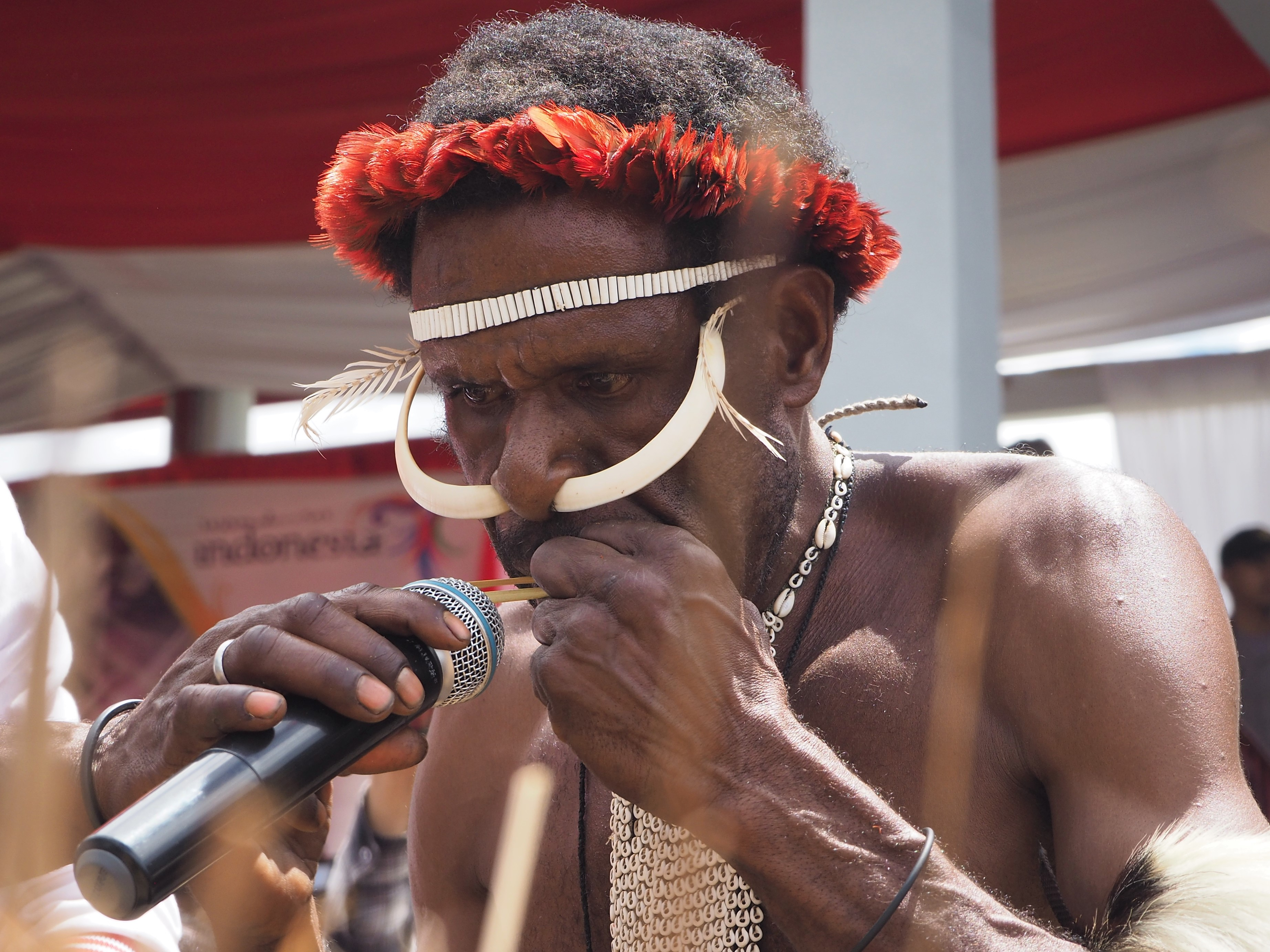
Pikon being played

Pikon is a traditional wind instrument typical of the highland tribes such as Hubula, more commonly called Dani, inhabiting the Baliem Valley. Pikon comes from the word Pikonane in the Dani language, which means a sound musical instrument. While Walak people called it Goknggaik and Lani people called it Longger. Pikon consists of vibrating sticks which are attached with a rope in the middle, so that it is able to produce a variety of sounds. Originally the sticks are made of wood or bamboo but iron have been used to produce higher pitch sound. This musical instrument is generally played by men in the Dani tribe. They play pikon as a fatigue reliever, even though the resulting sound tends not to be melodious because it is just like the sound of birds chirping without tone. However, with the development of the times, now the sounds made by Pikon can be heard as do, mi and sol tones. Pikon is also played in the Jayawijaya Baliem Valley Cultural Festival commemorating Indonesia's Independence Day. The length of the pikon in general is 5.2 cm. The way to play pikon is to blow the center of the stick that has been given a hole while pulling the rope that joins the sticks. Pikon can also be formed using a hite, which is the bark of an arrow.

The Noken is a traditional Papuan bag carried with the head and made of bark fibers, although it is also used as head and body covering. Similar to bags, in general, this bag is used to carry daily necessities. Papuan people usually use it to bring agricultural products such as vegetables, tubers and also to bring merchandise to the market. Because of its uniqueness that is carried with its head, this noken is registered with UNESCO as one of the traditional works and world cultural heritage. On 4 December 2012, the noken was listed in the UNESCO Intangible Cultural Heritage Lists as a cultural heritage of Indonesia. In several regencies of Central Papua and Highland Papua, noken – instead of the usual ballot box – is preferred as a way to place ballots, where the it is recognized as a ballot tool in the Papua regional leadership elections.

The koteka is a penis sheath traditionally worn by native male inhabitants of some (mainly highland) ethnic groups in New Guinea to cover their genitals. They are normally made from a dried-out gourd, Lagenaria siceraria, although unrelated species such as pitcher-plant Nepenthes mirabilis, are also used. They are held in place by a small loop of fiber attached to the base of the koteka and placed around the scrotum. A secondary loop placed around the chest or abdomen is attached to the main body of the koteka. It is traditional clothing in certain New Guinea highlands societies including in the Grand Baliem Valley. It is usually worn without other clothing, tied in upward position, although Yali people wore them with body coils made of rattan. Many tribes can be identified by the way they wear their koteka. Some wear them pointed straight out, straight up, at an angle, or in other directions, which in Lani culture signify the social status of the wearer. The diameter of the koteka can also be a clue. Lani people used a large-diameter koteka called kobewak, which is also used to keep small change and other items, while Yali people used a longer and thinner koteka. Contrary to popular belief, there is little correlation between the size or length of the koteka and the social status of the wearer. In 1971–1972 the Indonesian New Order government launched "Operasi Koteka" ("Operation Penis Gourd") which consisted primarily of trying to encourage the people to wear shorts and shirts because such clothes were considered more "modern". But the people did not have changes of clothing, did not have soap, and were unfamiliar with the care of such clothes so the unwashed clothing caused skin diseases. There were also reports of men wearing the shorts as hats and the women using the dresses as carrying bags. Nevertheless, regular usage have been decreasing. As of 2019, it is estimated that only 10% highland population (in Central Papua and Highland Papua) regularly uses koteka, and it is only worn during cultural festival or as a souvenir.

=== Cuisine ===
The traditional food of Papuan from the Central Highland, usually consists of roasted boar with Tubers such as sweet potato (hipere) as the staple food. This is unlike the staple foods in the lowlands of Western New Guinea and eastern Indonesia in general with sago, or western Indonesian cuisines that favour rice as their staple food. In Highland Papua, pig roast which consists of pork and yams are roasted in heated stones placed in a hole dug in the ground and covered with leaves; this cooking method is called bakar batu (burning the stone), and it is an important cultural and social event among Papuan people. In some Papuan communities who are Muslim or when welcoming Muslim guests, pork can be replaced with chicken or beef or mutton or can be cooked separately with pork. This is, for example, practiced by the Welesi and Meteo communities in Jayawijaya Regency to welcome the holy month of Ramadan.

Udang selingkuh (Cherax sp.) is a type of crawfish dish native to Wamena and the surrounding area. Udang selingkuh is usually served grilled with minimal seasoning, which is only salt. The slightly sweet natural taste of this animal makes it quite salty. The serving of Udang selingkuh is usually accompanied by warm rice and papaya or kale. It is usually also served with the colo-colo sambal combination which has a spicy-sweet taste.

== Transportation ==
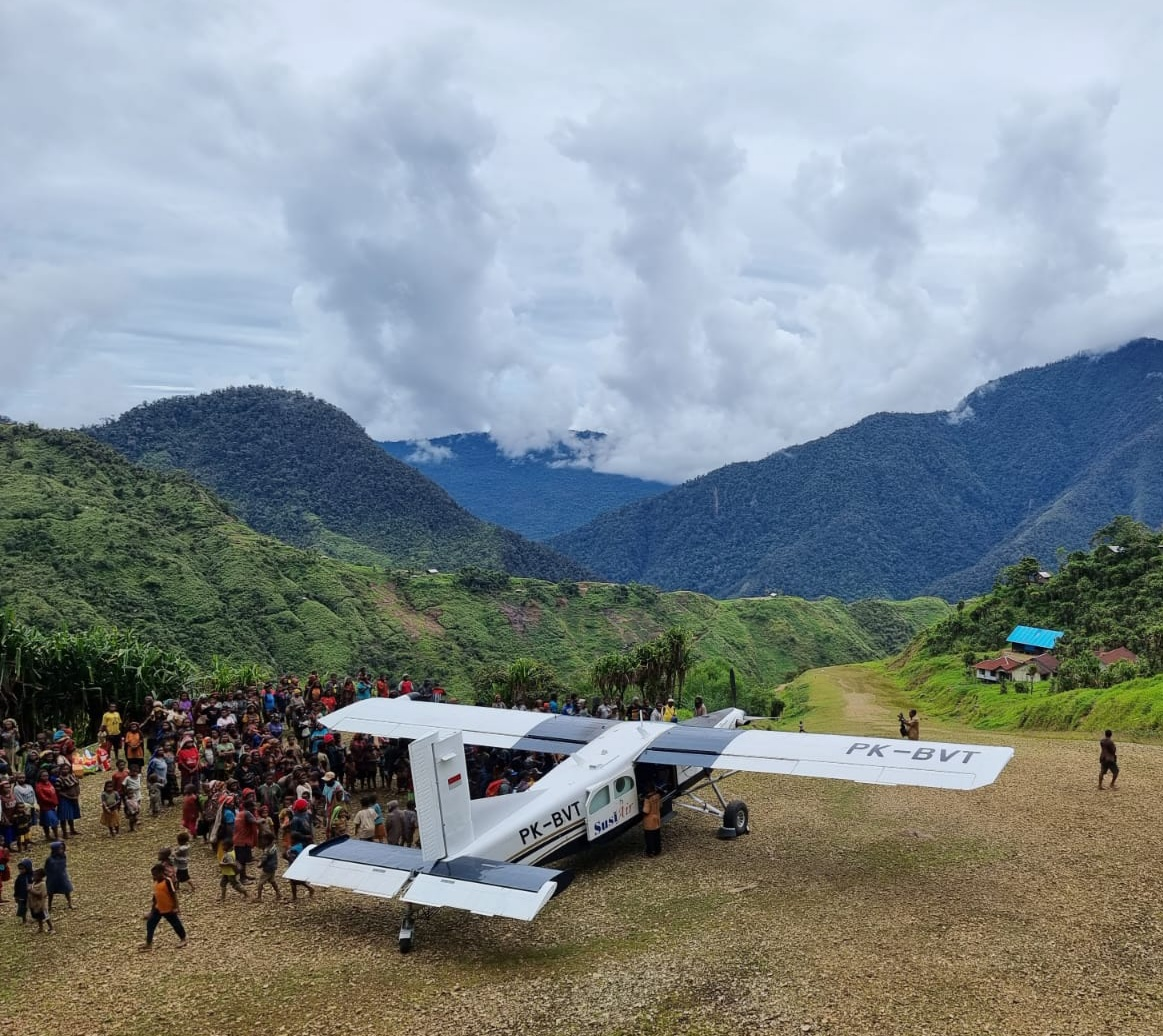
A Susi Air plane on an isolated airfield of Highland Papua

Extensive mountainous terrain and underdeveloped infrastructure highlight the crucial role of air transportation in Highland Papua. Each regency capital has its own airport:

- Wamena Airport in Jayawijaya Regency, the most developed airport in Highland Papua
- Nop Goliat Dekai Airport in Yahukimo Regency
- Oksibil Airport in Pegunungan Bintang Regency
- Tiom Airport in Lanny Jaya Regency
- Karubaga Airport in Tolikara Regency
  - Elelim Airport in Tolikara Regency
- Kobakma Airport in Central Mamberamo Regency
- Kenyam Airport in Nduga Regency

In addition, numerous airfields cater to isolated districts and villages with limited infrastructure, and some airstrips are not paved. These airfields are supported by pioneering routes (rute perintis) subsidized by the government to increase mobility in Highland Papua. Rute perintis airports have limited police and military presence, which can create high risk for pilots and passengers. One notable incident took place in 2023 during the Nduga hostage crisis, when the secessionist Free Papua Movement attacked a plane and took its pilot and all five passengers hostage in the Paro district of Nduga.

== See also ==
- Papua
- Central Papua
- South Papua
- West Papua
- Southwest Papua
