= Yahukimo Regency =

Regency in Highland Papua, Indonesia

Yahukimo Regency Kabupaten Yahukimo
- Regency
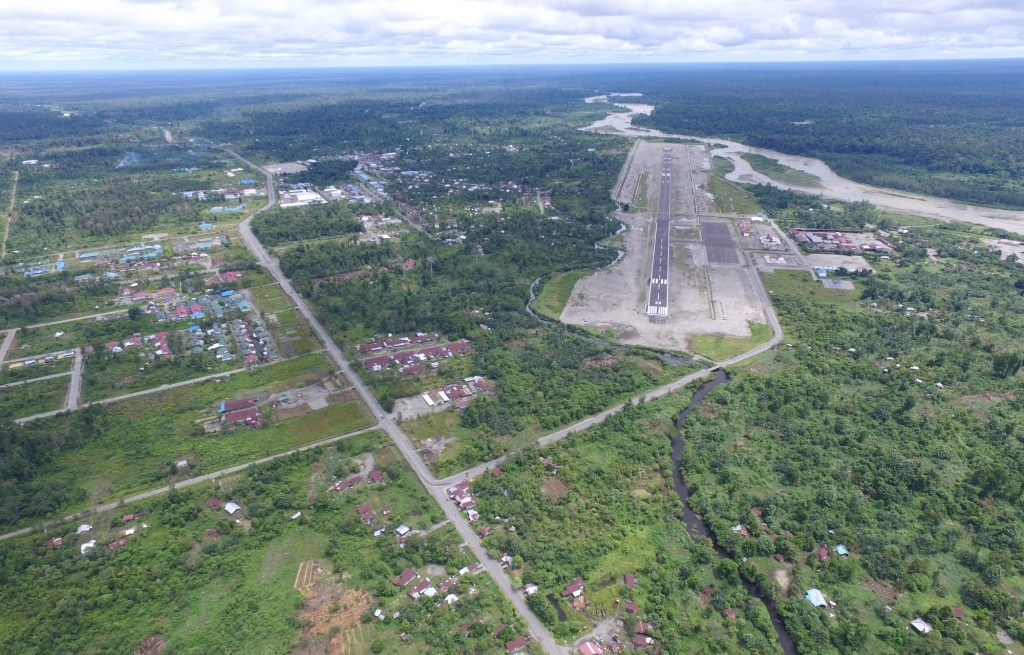
- Dekai, the capital of Yahukimo and its airport

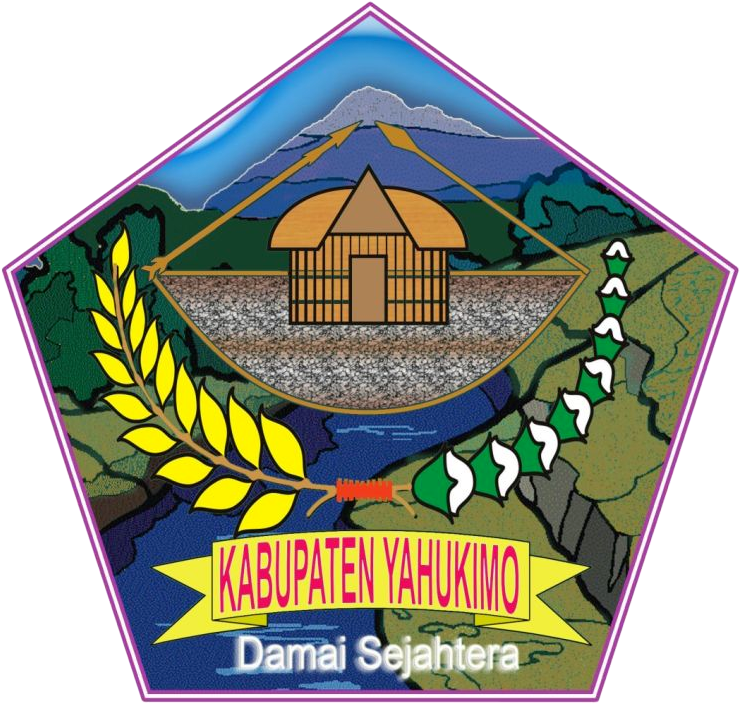
- Seal
- Motto: Damai Sejahtera (Peace [and] Prosper)

- Location in Indonesian Papua Location in Indonesia
- Coordinates: 4.4667°S 139.5833°E
- Country: Indonesia
- Province: Highland Papua
- Capital: Dekai

Government
  - Regent: Didimus Yahuli
  - Vice Regent: Esau Miram

Area
  - Total: 17,152 km^{2} (6,622 sq mi)

Population (mid 2025 estimate)
  - Total: 356,899
  - Density: 20.808/km^{2} (53.893/sq mi)
- Time zone: UTC+9 (Indonesia Eastern Time)
- Area code: (+62) 969
- Website: www.yahukimokab.go.id

Yahukimo Regency is one of the regencies (kabupaten) in the Indonesian province of Highland Papua. It covers an area of 17,152 km^{2}, and had a population of 164,512 at the 2010 Census, but this figure more than doubled to reach 350,880 at the 2020 Census; the official estimate as of mid-2025 was 356,899 (comprising 193,466 males and 163,433 females). The official administrative centre of Yahukimo Regency is at Sumohai, which is located 25 kilometres north of the town of Dekai, but - due to the lack of infrastructure in Sumohai - the actual administrative centre of the regency is in Dekai. The regency was formerly part of the Jayawijaya Regency, but was split off to become a separate regency on 11 December 2002.

== Etymology ==
The name Yahukimo is a combined word from the names of the tribes living in the area, the Yali, Hubla, Kimyal and Momuna.

== Geography ==
Yahukimo Regency is located in Highland Papua Province, Indonesia. Its geography consists mostly of mountainous areas and highlands. The regency has mountainous terrain and dense forests, with altitudes varying from lowlands to high mountains. This hilly topography makes access to some areas difficult and isolated. In addition, Yahukimo is also crossed by several rivers and has a high diversity of flora and fauna. The climate in this area is generally tropical with quite high rainfall throughout the year.

== Demography ==
Yahukimo Regency has a diverse population with several indigenous Papuan ethnic groups dominating the region. The tribes found in Yahukimo Regency are Yali, Hupla, Kimyal, Momuna, Una-Ukam, Mek, Yalimek, Ngalik, Tokuni, Obini, Karowai, Duwe, Obukain, Kopkaka and Bese. Local Papuan languages are often used in everyday life, in addition to Indonesian.

The population density in Yahukimo is relatively low compared to other areas in Papua, largely due to the difficult terrain and underdeveloped infrastructure. Most people live in small settlements scattered throughout the area. The economy in Yahukimo is largely based on subsistence agriculture, with some people also involved in hunting and forest gathering.

Overall, Yahukimo's demographics reflect the diversity of local Papuan cultures and traditions, with challenges related to developing basic infrastructure and services in a remote and difficult-to-access area.

Incident

On December 9, 2005, it was reported that around 55 residents of Krapon District died of starvation due to being late in planting tubers (hipere) which are a food source in the area. The area is remote and can only be reached by plane.

== Administrative districts ==
The existing Yahukimo regency comprises fifty-one districts (distrik), tabulated below with their areas and their populations at the 2010 Census and the 2020 Census, together with the official estimates as of mid-2025. The regency has a greater number of districts within it than any other regency in Indonesia; however, proposals are currently under consideration by the Indonesian government to divide Yahukimo Regency into several new regencies. The table also includes the locations of the district administrative centres, the number of administrative villages in each district (totaling 510 rural kampung and 1 urban kelurahan - the town of Obolma), and its postal code.

Kode Wilayah	Name of District (distrik)	Area in km^{2}	Pop'n 2010 Census	Pop'n 2020 Census	Pop'n mid 2025 Estimate	Admin centre	No. of villages	Post code
95.03.01	Kurima	605	6,622	16,188	16,486	Obolma	23	99705
95.03.12	Musaik	452	3,351	6,733	6,837	Usaregeik	10	99707
95.03.07	Dekai	520	6,844	17,316	17,661	Dekai	12	99702
95.03.08	Obio	470	4,177	6,194	6,214	Obio	13	99708
95.03.13	Pasema	320	1,692	5,810	5,332	Pasema	7	99709
95.03.11	Amuma	376	4,280	13,931	13,431	Amuma	13	99701
95.03.09	Suru Suru	431	3,363	7,040	4,198	Gofa	7	99715
95.03.10	Wusama	360	4,315	7,870	7,368	Apdagma	11	99719
95.03.04	Silimo	536	5,663	13,795	14,006	Silimo	20	99712
95.03.03	Ninia	390	4,093	6,973	7,267	Ninia	10	99740
95.03.34	Huluwon	190	3,408	5,424	5,414	Holuwon	7	99733
95.03.35	Lolat	341	3,800	6,228	6,764	Wanim	8	99739
95.03.39	Langda	341	2,308	7,031	7,154	Langda	9	99738
95.03.40	Bomela	350	1,466	5,005	5,750	Bomela	6	99731
95.03.41	Suntamon	331	1,309	4,487	4,526	Suntamon	8	99744
95.03.43	Sobaham	331	3,410	7,443	7,329	Yalisomon	13	99742
95.03.38	Korupun	230	4,838	9,819	10,540	Koropun	12	99735
95.03.37	Sela	354	4,969	11,368	13,505	Sela	16	99741
95.03.45	Kwelemdua	331	2,736	6,601	7,825	Debula	10	99736
95.03.02	Anggruk	440	1,649	5,183	5,252	Yaholikma	12	99751
95.03.20	Panggema	530	3,126	7,647	7,016	Pontenikma	13	99759
95.03.25	Walma	341	1,792	4,720	4,372	Walma	8	99765
95.03.21	Kosarek	350	3,988	6,288	6,582	Kosarek	11	99756
95.03.23	Ubahak	432	7,310	12,005	12,200	Ubahak	17	99763
95.03.06	Nalca	225	3,534	7,475	7,262	Nalca	8	99757
95.03.30	Puldama	272	1,928	6,196	5,938	Puldama	8	99761
95.03.22	Nipsan	341	2,887	3,538	3,787	Nipsan	8	99758
95.03.05	Samenage	361	2,044	5,946	6,119	Samenage	9	99710
95.03.18	Tangma	340	4,239	5,144	5,669	Tangma	10	99716
95.03.16	Soba	162	1,129	4,485	4,725	Soba	6	99713
95.03.15	Mugi	311	4,489	7,812	7,886	Kosihun	20	99706
95.03.49	Yogosem	150	1,004	5,020	4,284	Yogosem	7	99720
95.03.50	Kayo	198	1,405	4,767	4,471	Kayo	7	99704
95.03.51	Sumo	350	3,419	5,953	6,705	Sumo	11	99714
95.03.14	Hogio	374	3,201	6,858	6,436	Paima	8	99703
95.03.19	Ukha	360	4,276	6,528	5,917	Ukha	10	99717
95.03.17	Werima	360	4,037	7,265	7,432	Werima	14	99718
95.03.36	Soloikma	344	3,146	5,953	6,451	Weawen	8	99743
95.03.42	Seradala	340	4,182	4,373	5,082	Seradala	9	99711
95.03.44	Kabianggama	329	2,453	5,436	5,536	Kabianggama	7	99734
95.03.46	Kwikma	351	2,304	5,177	5,728	Silakma	10	99737
05.03.47	Hilipuk	180	4,490	6,387	7,262	Hilipuk	7	99732
95.03.26	Yahuliambut	340	1,035	5,348	4,946	Sabundalek	5	99745
95.03.27	Hereapini	361	2,995	6,674	7,103	Hereapini	11	99755
95.03.28	Ubalihi	340	1,422	6,618	7,664	Wanam	11	99764
95.03.29	Talambo	342	2,262	4,739	3,769	Lelambo	9	99762
95.03.24	Pronggoli	330	2,359	6,591	6,452	Siwikma	8	99760
95.03.31	Endomen	343	2,458	5,203	5,463	Endomen	8	99754
95.03.32	Kona	126	2,266	2,637	3,067	Kona	5	99721
95.03.48	Duram	100	3,225	4,816	5,279	Duram	6	99753
95.03.33	Dirwemna	170	1,814	2,842	3,437	Dirwemna	5	99752
	Totals	17,152	164,512	350,880	356,899	Dekai	511	
