= List of districts of Highland Papua =

The province of Highland Papua (Provinsi Papua Pegunungan) in Indonesia is divided into eight kabupaten (regencies) which in turn are divided administratively into districts, known as distrik under the law of 2001 on "special autonomy for Papua province".

== List ==
The districts of Highland Papua and their respective regencies are as follows (as of July 2022). Administrative villages (desa in rural areas and keluhuran in urban areas) are also listed for each district.

Regency	District	Languages in district	Administrative villages
Jayawijaya	Asologaima (Asalogaima)		Araboda, Kimbin (Kimbim), Kombagwe, Logotpaga, Loki, Miligatnem, Tikawo, Walak, Wanggonoma, Wawanca
Jayawijaya	Asolokobal		Asolokobal, Asotapo, Helaluwa, Hesatom, Mulinekama, Ninabua, Sinata, Wiaima, Yapema
Jayawijaya	Asotipo		Air Garam, Asotipo, Heberima, Hitigima, Hukulimo, Iwigima, Kuantapo, Pobiatma, Putageima (Putagaima), Sogokmo (Sogomo)
Jayawijaya	Bolakme		Bandua, Bimu, Bolakme, Kugitero, Lani Timur, Munak, Nunggarugum, Owagambak, Poitmos, Tekani, Tononggame (Tenonggame), Wenamela
Jayawijaya	Bpiri		Ayoma, Dlinggama, Dlonggoki, Irilinga / Irilingga (Irilingan), Onggaba (Onggabaga / Onggobaga), Tirunggu, Walakma
Jayawijaya	Bugi		Air Garam, Bugi, Dewene, Kodlangga, Manda, Tagulik, Totni, Walak Selatan
Jayawijaya	Hubikiak		Dokopku, Hituma (Hetuma), Hom-hom, Hubukiak / Hubikiak, Husoak, Likino, Musiamia, Musiamia Dua
Jayawijaya	Hubikosi (Hobikosi)		Hubikosi, Ikilumo, Isakusa, Jibilabaga, Kikhumo, Kosihilapok, Kosimeage (Kosimeaga), Meagama, Pelima, Pipukmo, Sunili
Jayawijaya	Ibele		Ayobaibur (Ayubaibur), Habema, Holaliba, Ibele, Tipalok, Yagarobak (Yagakobak), Yelebarek, Yokalpalek, Zapma, Zinai
Jayawijaya	Itlay Hisage		Helepalegem, Kemisake, Lukaken, Miami, Siliwa, Sumunikama, Tomisa, Waoba (Wuroba / Waroba), Yogonima
Jayawijaya	Koragi		Koragi, Kumudiluk, Tagibaga, Telegai, Tenondek
Jayawijaya	Kurulu		Abusa, Eragama (Erema), Hopama, Iyantik, Kumima (Kimina), Mebagaima, Mulima, Obya, Umpagalo, Utkolo Satu, Waga Waga, Yiwika (Jiwika)
Jayawijaya	Libarek		Kilubaga, Muliama, Musalfak, Punakul, Wenabubaga
Jayawijaya	Maima		Esiak, Heraewa, Husewa, Kepi, Maima, Menagaima, Minimo
Jayawijaya	Molagalome		Kwigiluk, Mebunukme, Molagalome, Okwa, Tanahmerah, Towagame
Jayawijaya	Muliama		Asologaima, Delekama, Helefa / Halefa, Holkima, Hukuragi, Kewin, Konan, Miliama (Muliama), Molebaga, Pilibaga, Sekom, Silamik
Jayawijaya	Musatfak		Abulukmo, Anegara (Anegera), Elabukama, Hamuhi, Kosihave, Mulupalek, Pumasili, Siapma, Temia, Yumugima
Jayawijaya	Napua		Healekma, Holima, Lani Matuan, Napua, Okilik, Sapalek, Wilekama, Yelekama, Yomaima
Jayawijaya	Pelebaga		Aleak, Duabalek, Filia, Heatnem, Hitelowa, Inanekelok, Isugunik, Landia, Mulukmo, Waukahilapok, Wililimo, Witalak, Yabem
Jayawijaya	Piramid		Aboneri, Algonik, Balima, Beam, Gobalimo, Perabaga, Piramid, Yalinggume, Yonggime, Yumbun
Jayawijaya	Pisugi		Aikima, Akiaput, Pabuma, Pikhe, Pisugi, Suroba, Wara
Jayawijaya	Popugoba		Pupugoba (Popugoba), Waima, Yelelo, Yomote
Jayawijaya	Siepkosi		Isawa Himan, Lunaima, Manika, Noagalo, Sekan, Sekan Dalam, Siepkosi, Wekia, Yumogima (Isibitlah)
Jayawijaya	Silo Karno Doga		Apnae, Elaboga (Elaboge), Gigilobo, Holasili, Olagi, Wogi, Wonenggulik, Yerega
Jayawijaya	Taelarek		Bokiem, Budliem, Entagekokma, Huluaima, Iyora, Senogolik, Tailarek (Taila), Yoman Weya
Jayawijaya	Tagime		Gume Kupari, Lakwame, Lapeyo, Mulugame, Onggobalo, Porome, Tagime, Wandinggunie, Yanggapura, Yogobur, Yordania Tulak
Jayawijaya	Tagineri		Binibaga, Gelelame, Injuta, Melemei, Pagaluk, Taginem (Tagineri), Tamokilo (Tamokilu / Tamokulu), Wilaloma, Wuragukme
Jayawijaya	Trikora		Anggulpa, Dinggilimo, Kora Jaya, Korambirik, Nanggo, Trikora
Jayawijaya	Usilimo		Abutpuk, Alona, Fikha, Gua Wisata, Isaiman, Meagamia, Siba, Undulumo, Usilimo, Wosiala
Jayawijaya	Wadangku		Agulimo, Luku-luku, Musiem, Wadangku, Yomosimo
Jayawijaya	Walaik		Elarek, Holima, Walaik, Welekama, Yelai
Jayawijaya	Walelagama		Itlay Halitopo, Kubulakma, Kulaken, Pugima, Walelagama, Wamusage
Jayawijaya	Wame		Dogoname, Dumapaga, Wame, Yanenggame
Jayawijaya	Wamena		Autakma, Batu Merah, Honaima, Honelama, Honelama Dua, Hulekama / Hurekama, Lanitipo, Sinakma, Sinapuk, Wamaroma, Wamena Kota
Jayawijaya	Welesi		Apenas, Asojelipele, Lantipo, Pawekama, Tulima, Welesi, Yagara
Jayawijaya	Wesaput		Agamoa, Ilokama, Kama, Mawampi, Parema, Silumarek, Wesaganya, Yaloaput
Jayawijaya	Wita Waya		Alolik, Alula, Koma, Tulem, Wiligima
Jayawijaya	Wollo (Wolo)		Alugi, Kukurima, Pirambor (Pirambot), Tegabaga, Wodloma, Wollo Timur, Wolo (Wollo), Wunan
Jayawijaya	Wouma		Ketimavit, Logonoba, Pipitmo, Sinarekowa, Wesakin, Wesakma, Wouma
Jayawijaya	Yalengga		Aipakma, Akorek, Bitti, Manili, Pilimo, Taganik, Tumun, Wamanuk Dua, Wananuk, Wugurima, Yalengga (Yelengga)
Lanny Jaya	Awina		Andiaput, Dolinggame, Eyuni, Indawa, Nambume, Tinggira, Wumuak, Wuragabur, Yugumia
Lanny Jaya	Ayumnati		Anitila, Bogogunik, Luagame, Lubutini, Nanim, Nindonak, Tikome, Tikoyowa, Wanggunom
Lanny Jaya	Balingga		Balime, Balingga, Binolanggen, Dewaka, Gume, Tima, Timonikime, Towewak, Yialo, Yumaneri
Lanny Jaya	Balingga Barat		Anggumabume, Baliempura, Denomagi, Lorea, Magame, Tinggipura, Yeyugu, Yugume
Lanny Jaya	Bruwa		Birik, Bruyugu, Ekaba, Longgapur, Ogodome, Tikuluk, Wame, Wumbugi, Yalogu
Lanny Jaya	Buguk Gona		Dangguni, Dua Lanny, Genena, Ilunggime, Kabiga, Karunggame, Kelonome, Kulogonggame, Melendik, Pirime, Tekul, Timolome, Wunime
Lanny Jaya	Dimba		Dimba, Magegobak, Mewilangun, Nongopnage, Talibarenak, Wawiragi, Wengenambur, Yugwa
Lanny Jaya	Gamelia		Gamelia, Gawiwarak, Gunagewak, Meyagale, Pirawun, Wulaipas, Wunume, Wupi
Lanny Jaya	Gelok Beam		Beam, Gelok, Gondura, Juta, Kulip, Murtani, Pirambor, Tigima, Wanggu
Lanny Jaya	Goa Balim		Balimneri, Dinuwi, Gwilonik, Ilim, Kungganeri, Timotani, Wamitu
Lanny Jaya	Gollo		Golopura, Gubugame, Kamenak, Kulia, Libome, Nengguga, Nileme, Perime, Wadinawi, Wirini, Yamiga
Lanny Jaya	Guna		Gukopi, Guna, Keyagalo, Kori, Nondinime, Piwugun, Wigume
Lanny Jaya	Gupura		Andeyok, Jilam, Kibingga, Kimbo, Lelam, Magelo, Ogobakni, Onesia, Penggima, Teiko, Wapur, Yaneko
Lanny Jaya	Karu		Ayafofa, Delegari, Igimbua, Salemo, Towoluk, Tunume, Yilokdu, Yudani
Lanny Jaya	Kelulome		Ilunggijime, Juyiga, Kelulome, Lewinagi, Muluneri, Peragime, Talogi, Wegenpura, Wiringgame, Wiyagi
Lanny Jaya	Kolawa		Ambena, Gunumbur, Kolayak, Kolunggu, Kondena, Labora, Lalugume, Timotius, Wanuga, Yagarikme
Lanny Jaya	Kuly Lanny		Guburini, Indugu, Jiwikelanny, Kagaluwi, Londu, Nisimok, Piname, Yugume
Lanny Jaya	Kuyawage		Kuyawage, Luarem, Peko, Tumbupur, Tunikele, Uwome, Wupaga, Yugunomba
Lanny Jaya	Lannyna		Bawi, Bonom, Kumulume, Kuwanom, Kuwoge, Lagame, Laurapaga, Ogin, Tinggini, Uwagambur, Yugimbo
Lanny Jaya	Makki		Gembilani, Kemiri, Kotorambur, Mamiri, Nambume, Tengenawi, Waganenga, Yorenime
Lanny Jaya	Melagi		Gilo, Kewagi, Mbu (Mbu Pemekaran), Nombome, Numbokawi, Wabiragi, Wunabunggu, Yigemili
Lanny Jaya	Melagineri		Bagi, Binilani, Ganume, Gumban, Lowanom, Malagai, Nambu, Oka
Lanny Jaya	Milimbo		Jinok, Kidoni, Kugame, Milimbo, Takobak, Umbename, Wamindik, Wewolome
Lanny Jaya	Mokoni		Bigipura, Bumalome, Guninggame, Kondename, Mokoni, Popome, Wakumalo, Wuyumbur, Yanggelome
Lanny Jaya	Muara		Abua, Bogangi, Gikur, Gipura, Golome, Gulu, Kuruguneri, Lualo, Muara, Wiyapur
Lanny Jaya	Nikogwe		Ambime, Elubaga, Kotorambur, Langgime, Pindalo, Wanggagome, Wulawa, Wumbanakme, Yimiribaga
Lanny Jaya	Niname		Dapogi, Dugume, Kulumburu, Molobok, Tugunakwi, Wulundia, Yanuru
Lanny Jaya	Nogi		Berangwi, Kwenukwi, Libungga, Unom, Weneogun, Wimolome, Yirene, Yogobak
Lanny Jaya	Pirime		Amberingime, Aniwo, Bugumbak, Ekanom, Umbanume, Wenam, Yalipak, Yugumbinik
Lanny Jaya	Poga		Bigipaga, Binipaga, Binompaga, Brigme, Guaneri, Kanikbukme, Lugobak, Lugwa, Luneri, Megalunik, Mugime, Poga, Unikme
Lanny Jaya	Tiom		Bokon, Dura, Ginime, Gurika, Kuapur, Langgalo, Olume, Oyi, Palunggame, Wadinalome, Yilondum
Lanny Jaya	Tiom Ollo		Bogomanum, Bonanip, Giari, Kotorambur, Kukepake, Kumuluk, Lambui, Numbo, Pindoak, Wayuleme
Lanny Jaya	Tiomneri		Arigineri, Arungwi, Gubulela, Gumbo, Kolari, Kuwobaga, Milinggame, Muleme, Ponuma
Lanny Jaya	Wano Barat		Andugume, Dugu-dugu, Kobanu, Mingga, Mume, Nabei, Nenggeya, Piragi, Tenawi, Tinime, Wamiru
Lanny Jaya	Wereka		Beyongwi, Dingun, Lura Marah, Pelek, Ponalo, Tabukeker, Timi, Tiwa, Wuragi
Lanny Jaya	Wiringgambut		Giruwi, Golo, Golomi, Kiludo, Milidi, Uniwani, Wiringgambut, Wuluwebur, Yiwili, Yugumobur
Lanny Jaya	Yiginua		Abua, Golikme, Gumagame, Ninabua, Ninengwa, Tepogi, Weri
Lanny Jaya	Yiluk		Ekapame, Jilekme, Kubagalo, Odika, Papani, Wanome, Yiluweneri, Yubumabur
Lanny Jaya	Yugungwi		Bogun Kunik, Gimili Alome, Giwan, Konikme, Lugom, Mabume, Omapaga, Urgelo, Wandoak
Mamberamo Tengah	Eragayam		Arsbol, Ayeki, Engaima, Enggama, Erageam, Kino, Kugab (Kugap), Mogonik, Moligi, Pagale, Wanilok, Winam, Winima, Wurigelobar, Yabendili
Mamberamo Tengah	Ilugwa		Danama, Illusilimo, Ilugwa, Kalarin, Melenggama, Wirima
Mamberamo Tengah	Kelila		Binime, Dibunggen, Dogobak, Gelora, Kambo, Kelila, Kindok, Kumbu, Mabuna, Manggaleso, Onggobalo, Pelanme, Tari, Tikapura, Timeria, Tonggrik, Uganda, Yagabur, Yalenggolo
Mamberamo Tengah	Kobagma (Kobakma)		Aunduang (Anduang), Baliklabuk, Boroges, Dogle (Dokle), Gimbis, Guawage, Keniwa, Kobagma (Kobakma), Luarima, Moga, Ninugagas, Sembegulik, Seralema, Wiyugobak, Yagalim
Mamberamo Tengah	Megambilis		Higisyam, Homasan, Megambilis, Tariko
Nduga	Alama		Alama, Gin, Kulesa, Nolit
Nduga	Dal		Dal, Grinbun, Gurumbe, Kaboneri, Silan, Silankuru
Nduga	Embetpen		Bisikimu, Digilimu, Embetpem, Wendama, Yenai
Nduga	Gearek		Bomegi, Gearek, Gebem, Gilingga, Kibid, Tribit (Tribid), Weneworarosa
Nduga	Geselma (Geselema)		Geselma (Geselema), Kosolpem, Talem
Nduga	Inikgal		Abualak, Area, Biripem, Dakbri, Gulama, Kigam, Urugom, Wumaga
Nduga	Iniye		Baklema, Embuklem, Iniye, Kibendumu, Kosobak, Simiye
Nduga	Kegayem		Bambi, Gilpid, Ininkwaning, Kagayem, Kumbuklema, Kumbun, Kusit, Narugu, Osama, Peya-Peya, Sanwaruk, Sigimbut, Wipdumu
Nduga	Kenyam		Bombam, Delpel, Dim, Kemali, Kenyam, Sralala, Ulunmu, Yike, Yunat
Nduga	Kilmid		Gemam, Kilmid, Puruwa, Yutpul
Nduga	Kora		Brutnai, Kora, Nanggoal, Wenam, Wilimi
Nduga	Koroptak		Gol (Go), Golparek, Komoroam, Kroptak (Koroptak), Miniem, Pesat
Nduga	Krepkuri		Alguru, Banggabeak, Ginid, Krepkuri, Mumugu, Sagapusatu
Nduga	Mam		Darakma, Dendamba, Kibiaren, Kibo, Lakda, Laruid, Mam, Paruarem, Pukle, Putdumu, Wanduama, Wolmbam, Yebandui, Yibi
Nduga	Mapenduma		Duma, Dumdum, Endumu, Kelapa Dua, Litkui, Lunggadumu, Mapenduma, Nowomlusu, Palsam, Yoe
Nduga	Mbua Tengah		Paris, Pirim-Pirim, Rapa, Simie, Sokore, Tobonggom, Tombisik, Urugi, Yepma
Nduga	Mbulmu Yalma		Brambel, Kabolilangen, Kibisim, Klabypma (Kiabypma), Kolma, Labrik, Uburu
Nduga	Mbuwa (Mbua / Mbuga)		Arugia, Digilimu, Kogomaru, Mbua (Mbuwa), Opmu, Otalama
Nduga	Mebarok		Aptam, Bone, Eregenmanggal, Lemurak, Meborok, Narugum, Ngenamba, Olunmu, Pereki, Sabiem, Setmit, Siginimarem, Talpam, Yuguru
Nduga	Moba		Anggulpa, Gunea (Gunia), Kwegono, Langpang, Moba, Moba Dua, Pijama, Yeretma
Nduga	Mugi		Delit, Dobopem, Dondoklema, Gisarok, Isiklak, Kemamburu, Keret Anggoma, Manet, Miri, Mirikil, Mugi, Paru, Sambua, Sarit, Unue, Womsit, Wundui, Yelsengge
Nduga	Nenggeagin		Kombama, Neggea, Nenggeagin, Wenggenambut, Wulagumi
Nduga	Nirkuri		Binime, Kokujondumu, Kurigi, Likubuk, Nirigimbirik, Nirkuri, Oldobo, Pasebem, Sigmie, Uenoma
Nduga	Paro		Animarem, Loaraba, Lombrik, Paro, Tawelma
Nduga	Pasir Putih		Benggem, Mandala, Pasir Putih, Trim
Nduga	Pija		Murupbaye, Nganai, Pija, Siat, Sitgama
Nduga	Wosak		Bambisik, Biala, Ndugwa (Ndukwa), Pilini, Sitpogol
Nduga	Wusi		Gimigip, Ginigit, Pijemae, Wusi
Nduga	Wutpaga		Luaren, Muli, Tinigele, Wangun, Wuone, Wutpaga
Nduga	Yal		Betbere, Biledumu, Dangenpem, Dengpa, Diringgama, Gimi, Girimnak, Gularem, Lambule, Mugiarem, Muruldumu, Palpam, Samba, Sitdobo, Suelama, Sujomdobo, Undo, Yaba, Yal, Yimogi
Nduga	Yenggelo		Maima, Nolo, Wuarem, Yenggelo
Nduga	Yigi		Borot, Delsa, Disendobo, Ekilapok (Ekilapo), Karunggame, Lumbukdumu, Sirit, Sumbo, Suwenem, Wiritlak, Yebadolma, Yigi
Pegunungan Bintang	Aboy		Aboy, Armise, Jubly, Luban, Lulis Wii, Pipal, Woro
Pegunungan Bintang	Alemsom		Alemsom, Bakwalin Yub, Binalkom, Bondik, Eraduman, Imiryi, Muruman, Payol Masumkon, Sumtamon, Tapasik, Tapob, Tibal
Pegunungan Bintang	Awinbon		Awinbon, Kawe, Mikir, Nanum Anaip, Yelobib
Pegunungan Bintang	Batani		Bakata, Batani, Karye / Kariye, Palur Dua, Palur Satu, Segame, Sople
Pegunungan Bintang	Batom		Abukerom, Akyako, Batom, Batom Dua, Belomo, Mongham (Mogham), Muara, Neep, Oksip, Peteng, Sabi
Pegunungan Bintang	Bime		Bime, Bob, Bunggon, Calab, Kameme, Lim Lim, Limiri, Perem, Teli, Turwe
Pegunungan Bintang	Borme		Arina, Aringgon, Bordamban, Borme, Bukam, Cangdamban, Kolgir, Kwime, Laydamban, Omban, Onya, Seban, Sikibur
Pegunungan Bintang	Eipumek	Eipomek	Barama, Basiringe, Bunyirye, Eipumek / Elpomek (Elpuna), Kweredala, Lalakon, Londinin, Malingdam, Mungkona, Serabum, Supleyu, Talemu, Tanime, Wakidam
Pegunungan Bintang	Iwur (Okiwur)		Dinmot Arim, Dipol, Ewenkatop, Iwur, Kamyoim, Kurukim (Kurumkim / Kurumklin), Narnger, Nenginum, Ulkubi, Walapkubun
Pegunungan Bintang	Jetfa	Yetfa	Bris, Jetfa, Kalimbu, Lulis, Tupalma Dua, Tupalma Satu
Pegunungan Bintang	Kalomdol		Arinkop, Dabolding, Imik, Kalomdol (Kalondoi), Tulo
Pegunungan Bintang	Kawor		Arintap, Ater, Kawor, Nanum, Sakup, Tarngop, Umding
Pegunungan Bintang	Kiwirok		Asua, Berusaha, Delpem, Diip, Kiwi, Kukihil, Lolim, Mangoldoki, Oknanggul, Pelebib, Pomding, Sopamikma
Pegunungan Bintang	Kiwirok Timur		Dikdon, Ehiptem (Ehipten / Ohiptem), Oketur, Okhik (Oklip), Okyako, Okyaop, Okyop (Okyob / Okyaop), Tatam, Wantem (Wanten)
Pegunungan Bintang	Mofinop	Murkim	Milki, Mot / Moot, Muara Asbi, Tual, Yubu
Pegunungan Bintang	Murkim	Murkim	Bias, Bumi, Delemo, Tero
Pegunungan Bintang	Nongme		Cangpally, Kwarban, Nongme, Omtamur, Rubol, Yarigon, Yokom
Pegunungan Bintang	Ok Aom		Aplim, Bulangkop, Kungulding, Limarum, Okdo, Yumakot
Pegunungan Bintang	Okbab		Atembabol, Borban, Dumpasi, Kirimu, Maksum, Markom, Omliom, Pedam, Peneli, Sabin, Tupoplyom, Yapil
Pegunungan Bintang	Okbape		Akmer, Bape, Ibot, Kasawi, Masim, Tapasik Dua Bapenka (Tapasik Dua)
Pegunungan Bintang	Okbemtau		Atang Doki, Bemhimiku, Bilip Bayo, Kaep, Okalut Kumal, Okbem, Okngam, Oktaru, Oktau
Pegunungan Bintang	Okbibab		Abmisibil (Apmisibil), Atoldol (Atolbol), Iriding, Manunggal (Okipur), Okaplo, Okbifisil (Okbifisis), Oksemar, Oktanglap
Pegunungan Bintang	Okhika		Kotyobakon, Okelwel, Okteneng, Tengnong
Pegunungan Bintang	Oklip		Komok, Okamin, Okbumul, Okhim, Oklip, Oktem, Oktumi
Pegunungan Bintang	Oksamol		Autpahik, Bomding, Honkuding, Okdilam, Okdunam, Okhaka, Okma, Okpa, Oktae, Paune, Tinibil, Tomka
Pegunungan Bintang	Oksebang		Kubiphkop (Kubibkop), Mangabip, Okano, Sebul
Pegunungan Bintang	Oksibil		Akmakot, Aldom, Bunamdol, Kabiding (Betaabib), Kutdol, Mabilabol, Molbib Silibib, Polsam
Pegunungan Bintang	Oksop		Alutbakon, Atenor / Atenar, Mimin, Oksop, Oktumi
Pegunungan Bintang	Pamek		Baramirye, Barice, Imde, Kalek, Lumdakna, Mandalak, Marikla, Pamek, Pinggon, Yabosorom, Yokul
Pegunungan Bintang	Pepera		Bon Yakwol, Denom, Ok Telabe (Ok Telab), Okbon, Pepera, Wok Bakon, Yun Muku
Pegunungan Bintang	Serambakon		Modusit, Okatem, Parim, Seramkatop, Siminbuk, Wanbakon, Yakmor, Yapimakot
Pegunungan Bintang	Tarup		Beten Dua, Bitipding, Imsin, Marang Tiking, Omor, Onkor, Tarup
Pegunungan Bintang	Teiraplu		Bautme, Maigame, Murme, Sinami / Sinani (Yuaban), Teiraplu, Terapdei, Teriame, Yitarget, Yuaban Dua, Yuaban Satu
Pegunungan Bintang	Weime		Daluban, Limrepasikne, Mekdamgon, Merpasikne, Meryang, Nomteren, Taramlu, Weime, Youlban (Yolban)
Tolikara	Airgaram		Kubur, Lenggup, Liwese, Onggokme, Tabo Wanimbo, Tinger, Wenduri, Weu
Tolikara	Anawi		Anawi, Aridunda, Bieleme, Gineri, Imurik, Kotori, Linggira, Loguk, Yalipura, Yalokobak
Tolikara	Aweku		Agin, Kogagi, Kolanggun, Posman, Tiyonggi, Wamigi, Wenggun, Wuluk, Yebena, Yelly
Tolikara	Bewani		Abena, Arelam, Bilubaga, Bitillabur, Duma, Gabunggobak, Gelalo, Nogobumbu, Wanggulam, Wania, Windik, Wulurik, Yibalo, Yinama
Tolikara	Biuk		Biuk, Galubup, Guburini, Mbinime / Jinulira, Purugi, Tomagi / Gubagi, Tomagipura, Wonabu, Yiluk / Kondenggun, Yiyogobak / Kibur, Yugu Mabur
Tolikara	Bogonuk		Aliduda, Andomak, Bogonuk, Ewan, Laura, Paba, Talinamber, Walelo, Wisman, Wumelak
Tolikara	Bokondini		Apiam, Bokondini, Dunduma, Galala, Jawalane, Kologume, Lambogo, Mairini, Mingganggo, Tenggagama, Umaga
Tolikara	Bokoneri		Abimbak, Bokoneri, Bolly, Donggem, Durima, Kanere, Kanewunuk, Kurewunuk, Lerewere, Munagame, Nanggurilime, Nunggalo, Omuk, Tanabume, Waringga, Weri, Wonaga
Tolikara	Danime		Ambena, Bumbu, Delegari, Gunombo, Mawi, Milipaa, Niagale, Ripa, Tarawi, Wania
Tolikara	Dow		Bire, Dagari, Dow / Bijere, Itoli, Pakare, Prawa, Sigou, Takri, Tigu, Vokuyo, Warka
Tolikara	Dundu (Ndundu)		Bimo, Dugunagep, Dundu, Kembu, Kurupu, Nakwi, Nilogabu, Nini, Nugini, Yiku
Tolikara	Egiam		Egiam, Kaliundi, Kurba, Murni, Pinde, Tabonakme, Wayongga, Weri, Yoka, Yonira
Tolikara	Geya		Alobaga, Dimbara, Geya, Jelepele, Kibu, Nawu, Timori, Tinagoga, Weyambi, Winalo, Witipur, Wunggilipur
Tolikara	Gika		Dimbara, Geka, Gelok, Kwa, Makido, Membramonggen, Tabunakme, Wanuwi, Wenigi, Yinuwanu
Tolikara	Gilubandu (Gilumbandu / Gilimbandu)		Baguni, Egoni, Kulutin, Lerewere, Martelo, Orelukban, Tinggom, Welesi, Yakep, Yamulo
Tolikara	Goyage		Angkasa, Benari, Bini, Bopa (Bobe), Didelonik, Doge, Dugi, Gilok, Goyage, Kumbur (Kumbu), Mampulaga (Nampulaga), Peko (Peku), Tidur Mabuk, Tigikun (Tagikun / Tigikum), Tigir, Tiri, Wijamurik, Woji, Yemarima (Yemarma)
Tolikara	Gundagi (Gudage)		Aworera, Enggawogo, Gingga, Gubuk, Gumbini, Kalarin, Kurik, Muruneri, Nangga, Oker, Punggelak, Umar, Wamili, Wamolo, Winengga, Wobe, Woraga
Tolikara	Kai		Again, Bawi, Kaiga, Kotorambur, Kurbaya, Piraleme, Tina, Tunggunale, Wiyangger, Wolu
Tolikara	Kamboneri		Berembanak, Habag, Kaloniki, Kamboniki, Kekoli, Malta, Marbuna, Tari
Tolikara	Kanggime (Kanggima)		Aulani, Dundu, Kagimaluk, Kanggime, Kerena, Lawor (Lawori), Ligiibak / Ligimbak (Lagimbak), Logon, Marlo, Purugi
Tolikara	Karubaga		Ampera, Beleme, Danggulurik, Ebenhaiser, Elsadai, Gininggadonak, Gurikagewa, Gurikme, Karubaga, Kimobur, Kiranage, Kogimagi, Kolilan, Kuloname, Kuragepura, Lirak, Losmen, Luwik, Molera, Muara, Nalorini, Pulanggun, Yalikaluk
Tolikara	Kembu		Agimdek, Aworera, Genani, Kabori, Kembu, Kobon, Mamit, Nugari, Tioga, Wulinaga, Yowo
Tolikara	Kondaga (Konda)		Arikoba, Arulo, Arumagi, Ganage, Gimo, Konda, Mandura, Mowilome, Silabulo, Tingapura, Yawineri
Tolikara	Kuari		Abepur, Alopur, Baliminggi, Gubagi, Jinulira, Kenen, Kibur, Kondegun, Kuari, Kurik, Luanggi, Markar, Menggeba, Menggenagame, Tebenalo, Umaga, Wanggugup
Tolikara	Kubu		Aruku, Kalewi, Kubu, Kubugiwa, Menggenagi, Minagi, Murik, Numbugawe, Tiyenggupur
Tolikara	Li Anogomma		Aburage, Bogome, Erimbur, Gubura, Kogoyapura, Leragawi / Megagirakuk, Longgoboma, Lubuk, Tingwi, Wiyaluk
Tolikara	Nabunage		Geningga, Jekito, Kimilo, Kumbo, Kupara, Kutime, Logilome, Missa, Nabunage, Timbindelo, Wewo
Tolikara	Nelawi		Barename / Luanggi, Kendemaya, Megapura, Minagame, Mondagul, Nelawi, Palagi, Tabowanimbo, Timojimo, Wabuna, Woromolome, Yilogonime / Tabinabo
Tolikara	Numba		Baliminggi, Guniki, Jinuwanu, Keragigelok, Kuma, Numba, Tingwineri, Yalogo, Yiragame, Yugumena
Tolikara	Nunggawi (Munggawi)		Barenggo (Berenggo / Berengga), Belep, Delelah (Delelak), Derek, Gilo, Kabumanggen (Kabomangen / Kubumangen), Kanggineri, Kilungga, Kipino, Kondangwi, Kononda (Kokondao), Kubalo, Kunipaga (Konipaga), Kuripaga (Kuripara), Mololowa, Nombori, Numbe, Nunggawi, Timobur (Kimobur), Tinoweno, Tomobur (Timopur), Tunibur, Undi, Wondame, Wonoluk, Woyi
Tolikara	Panaga		Eragani, Ibunuh, Kutiom, Paido, Panaga, Pindanggun, Saksi Maler, Siak, Yandono
Tolikara	Poganeri		Bogokila, Gagulineri, Genage, Gindugunik, Konengga, Kuoklanggunik, Mabuk, Nogari, Telekonok, Tigir
Tolikara	Tagime		Belela, Ekoni, Gabunam, Gulak, Kandimbaga, Kinebe, Kogotime, Melaga, Minggen, Peyola
Tolikara	Tagineri		Bini, Dunda, Getiem, Lamaluk, Logi, Rumbepaga, Silo, Tagi, Wanuk, Yimabnime
Tolikara	Telenggeme		Aukuni, Dolunggun, Kagi, Kimugu, Kimunuk, Linggira, Telenggeme, Tenek, Wekaru, Yagagobak
Tolikara	Timori		Bawi, Beremo, Bolubur, Eragani, Geneluk, Koinggambu, Liwina, Logulo, Luki, Pirage, Tioner, Tirib
Tolikara	Umagi		Gatini, Gurin, Mino, Nambu, Nolopur, Pagongga, Piriluk, Popaga, Umagi, Warna, Yaleme, Yali
Tolikara	Wakuwo		Golena, Gulak, Gunalo, Korlo, Kumbur, Kwarini, Nowo, Timer, Towolome, Wama, Weyage, Wonitu
Tolikara	Wari / Taiyeve II		Arebe / Ninggame, Beleise, Dorera, Dotori, Dustra / Yamiriko, Friji, Kalibu, Kowari, Kuruku, Laniloma, Muna, Papedari, Timoga / Kabupaga, Wakumendek, Wari / Taiyeve, Wiki, Yanora
Tolikara	Wenam		Baganagapur, Banggeri, Geyaneri, Igari, Kopenawai, Mili, Milineri, Telelomi, Tina, Wunggi
Tolikara	Wina		Akima, Bimbogul, Finai, Gualo, Holandia, Malela, Nakwil, Tawi, Wariru, Wina, Yogweme, Yugubuk, Yugumengga
Tolikara	Wonoki (Woniki)		Bugum, Lugwi, Mome, Pagona, Teropme, Wilileme, Wunabu, Yaliwak, Yangguni, Yigonime
Tolikara	Wugi		Buangludah, Gilime, Gitar, Koli, Kuagembur, Lena, Loma, Pindelo, Timoneri, Wugi, Wuronggi
Tolikara	Wunim (Wunin / Wumin)		Arombok, Enanagi, Gilopaga, Keribaga, Numbuboton, Pindak, Pokegi, Wona, Wurineri
Tolikara	Yuko		Ambirik, Giko, Gwak Dugunik, Karu, Kotorambur, Kungge, Minegimen, Miyanagame, Pekaleme, Tabuh, Teleme
Tolikara	Yuneri		Gembileme, Kanggilo, Mopi, Omibur, Tenabaga, Umar, Wenome, Wonabunggame, Yido, Yudimba, Yuneri
Yahukimo	Amuma		Amuma, Balum Erang, Golowen, Harapan, Kinika, Orugai, Plau, Sagasal, Sarmuge, Silorin, Tolikapura (Talikapura), Waeklek, Wisikma
Yahukimo	Anggruk		Hohe, Ilwap, Kiltam, Lelambo, Letin, Paliptek, Pilong, Suahi, Tohong, Tulpa, Vuno, Yaholikma
Yahukimo	Bomela		Bomela, Kitikni, Kubialat, Palamdua, Sombat, Yalmabi
Yahukimo	Dekai		Dekai, Keikey, Kiribun, Kokamu, Kuari, Kuaserama, Maruku, Massi, Muara, Sokamu, Tomon I (Toman I), Tomon II (Toman II)
Yahukimo	Dirwemna (Diruwena)		Aksal, Dirwemna, Dolsen, Salengkomo, Silion
Yahukimo	Duram		Dengat, Digitme, Duram, Goak, Niniwi, Yaminikma
Yahukimo	Endomen		Delon, Endomen, Galsin, Gidomen, Kouwet, Okloma (Oklahama), Sentul, Suron
Yahukimo	Hereapini (Hereanini)		Hereapini (Heriapini), Hoet, Homboki, Kabukal, Kinkun, Menetsing, Muhumu, Nelisa, Ohena, Pelentum (Palentum), Pue
Yahukimo	Hilipuk		Dindok, Hilipuk, Homidipmu, Jamin (Yamin), Kini, Sohondipmu, Yaruhuk
Yahukimo	Hogio (Hugio)		Dugumhad, Hogio Dua / II, Hogio Satu / I, Leleak, Paima, Sengsenagaik, Sipnidipmu, Subsal
Yahukimo	Holuon		Bineleruk, Danggema, Holuwon (Holuon), Sia, Sohonggik, Sosi, Weni
Yahukimo	Kabianggama (Kabianggema)		Bahabolma (Bahbolma), Buahun, Domul, Kabianggama, Sohal, Sohobma, Subayo
Yahukimo	Kayo		Alhai, Hombesaloma, Kayo, Molama, Sebu, Uase, Walet
Yahukimo	Kona		Kalpok, Kona (Konda), Kugun, Seklak, Wetmuk
Yahukimo	Koropun (Korupun)		Amdua, Basal, Batkuk, Dagi, Dildau, Koropun (Korupun), Maldua, Moo, Morome, Somsek, Wemin, Yamdua
Yahukimo	Kosarek		Hombuka, Illion, Konosa, Kosarek, Mine, Nahomas, Silkom, Tiple, Uldam, Wahe, Wesaltek
Yahukimo	Kurima		Air Garam, Anjelma, Eroma, Esalien, Hesmat, Hihundes, Huguma, Huken, Ibiroma, Kilise, Kima, Lotia (Huglot), Lukulema, Obolma, Parela, Pusuaga, Soroh, Tukuarek, Wakunyama, Wanem, Wulik Punua, Wuluagaima (Huluagaima), Yagarelo
Yahukimo	Kwelemdua (Kwelamdua)		Baluk, Debula, Kabulan, Kemligin, Kubuk Dua, Kwelemdua, Obis, Senayom, Sesepne, Yalidamon
Yahukimo	Kwikma		Enggelasue, Husmo, Karelma, Kenkeni, Momenggama, Monin, Oakbisik, Silakma, Soamarin (Soamrin), Usabini
Yahukimo	Langda		Alirji, Bebekle, Kap-Kap, Kirabuk, Langda, Laryi, Lukun, Wasumurji, Yalar (Yolar)
Yahukimo	Lolat		Bunde, Denema, Dinggila, Esalek, Lolat, Serahak, Wanim, Webile
Yahukimo	Mugi		Hendang (Hendag), Herawe, Hulesi, Hunenima, Ilokomo, Itlay Wopi, Kosihun, Lugulmu, Nyikinen, Olomisang, Panyoke, Seima, Togoluk, Ugem, Userem, Wanesi, Wemasili, Wesangma, Wusagasem, Yuarima
Yahukimo	Musaik		Bue, Dekbok, Esaikma, Haletuk, Hendikma, Lidipmu, Sumegen, Usaregeik (Usaragek), Weleheikma, Yeriko
Yahukimo	Nalca		Bolda, Cenderawasih, Emm, Hein, Imsekla, Luwemna, Manggona, Nalca
Yahukimo	Ninia		Babet, Hwealoma, Kahul, Liligan, Liligan II, Ninia, Niniahan, Sohwal, Waerek, Wahaik
Yahukimo	Nipsan		Biu, Ikmu, Ilukdamon, Nipsan, Serengan, Tapla, Walmak, Yalmun
Yahukimo	Obio		Busupa, Hom hom (Homhom), Jibak, Kwakenoro, Munu, Obio, Patin, Penigik, Pugun, Ujin, Wendame, Yagabo, Yahufa
Yahukimo	Panggema		Bineluk, Homtonggo (Homtongo), Kemumanggen, Kolu, Kuni, Masahan, Panggema, Potenikma (Pontenikma), Susek, Tonggoi, Tukam, Weresili, Yangkali
Yahukimo	Pasema		Leinoko (Lemoko), Lowet, Pasema, Pupi, Sengangge, Wea, Wulin
Yahukimo	Pronggoli (Proggoli)		Helapilik, Hiklahin, Huhulpunu, Lirutek, Piliam, Pontempilik (Pontenpelek), Pronggoli, Siwikma
Yahukimo	Puldama		Bako, Balsek, Baru, Famek, Kasen, Manbolak, Puldama, Semlu
Yahukimo	Samenage		Asotapo, Haleroma, Hirin, Hugilokon, Ison, Muke, Notnarek, Pona, Samenage
Yahukimo	Sela		Asok, Bera, Dolbol, Ejub, Hemuka, Holdomen, Horomon, Makero, Megom (Megon), Mekdua, Monamna, Mondon, Orisin, Phoy, Sela, Sulda
Yahukimo	Seredela (Seredala)		Burupmakot, Koper, Moruf, Mosomduba, Samboga, Seredala (Seredela), Teret, Tokuni, Yasip
Yahukimo	Silimo		Asia, Eksa, Eremnahom, Fabe, Hwesalemo, Momnowok (Momnowak), Nekilei, Pinda, Sagaduk, Sebin, Sianele, Silimo, Siloma, Silon, Sodule, Suet, Suok, Walkruk, Weakma, Wubialo
Yahukimo	Soba		Hepinis, Nilen, Soba, Surukmu, Tanda, Ugulintipmu
Yahukimo	Sobaham		Balinggama, Benembia, Dohong, Hamik, Hubik, Kulahaik, Puahuun, Sele, Silak Pahabol, Simbuk, Sobaham, Yabi (Jabi), Yalisomon
Yahukimo	Soloikma		Banga, Erim, Kwelena, Musan, Salbi, Singokla, Soline, Weawen (Weanem)
Yahukimo	Sumo		Boor, Hunisi, Jibuk, Kwiriside, Maku, Muara Balim, Obokain, Sumo, Uam, Wenapong, Wirilu
Yahukimo	Suntamon		Binalkon, Bongkok, Bulbul, Dirik, Masumkon, Suntamon, Tapasik, Yup
Yahukimo	Suru Suru		Gofa, Jinusugu, Rentis, Senipan, Solok, Worapi, Yosua
Yahukimo	Talambo		Bari, Kikila, Lelambo, Lelambo Dua (II), Lulum, Paleromon (Paleroman), Palukae, Tibul (Timbul), Wubri
Yahukimo	Tangma		Aleleng, Helo, Hipela, Huewi, Punno, Simeka, Tangma, Wamarek, Yalimo, Yeleas
Yahukimo	Ubahak		Bisifak, Furuluk, Keleng, Kibianggen, Koluang, Mabien, Nurap, Oblin, Pini, Saruk, Silong, Sosonikma (Sosomikma), Suhuntek, Tolombing, Ubahak, Wamuhuk, Welile
Yahukimo	Ubalihi		Hereki (Hereky), Letfet, Membaham (Mimbaham), Salakma, Samiyul, Sehelu, Talambela (Talempela), Ubalihion, Walahan, Wanan (Wanam), Wisomy (Wisomi)
Yahukimo	Ukha		Amisangi, Eki, Kuleken, Lua, Musanarek, Siolorema, Ukha, Walialema, Wenapuk, Yelepunu
Yahukimo	Walma		Honggolek (Honggoluk), Hontulun, Solinggul (Solingul), Walma, Werene, Weri, Wewasi, Yetehup
Yahukimo	Werima		Esema Husage, Hagawen, Hanoasuok, Hepia, Libuk, Lokon, Luarima, Nesuwen, Suesi, Weasi (Hesmat), Weriaput, Werima, Wesagalep, Wesama
Yahukimo	Wusama (Wusuma)		Apdagma (Apdakma), Harap, Kolodoma, Mugi (Mogi), Mul, Sabin, Sangatur, Sowaling, Suok, Walkuma, Yerekama
Yahukimo	Yahuliambut		Amfulma, Linggisen, Subundalek, Suksale, Tanggeam
Yahukimo	Yogosem		Esahapuk, Hokolekma, Kiroma, Mesahaput, Saikama, Sogasio, Yogosem
Yalimo	Abenaho		Abagima, Abenaho, Akris, Alugi, Amuki, Arikbalek, Babin, Beim, Bohum, Bonahik, Bonggi, Bukurik, Bumbum, Burim, Dahonaikma, Dama, Dombomi, Dosumo, Elesim, Eliyekma (Eliekma), Fialem, Fuahe, Fuim, Gefido (Gefindo), Halifur, Halisek, Heahobak, Helaksili, Hombanma (Hombanman), Horakia, Horenikma, Hubliki, Hubualma (Hobualma), Hulhule, Hulikma, Humalma, Hundilip, Hurualma, Jinggiwi, Kaboholik (Kawokholik), Kandibung, Kelesu (Klesu), Kesuwi, Kewi, Kolaima, Kule, Lakongkong (Langongkok), Landikma, Lasikma, Lilimuhuk (Lilinmuhuk), Lilluikma (Lilukikma), Lohomabel, Mahiyal (Mahial), Maleo, Moban, Mulip, Musanahikma, Nenomani, Noholuok, Obabin, Pamumu, Pirikalem, Sabilironggo, Sahikma, Salo, Salohe, Sapiwarek, Sebi, Sohi, Sohombunu, Sombule, Somohi, Suahe, Suele, Sumbul, Suminaikma, Tagabaga, Uluhufuk, Ulukhumi, Ulun, Ulusi, Usabiye, Wafuhuk, Waghasilimo, Walagima, Wambal, Wambalfak, Wambo, Wamhor, Wanam, Wanggibo, Wanggun (Wangkun), Wanwal (Wanmal), Waroham, Wilak, Wileroma, Wilofing, Witlanggo (Wiltlanggo), Wiwulik, Worowi (Worol), Wutlarin, Yabusup, Yahatma, Yama, Yambaikma, Yanamik, Yawan, Yuktanggo (Yutanggo)
Yalimo	Apalapsili		Alimuhuk, Apalapsili, Asiligma, Asilikma, Baptekma (Babtekma), Benyam, Eal, Falukwalilo, Fari, Filiahik (Filiyahik), Habalo, Hinanggoambut (Hinongkoambut), Holukalem (Holuokalem), Holuogalma (Holuaogalma), Hubliki, Hukalopunu, Humalem (Humalen), Ilirek, Kelampurim, Kengkenbun (Kengggembun), Kilat, Kinhe, Kulet, Kundikele, Lambukmu, Lilinsaluk, Makrig, Molinggi (Moliyinggi), Nanahoruk, Nasinema (Nasinena), Natoksili, Nohonil, Orohon, Pipisim, Pong, Sabilikalem, Sabualo, Sien, Sobikambut, Suerlihim (Suerelihim), Suwewili (Suweli), Temput (Tembut), Tikano, Wanamalo, Wasalalo, Wiralesili, Wiyukwilik, Yarema (Yarema Satu), Yeptek (Yeftek), Yohul
Yalimo	Benawa		Ampera, Dukunasi, Gilika, Himi, Ikon, Iyap, Kamika, Kapawa, Karamina, Key, Konobun, Kukdomol, Kutakuruk, Lawe, Lulum, Makrip, Martaru, Miyawi (Niyawi), Naira, Narau, Neigase, Nihol (Mihol), Nungkere, Nuorok, Paluke, Pensale, Pepera, Puruku, Siwa, Thamaksin, Tiwayi, Trikora, Uramburu, Wermas, Wibi, Wirsa, Yakwa
Yalimo	Elelim		Aluis, Bulmu, Duwong, Elelim (Elilem), Emon, Eregi, Fima, Helabu, Hesmat, Hiling, Hobakma, Honita, Isila, Kalak, Kwikma, Maribu, Molinggu, Momonhusi, Ohoam (Ohobam), Ohoniam, Olani, Pangkik, Pasimbolo, Pihel, Pirip, Pisireg, Pungkahik, Sili, Sipsoi, Sipson, Sira, Sohi, Sowi, Tanapasir, Ubi, Ulo, Wagagu, Walkep, Warikma, Wasua, Wekolani, Werekma, Yabema, Yakikma
Yalimo	Welarek		Ambiliki, Ampolongsili, Amuluk, Feingkama, Fikfak, Folongsili, Halialo, Halisek, Hamboik, Helebol, Hilariki, Hindalimuhuk (Hindalimukuk), Hobut, Holowi, Irarek, Kampol, Kayalem, Kayo, Koum, Langam, Lasik, Mabualem, Mamion (Mamioan), Menepini, Mohobiye, Mohonu, Mondek (Montek), Nangkulamulan, Nohonil, Pami, Panal, Panalulun, Pikohofari (Dikohobari), Pirang, Pisanggo, Poholanggen, Poik (Poik Satu), Punui (Funui), Sakam, Salema, Saly, Samaria, Seherek, Selebi, Selek, Silfal, Sinahal, Soharam, Sukalimi, Sumtan (Suntam), Tahamak, Tinmuhuk, Ubalihi, Ulum, Walingkapma, Wasupahik, Welarek, Welarekpunu (Welearekpunu), Werenggik, Wompoli, Yahamer

== See also ==
- List of districts of Central Papua
- List of districts of South Papua
- List of districts of West Papua
