= List of incumbent regional heads and deputy regional heads in Highland Papua =

The following is an article about the list of Regional Heads and Deputy Regional Heads in 8 regencies/cities in Highland Papua who are currently still serving.

== List ==
| Regency/ City | Photo of the Regent/ Mayor | Regent/ Mayor | Photo of Deputy Regent/ Mayor | Deputy Regent/ Mayor | Taking Office | End of Office (Planned) | Ref. |
|---|---|---|---|---|---|---|---|
| Jayawijaya; Regency List of Regents/Deputy Regents | | Athenius Murip | | Ronny Elopere | 20 February 2025 | 20 February 2030 | |
| Lanny Jaya; Regency List of Regents/Deputy Regents | | Aletinus Yigibalom | | Fredi Ginia Tabuni | 20 February 2025 | 20 February 2030 | |
| Central Mamberamo; Regency List of Regents/Deputy Regents | | Yonas Kenelak | | Itaman Thago | 20 February 2025 | 20 February 2030 | |
| Nduga; Regency List of Regents/Deputy Regents | | Yoas Beon | | | 30 December 2025 | 20 February 2030 | |
| Bintang Mountains; Regency List of Regents/Deputy Regents | | Spei Yan Bidana | | Arnold Nam | 20 February 2025 | 20 February 2030 | |
| Tolikara; Regency List of Regents/Deputy Regents | | Willem Wandik | | Yotam Wonda | 20 February 2025 | 20 February 2030 | |
| Yahukimo; Regency List of Regents/Deputy Regents | | Didimus Yahuli | | Esau Miram | 20 February 2025 | 20 February 2030 | |
| Yalimo; Regency List of Regents/Deputy Regents | | Nahor Nekwek | | Yan Kiraklak | 20 February 2025 | 20 February 2030 | |

Notes

- "Commencement of office" is the inauguration date at the beginning or during the current term of office. For acting regents/mayors, it is the date of appointment or extension as acting regent/mayor.
- Based on the Constitutional Court decision Number 27/PUU-XXII/2024, the Governor and Deputy Governor, Regent and Deputy Regent, and Mayor and Deputy Mayor elected in 2020 shall serve until the inauguration of the Governor and Deputy Governor, Regent and Deputy Regent, and Mayor and Deputy Mayor elected in the 2024 national simultaneous elections as long as the term of office does not exceed 5 (five) years.

== See also ==
- Highland Papua
