= Noken system =

Electoral system in parts of Indonesia

The noken system, or ikat system, is a voting practice used in parts of Indonesia's Western New Guinea (Papua) that deviates from standard national electoral practices. The name refers to noken bags, which are widely used in the region and hold cultural value. In areas that use the noken system, voting is carried out by communities, either through public agreement on vote allocation or through the delegation of votes to a tribal leader. There is no law establishing noken voting, but its use has been approved by the Constitutional Court of Indonesia as an expression of customary practices.

It is unclear when noken voting was first used, but it was established as a formal practice following the approval of the Constitutional Court in 2009. There is no standard process for noken voting. Each polling station establishes a voting process in cooperation with local tribal chiefs and political parties. Broadly, there are two forms of noken voting, namely a "big man" form where a tribal chief votes for all members of their community, and a "hanging noken" system where votes are counted using noken bags that represent different candidates. In all cases, votes are effectively public, and this contrasts with the standard Indonesian electoral practice where individuals mark their candidate choice on a ballot paper.

The use of the noken system is considered to empower voters in the regencies using the system, as they may otherwise be unable to vote due to reasons of literacy, or due to the geographic remoteness of polling stations. The stated cultural justification is that the voting system reflects a tradition of selecting leaders through community consensus or acclamation. However, the system is criticised for its lack of a secret ballot, and for reducing individual choice due to the large influence of tribal chiefs. Noken voting is used in national elections alongside other areas using standard voting, creating strange quirks such as 100% turnout and 100% support for candidates. Areas using the noken system elect fewer women than other areas, and disputes over the results from the system have resulted in court cases and violence.

== Name ==
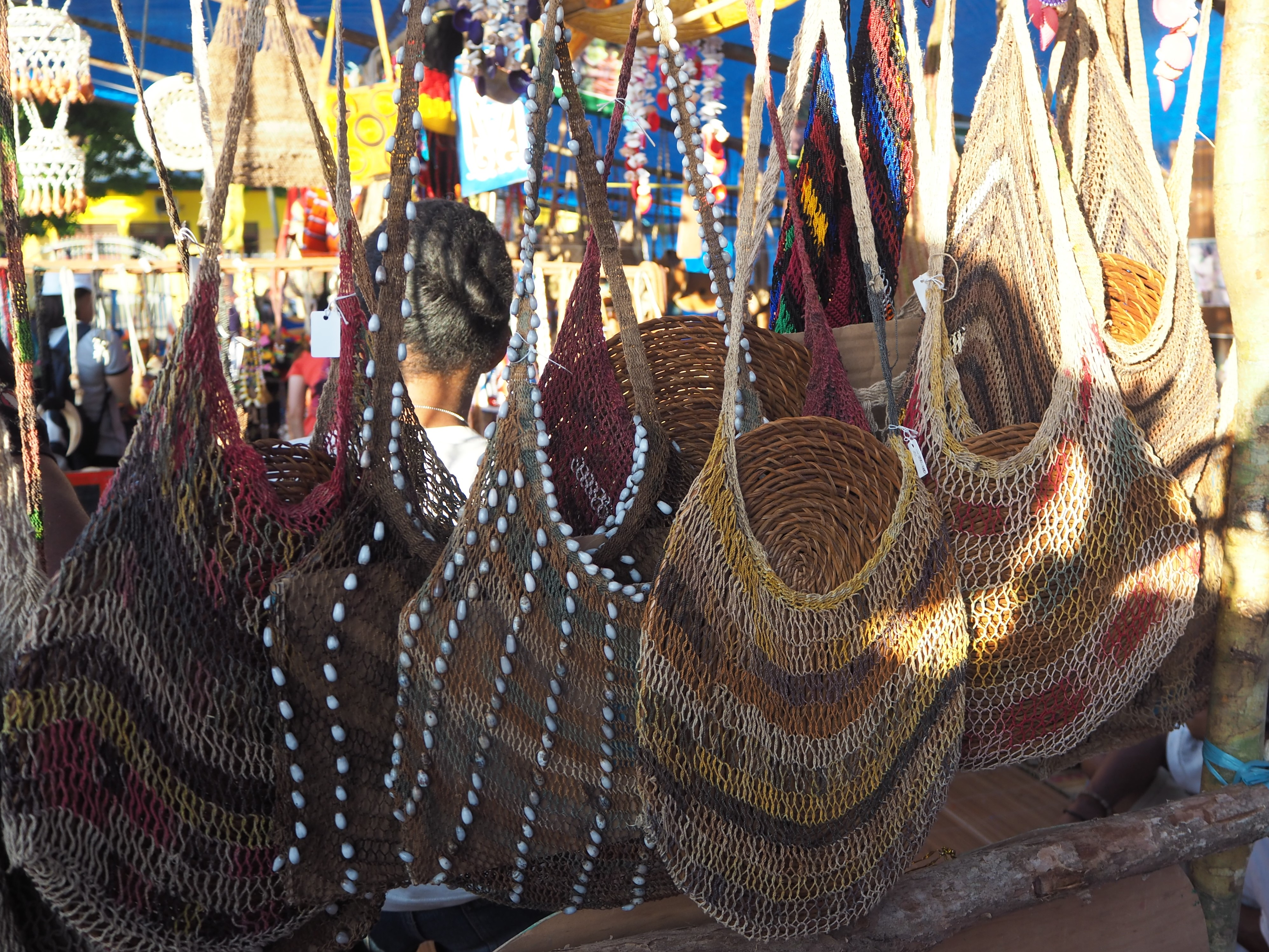
Noken bags are strongly associated with local cultures in Western New Guinea

The voting system is named after traditional noken bags, which are weaved from bark and play an important role in the lives of Papuan communities. The system is also referred to as the ikat system. The term does not refer to a specific practice, instead vaguely encompassing any voting method linked to traditional customs. The importance of noken bags to West Papuan people means they are an effective symbol for the electoral system, reflecting a statement of cultural values, even if the actual use of noken bags is tangential.

== System ==
The noken system refers to voting practices that differ from the standard practice used in Indonesian elections. There are no laws or regulations establishing the noken system. Tribal chiefs may cast votes on behalf of their entire communities. In some cases the community votes as one, while in other cases the community agrees on how to divide their votes. The system where votes are delivered by a single tribal chief is known as the bungkus or 'big man' system. In the noken gantung (hanging bag) system, noken bags are directly used as substitute ballot boxes. However, unlike standard ballot boxes, these are public rather than private. Votes are generally placed inside bags representing different candidates as a substitute for marking ballot papers. In some polling stations, votes are taken by headcount rather than by ballots. The noken bags representing candidates are sometimes hung directly around people's necks. The bags are often accompanied by names and pictures of their associated candidates. Sometimes ballots are submitted to electoral officials in a noken bag.

Electoral authorities work with tribal chiefs and political parties to ensure the system functions. Agreements for the use of a particular system are made by agreement at each polling station. While specific practices are diverse, in all variations the system reflects the significant influence of tribal chiefs and lacks a secret ballot. Noken bags give the process cultural meaning, and votes are considered collective rather than individual. In many cases, communities will meet prior to the election to discuss the vote, with tribal chiefs responsible for explaining candidate choices.

== Usage ==
Regencies in which the noken system was used in 2019 and prior to 2019 (pink)

Regencies in which the noken system was used in 2024 (grey hatched) (Note: Central Mamberamo Regency, Deiyai Regency, Dogiyai Regency, Intan Jaya Regency, Jayawijaya Regency, Lanny Jaya Regency, Nduga Regency, Paniai Regency, Puncak Regency, Puncak Jaya Regency, Tolikara Regency, and Yahukimo Regency)

The noken system is used within the two provinces of Western New Guinea in Indonesia, Central Papua and Highland Papua. This region is very mountainous, with difficult terrain separating remote communities. Many residents of these areas are Indigenous and have distinct ethnic and cultural identities. Running elections is further complicated by low literacy rates, which makes even finding poll workers difficult. The number of registered voters often does not match census records, with 2013 electoral rolls in some regencies exceeding 150% of the 2010 census population.

The system is an alternative to direct voting, which usually in Indonesia is expressed through the "coblos" system where ballots are punched to indicate the individual voted for. The coblos system is used in some parts of regencies using the noken system, in particular the urban areas. According to the Constitutional Court, only areas that have previously used the noken system may be allowed to continue to use it, although it has not ruled on which areas qualify.

== Impacts and implications ==
The noken system allows votes to be cast even when direct participation in an election would be challenged by literacy or geography. It is sometimes viewed as a transparent system due to votes being open to the local community, as contrasted with opaque ballot boxes. It is defended as an expression of culture that creates a link between tribal governance and electoral politics.

However, the system also results in the public individual votes being influenced, especially those of women. Women are less likely to be elected, with noken votes usually controlled by male tribal chiefs. While political parties are required to run a list including female candidates, women in areas using the noken system may not even be able to vote for themselves. Tribal and customary borders may not align with formal administrative borders, creating uncertainty over who a tribal chief represents.

The reliance on unmarked ballots opens the system up to potential electoral fraud. Tribal chiefs may not accurately reflect their communities. Even when votes are individual, unused votes might be appropriated by tribal chiefs. Candidates have disputed the results at times, and the areas involved are more prone to electoral violence than elsewhere in the country, with 71 electoral violence-related deaths recorded from 2009 to 2017. It is thought the noken system contributes to electoral disputes.

Candidates can make agreements as to the number of votes they will receive through noken votes, facilitating block voting. In 2012, each subdistrict in Nduga Regency was provided the same number of ballot papers under a local agreement to ensure each had an equal impact on the electoral result, regardless of the actual number of people within each subdistrict. Leaders from different villages may meet to discuss what the eventual electoral results will be. A supported candidate may receive 100% of the votes, while if there is no popular candidate, the votes might be split evenly. Agreements on how to divide votes have been disputed, with miscommunications leading to violence.

The noken system produces odd electoral results, such as turnouts reaching 100% and candidates receiving 100% of votes. This provides a structural advantage to areas using the noken system, and thus to candidates with support in those areas.

== History ==
It is unclear what the historical basis of the noken system is, when it was first used, or in what form. While it is possible that there may be precedents for the noken system dating back to the 1969 Act of Free Choice, it also may have only really emerged in 2004, when Indonesia began to hold local elections.

Democratisation following the fall of the Suharto regime included the creation of special autonomy for the provinces of Indonesian Western New Guinea in 2001. This territory is extremely diverse ethnically and linguistically, with many remote areas in difficult terrain. Tribes in Western New Guinea continue to follow customary law.

In 2009 the noken system was used in parts of Paniai Regency, Puncak Jaya Regency, and Yahukimo Regency. Results in the Yahukimo Regency were disputed, reaching the Constitutional Court of Indonesia in a case brought by Elion Numberi. The court rulted that the noken system was a valid method of electoral choice that would reflect customary practices (adat) and decrease conflict, allowing for voting by agreement or acclamation. Customary practices are protected under the constitution of Indonesia, and the court felt imposing national standards on these areas might prove detrimental.

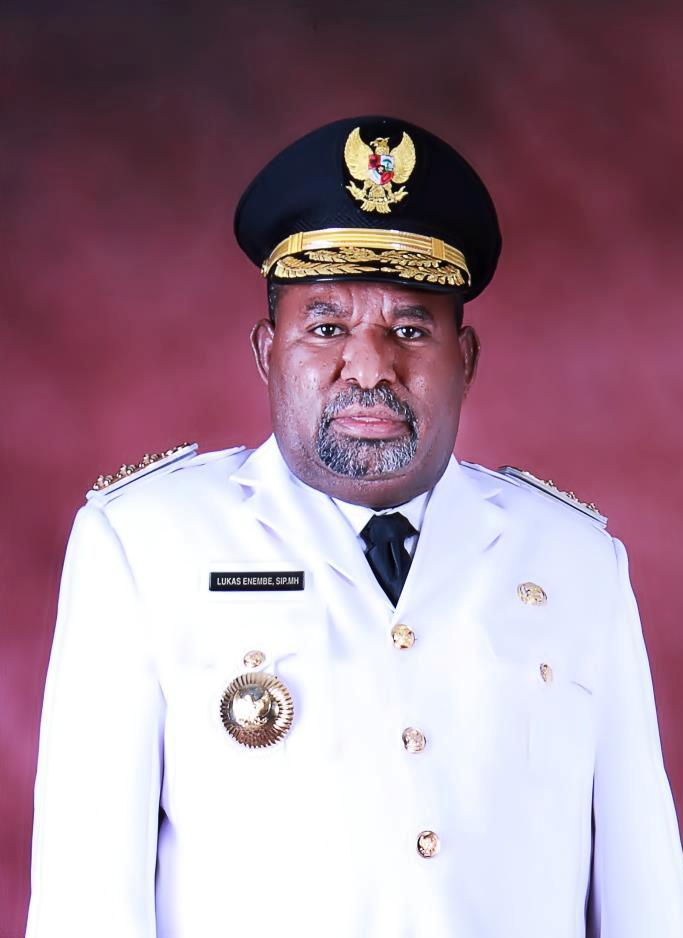
The election of Lukas Enembe as governor of Papua in 2013 relied heavily on votes originating from the noken system

To create a consistent system, in 2013 the General Elections Commission of Papua province issued guidelines for the use of noken at polling stations, under which electoral workers would be responsible for marking ballot papers according to the noken bag they were deposited in. The system was used in parts of 10 regencies during the 2013 Papua gubernatorial election. This saw Lukas Enembe elected as governor of Papua due to turnouts of 100% in nine highland districts, while turnout in urban areas was around 60%. Enembe was an advocate of the noken system. Rules for the use of the system were only agreed two weeks before the vote, and electoral observers reported there being no consistency in its implementation. The results were disputed by all other candidates, however the constitutional court ruled that the evidence of electoral fraud was not “structured, systematic and massive”.

Despite some guidelines being put in place, jurisdictional disputes have arisen between national, provincial, and district general elections commissions over responsibility for running noken elections. Disputes arose over the implementation of the noken system in 2011, 2012, 2013, and 2014. During the 2014 Indonesian presidential election, the noken system was used in 16 regencies. Losing candidate Prabowo Subianto claimed the use of the noken system did not provide for an actual election. In all cases, the court determined that the system was legal and in keeping with the constitution.

The Constitutional Court declared itself unable to rule on local election disputes in 2014, although the national legislature restored this power in 2016. Disputes reached the court again in 2017. The General Election Supervisory Agency called the noken system undemocratic in 2016, calling for it to be abolished. However, it still arranged for the system's use in the 2017 Indonesian local elections. In this election, a dispute arose in Dogiyai Regency over the planned use of the noken system, with the local Dogiyai election committee rejecting the decision of the provincial Papua election committee to use noken in the regency, stating that the practice had no history of use in Dogiyai.

In 2019, the noken system was used by 12 regencies for the 2019 Indonesian general election. In some regencies the standard voting system was used in some districts or villages (Dekai in Yahukimo, 3 villages in Jayawijaya, two villages in Central Mamberamo, five districts and more villages in Lanny Jaya, and 3 villages in Tolikara). A dispute over results on 25 April 2019 led to arrows being exchanged. Electoral irregularities were identified in some districts.

In 2020 the chairman of the Papuan People's Assembly gave a statement in support of ending the noken system in light of its discriminatory impact on women. In 2024 the General Election Supervisory Agency again stated that the system was undemocratic, and should be abolished, leading to discussions on its future over the coming decades. Nonetheless, it was used in parts of the same 12 regencies as 2019, now part of Highland Papua and Central Papua, during the 2024 Indonesian general election. In the six Highland Papua regencies (Central Mamberamo Regency, Jayawijaya Regency, Lanny Jaya Regency, Nduga Regency, Tolikara Regency, and Yahukimo Regency) specific districts and villages were excluded from the system, except for Nduga Regency where it was available at all polling stations. In the Central Papua regencies (Deiyai Regency, Dogiyai Regency, Intan Jaya Regency, Paniai Regency, Puncak Regency, and Puncak Jaya Regency) the noken system was available at all polling stations. In an additional two regencies of Highland Papua (Yalimo Regency and Bintang Mountains Regency) noken were available, but only to store ballots that had been regularly marked through the normal system.

The responsibility for administering the system fell to the Kelompok Penyelenggara Pemungutan Suara (KPPS). The KPPS is tasked with providing noken bags, although communities may also submit their own noken. They also verify the identity of voting tribal chiefs. Once processed, the KPPS translate votes into a normal count that aligns with the standard Indonesian system. Following the 2024 elections, female candidates in Nduga Regency issued a joint statement in opposition to the bungkus method of voting, which led to female candidates receiving very few votes. An electoral dispute following a candidate receiving zero votes in parts of Central Papua reached the constitutional court in April 2024.
