= 2024 Highland Papua gubernatorial election =

- 27 November 2024
- Turnout: 99.88%
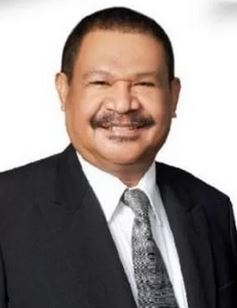

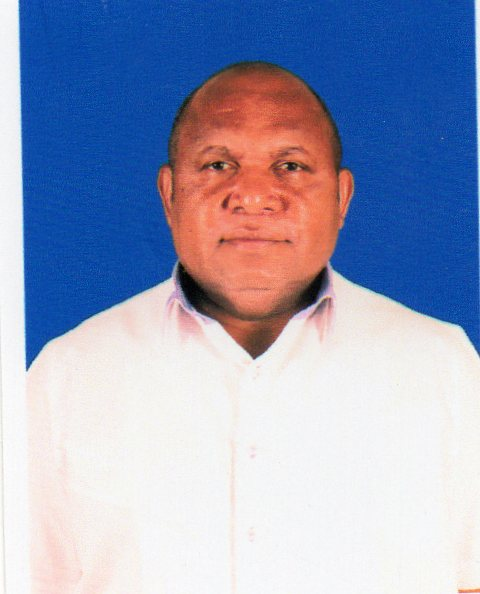
Candidate	John Tabo	Befa Yigibalom
Party	Golkar	NasDem
Alliance	–	KIM Plus
Running mate	Ones Pahabol	Natan Pahabol
Popular vote	720,925	564,280
Percentage	56.09%	43.91%
- Results by district
Governor before election
Velix Wanggai (acting)
Independent
Elected Governor
John Tabo
Golkar

The 2024 Highland Papua gubernatorial election was held on 27 November 2024 as part of nationwide local elections to elect the governor of Highland Papua for a five-year term. It was the first gubernatorial for the province since its formation in 2022. The election was won by Mamberamo Raya Regent John Tabo of Golkar with 56% of the vote. His sole opponent, Befa Yigibalom, received 43%.

== Electoral system ==
The election, like other local elections in 2024, follow the first-past-the-post system where the candidate with the most votes wins the election, even if they do not win a majority. It is possible for a candidate to run uncontested, in which case the candidate is still required to win a majority of votes "against" an "empty box" option. Should the candidate fail to do so, the election will be repeated on a later date.

In Highland Papua, elections in six out of eight regencies are conducted through the noken system, where votes are cast collectively by tribal leaders.

== Candidates ==
According to electoral regulations, in order to qualify for the election, candidates are required to secure support from a political party or a coalition of parties controlling 9 seats (20 percent of all seats) in the Highland Papua House of Representatives (DPRPP). Candidates may alternatively demonstrate support to run as an independent in form of photocopies of identity cards, but no such candidates registered prior to the deadline set by the General Elections Commission (KPU) on 12 May 2024.

=== Potential ===
The following are individuals who have either been publicly mentioned as a potential candidate by a political party in the DPRPP, publicly declared their candidacy with press coverage, or considered as a potential candidate by media outlets:

- John Tabo (Golkar), regent of Mamberamo Raya, former regent of Tolikara, chairman of Golkar's Highlands Papua branch.
- Befa Yigibalom (PKS), regent of Lanny Jaya.
- Ones Pahabol (Demokrat), regent of Yahukimo.

== Results ==
Candidate	Running mate	Party	Votes	%
John Tabo	Ones Pahabol	Golkar	720,925	56.09
Befa Yigibalom	Natan Pahabo	NasDem Party	564,280	43.91
Total			1,285,205	100.00
Valid votes			1,285,205	99.46
Invalid/blank votes			6,947	0.54
Total votes			1,292,152	100.00
Registered voters/turnout			1,293,683	99.88
Source: KPU
