= Jayawijaya Regency =

Regency in Highland Papua, Indonesia

Jayawijaya Regency Kabupaten Jayawijaya
- Regency
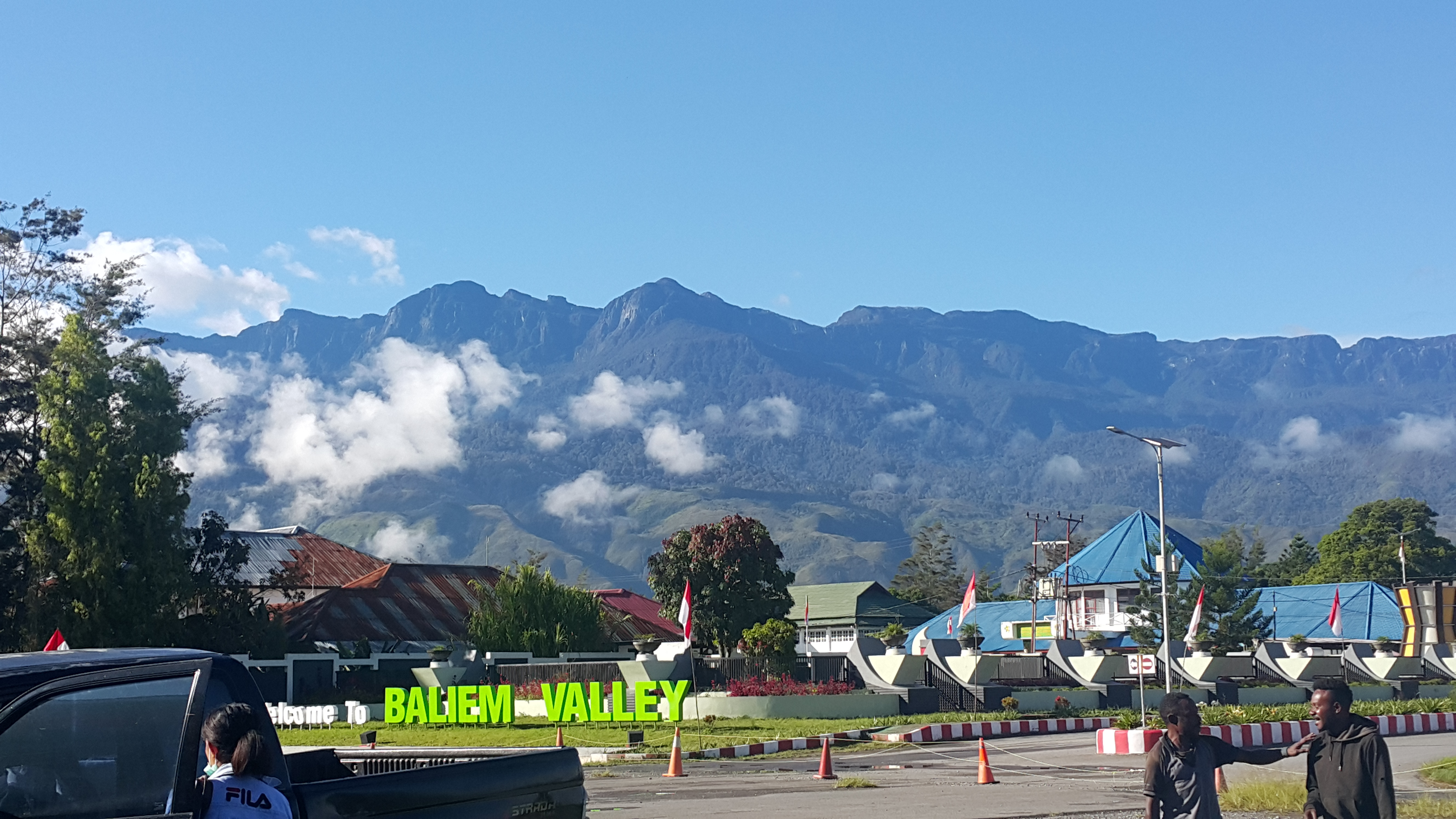
- Wamena Airport

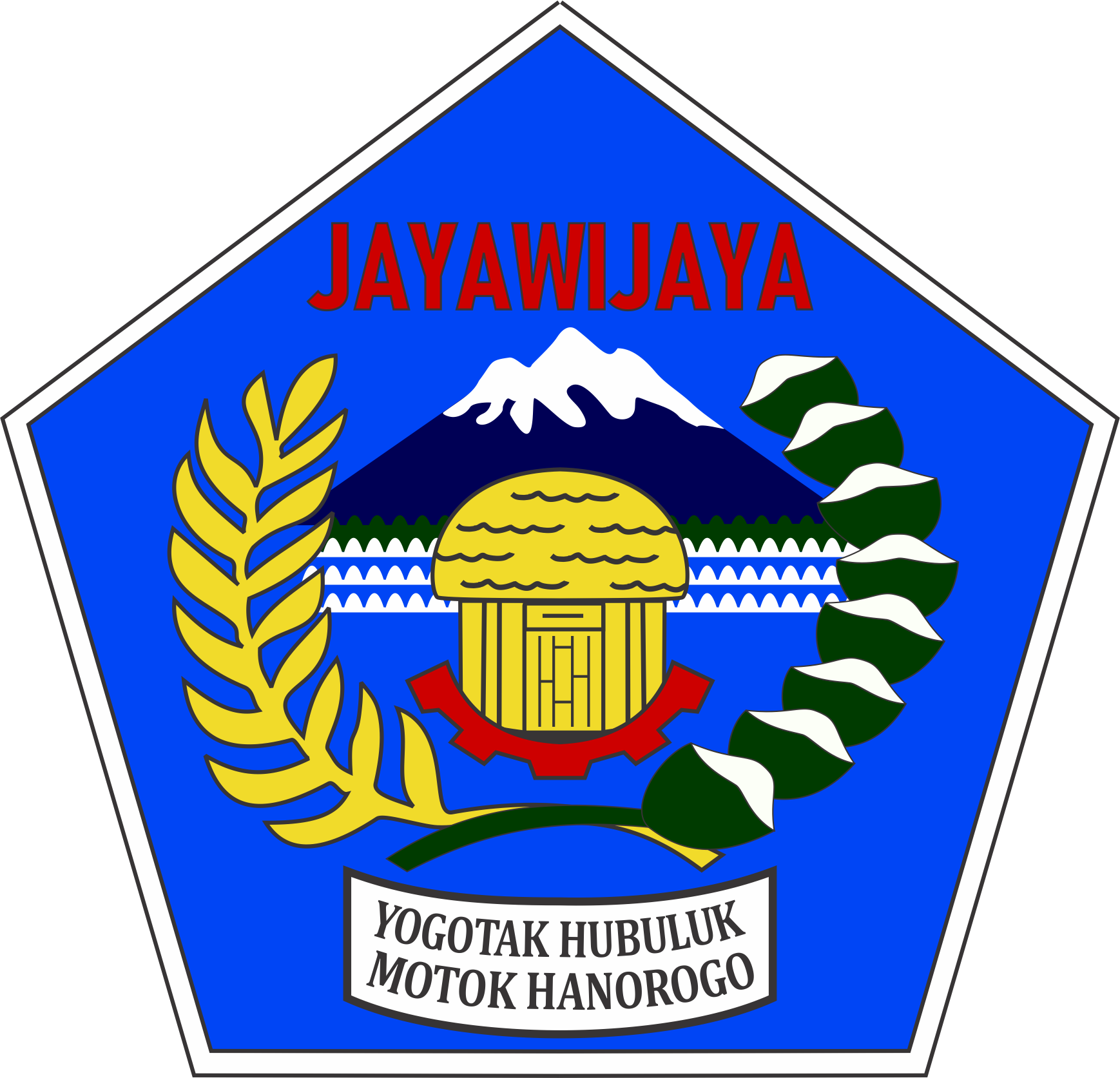
- Seal
- Motto(s): Yogotak Hubuluk Mutuk Hanorogo (Tomorrow Must Be Better Than Today)
- Location in Highland Papua

- Location in Indonesian Papua Location in Indonesia
- Coordinates: 4.0833°S 139.0833°E
- Country: Indonesia
- Province: Highland Papua
- Regency seat: Wamena

Government
  - Regent: Atenius Murip (Gerindra)
  - Vice Regent: Ronny Elopere
  - Legislature: Jayawijaya Regency House of Representatives

Area
  - Total: 2,629.01 km^{2} (1,015.07 sq mi)

Population (mid 2023 estimate)
  - Total: 282,497
  - Density: 107.454/km^{2} (278.304/sq mi)
- Time zone: UTC+9 (Indonesia Eastern Time)
- Area code: (+62) 969
- Website: jayawijayakab.go.id

Jayawijaya Regency is one of the regencies (kabupaten) in the Indonesian province of Highland Papua. It occupies an area of 13,925.31 km^{2} in the Baliem Valley, situated in the central highlands of the province. It had a population of 196,085 at the 2010 Census, and 269,553 at the 2020 Census; the official estimate as of mid-2023 was 282,497. Its regency seat is the town of Wamena.

== History ==
As created, Jayawijaya Regency covered an area coincident with the whole of what in 2022 became Highland Papua Province. However, on 11 December 2002 three new Regencies - Bintang Mountains Regency (Kabupaten Pegunungan Bintang), Tolikara Regency, and Yahukimo Regency - were created from parts of Jayawijaya Regency. Subsequently on 4 January 2008 another four new Regencies - Lanny Jaya Regency, Central Mamberamo Regency (Kabupaten Mamberamo Tengah), Nduga Regency, and Yalimo Regency - were created from further parts of Jayawijaya Regency. All eight regencies were brought together again in 2022 in the new province of Highland Papua.

== Administrative districts ==
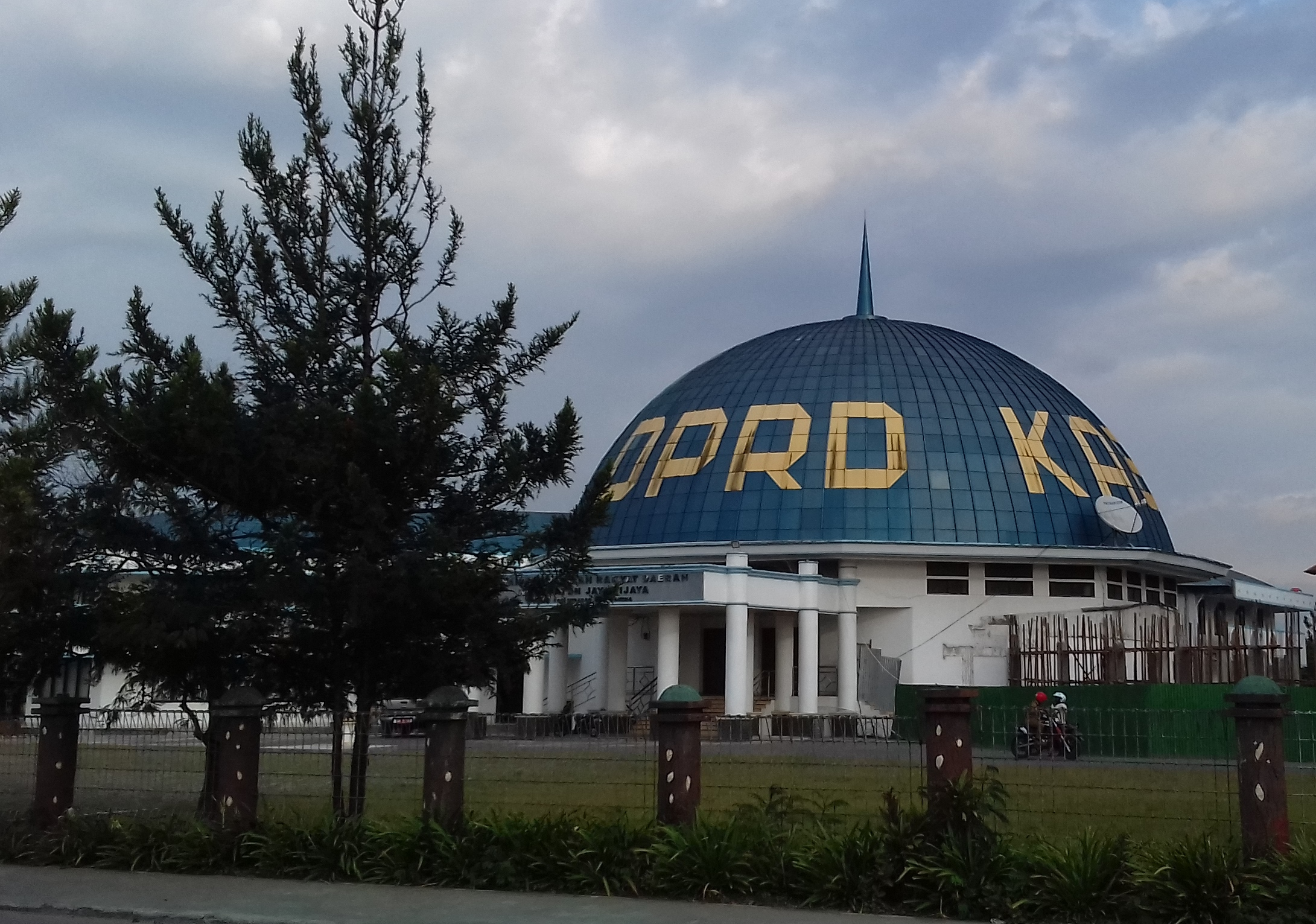
Regional People's Representative Council of Jayawijaya Regency building in Wamena

At the time of the 2010 Census, the Jayawijaya Regency comprised eleven districts (distrik), listed below with their populations at the 2010 Census. During the following ten years, the number of districts was raised to forty by the splitting of existing districts, and these are all shown below with their current areas and their populations at the 2010 Census and the 2020 Census, together with the official estimates as of mid-2023. The table also includes the locations of the district administrative centres, the number of administrative villages or subdistricts in each district (totaling 328 rural kampung (villages) and 4 urban kelurahan (subdistricts)), and its postcode.

Kode Wilayah	Name of District (distrik)	Area in km^{2}	Pop'n 2010 Census	Pop'n 2020 Census	Pop'n mid 2023 Estimate	Admin centre	No. of villages or subdistricts	Post code
95.01.01	Wamena	249.31	59,887	64,967	66,080	Wamena Kota	11 ^{(a)}	99511
95.01.09	Asolokobal	375.51	15,349	4,985	5,515	Asolokobal	9	99501
95.01.06	Walelagama	412.33	11,181	2,871	2,525	Walelagama	6	99510
95.01.12	Trikora	190.07		1,472	1,497	Trikora	6	99508
95.01.13	Napua	246.64		5,425	5,518	Napua	9	99505
95.01.14	Walaik	176.33		3,287	3,343	Walaik	5	99509
95.01.15	Wouma	243.09		6,760	6,876	Wouma	7	99514
95.01.35	Walesi	250.21		3,045	3,369	Walesi	7	99512
95.01.36	Asotipo	319.57		9,913	10,969	Asotipo	10	99502
95.01.37	Maima	188.61		7,083	7,837	Maima	7	99504
95.01.04	Hubikosi	547.90	17,495	8,218	7,907	Hubikosi	11	99552
95.01.10	Pelebaga	514.18	10,220	14,197	16,900	Wililimo	13	99554
95.01.17	Ibele	333.13		9,089	10,819	Ibele	10	99553
95.01.18	Tailarek	320.79		3,809	4,534	Taelarek	8	99555
95.01.16	Hubikiak	541.70		14,056	13,525	Hubikiak	8	99551
95.01.03	Asologaima	182.37	37,535	5,073	4,550	Kimbim	10	99531
95.01.07	Musatfak	994.85	7,209	4,203	3,770	Temia	10	99533
95.01.30	Silo Karno Doga	309.75		5,065	4,543	Wonenggulik	8	99535
95.01.31	Piramid	297.18		5,122	4,594	Pyramid	10	99534
95.01.32	Muliama	337.83		5,780	5,184	Muliama	12	99532
95.01.39	Warne	168.16		1,927	1,728	Warne	4	99536
95.01.02	Kurulu	492.33	24,732	7,039	6,313	Jiwika	12	99521
95.01.21	Usilimo	321.58		3,567	3,199	Usilimo	10	99524
95.01.22	Wita Waya	217.24		2,058	1,846	Tulem	5	99526
95.01.23	Libarek	213.23		2,287	2,051	Muliama	5	99522
95.01.24	Wadangku	219.90		2,471	2,216	Wadangku	5	99525
95.01.25	Pisugi	336.03		3,253	2,918	Pisugi	7	99523
95.01.05	Bolakme	429.07	7,175	5,117	5,901	Bolakme	12	99541
95.01.08	Wolo	339.67	3,068	8,912	12,470	Wolo	8	99548
95.01.11	Yalengga	689.06	2,244	3,051	3,723	Yalengga	11	99549
95.01.27	Tagime	406.26		5,795	6,682	Tagime	11	99546
95.01.28	Molagalome	228.67		2,644	3,049	Molagalome	6	99545
95.01.29	Tagineri	291.59		3,495	4,030	Tagineri	9	99547
95.01.33	Bugi	463.83		3,655	5,114	Bugi	8	99543
95.01.34	Bpiri	348.12		1,629	2,280	Dlonggoki	7	99542
95.01.26	Koragi	465.94		3,428	4,183	Koragi	5	99544
95.01.40	Wesaput	249.31		10,448	10,627	Ilokama	8 ^{(b)}	99513
95.01.20	Siepkosi	354.72		3,376	3,028	Siepkosi	9	99507
95.01.19	Itlay Hisage	498.95		4,370	3,919	Lukaken	9	99503
95.01.38	Popugoba	160.30		6,611	7,315	Popugoba	4	99506
	Totals	13,925.31	196,085	269,553	282,497	Wamena	332	

Notes:
(a) including the three kelurahan of Wamena Kota, Sinakma, and Sinapuk.
(b) including the kelurahan of Ilokama.

Note that those districts with 2010 populations given in the 2010 Population column (and numbered from 95.01.01 to 95.01.11) were the eleven districts extent in 2010; the remaining twenty-nine districts with no figure given in the 2010 Population column (and numbered from 95.01.12 to 95.01.40) were those created from the original eleven districts subsequent to 2010.
