= Paro, Indonesia =

Paro
- Village
- Location in Nduga, Highland Papua Location in Indonesian Papua Location in Indonesia
- Coordinates: 4°23′12″S 138°13′59″E
- Country: Indonesia
- Province: Highland Papua
- Regency: Nduga Regency
- District: Paro District

Government
  - Village Head: Septinus Melangen
- Elevation: 2,306 ft (703 m)
- Time zone: UTC+9 (Indonesia Eastern Standard Time)

Paro is a village located in Paro District, Nduga Regency, Highland Papua, Indonesia. The village is a site where Nduga hostage crisis took place.

== History ==
In 2011, Paro was separated from Mapenduma District and joined to a newly established Paro District.

On 7 February 2023, West Papua National Liberation Army (TPNPB) burned a Pilatus PC-6 (PK-BVY) operated by Susi Air at the airstrip and abducted the pilot. The Indonesian National Armed Forces captured the village and district from TPNPB hands on 13 February 2023. This incident led the residents to take refuge in Kenyam, Timika, and Wamena. As of 16 February 2023, the village was emptied.

== Education ==
The village has one public elementary school.

== Healthcare ==
There is one sub-health center in Paro. A community health center is planned and is currently under construction.

== Transport ==
Paro is served by an airstrip.

== Bibliography ==
- Statistics Indonesia (2020). Kecamatan Paro Dalam Angka 2020 (Report). Statistics Indonesia.
