= Paro, Nduga =

Paro
- District
- Interactive map of Paro
- Country: Indonesia
- Province: Highland Papua
- Regency: Nduga Regency

Government
  - District Head: Iday Lokbere

Area
  - Total: 868 km^{2} (335 sq mi)

Population (2020 Census)
  - Total: 2,751
  - Density: 3.17/km^{2} (8.21/sq mi)
- Time zone: UTC+9 (Indonesia Eastern Standard Time)

Paro is a district situated in Nduga Regency, Highland Papua. Paro is the district's capital.

== History ==
Formed in 2011, Paro District was separated from Mapenduma District. The district consisted of five villages. In 2023, the district was emptied due to the Nduga hostage crisis.

== Administrative territory ==
Paro District is divided into five villages:

- Animarem
- Loaraba
- Lombrik
- Paro
- Tawelma

== Education ==
There is only one public elementary school in the district and it is situated in Paro.

== Healthcare ==
The district only has one sub-health center in Paro.

== Bibliography ==
- Statistics Indonesia (2020). Kecamatan Paro Dalam Angka 2020 (Report). Statistics Indonesia.
