= Mapenduma =

Mapenduma may refer to:

- Mapenduma, a district in Nduga Regency, Papua province, Indonesia
  - Mapenduma hostage crisis in Mapenduma, Jayawijaya (1996)
