= Wirini =

- Village
- Location in Western New Guinea and Indonesia Wirini (Indonesia)
- Coordinates: 3°49′46.9092″S 138°24′47.4336″E
- Country: Indonesia
- Province: Highland Papua
- Regency: Lanny Jaya Regency
- District: Pirime District
- Elevation: 12,277 ft (3,742 m)

Population (2010)
  - Total: 855
- Time zone: UTC+9 (Indonesia Eastern Standard Time)

Wirini is a village in Pirime district, Lanny Jaya Regency in Highland Papua province, Indonesia. Its population is 855.

== Climate ==
Wirini has a wet tundra climate (ET) with heavy rainfall year-round.

Climate data for Wirini
Month	Jan	Feb	Mar	Apr	May	Jun	Jul	Aug	Sep	Oct	Nov	Dec	Year
Mean daily maximum °C (°F)	15.4 (59.7)	15.3 (59.5)	14.7 (58.5)	14.1 (57.4)	13.3 (55.9)	12.2 (54.0)	11.4 (52.5)	11.3 (52.3)	12.7 (54.9)	14.5 (58.1)	15.1 (59.2)	15.3 (59.5)	13.8 (56.8)
Daily mean °C (°F)	9.3 (48.7)	9.3 (48.7)	9.2 (48.6)	8.8 (47.8)	8.5 (47.3)	7.7 (45.9)	7.2 (45.0)	7.0 (44.6)	7.6 (45.7)	8.6 (47.5)	8.8 (47.8)	9.3 (48.7)	8.4 (47.2)
Mean daily minimum °C (°F)	3.3 (37.9)	3.4 (38.1)	3.8 (38.8)	3.6 (38.5)	3.7 (38.7)	3.3 (37.9)	3.1 (37.6)	2.7 (36.9)	2.5 (36.5)	2.7 (36.9)	2.5 (36.5)	3.3 (37.9)	3.2 (37.7)
Average precipitation mm (inches)	322 (12.7)	344 (13.5)	322 (12.7)	303 (11.9)	301 (11.9)	298 (11.7)	305 (12.0)	287 (11.3)	280 (11.0)	307 (12.1)	283 (11.1)	312 (12.3)	3,664 (144.2)
Source: Climate-Data.org
