= Atenius Murip =

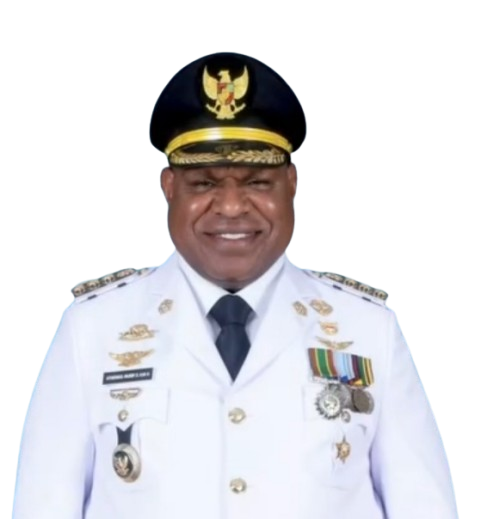

Regent of Jayawijaya
- Incumbent
- Assumed office 20 February 2025
- President: Prabowo Subianto
- Governor: John Tabo
- Deputy: Ronny Elopere
- Preceded by: Sumule Tumbo (acting)

Personal details
- Born: April 20, 1974 (age 52) Wamena, Jayawijaya
- Spouse: Idawati Waromi
- Education: 17 August 1945 University (S.H., M.H.)

Military service
- Allegiance: Indonesia
- Branch/service: Indonesian Army
- Years of service: 1995 – 2024
- Rank: Lieutenant colonel
- Unit: Army Aviation Corps
- Commands: Jayawijaya Military District; Flight C, 11th Army Strike Squadron

Atenius Murip (born 20 April 1974) is an Indonesian politician and retired aviation officer who is serving as the Regent of Jayawijaya since 2025. Previously, he served in the army, with his last office being the commander of the Jayawijaya Military District (2022-2024). He was the first indigenous Papuan to command the district.

== Early life and education ==
Murip was born on 20 April 1974 in Megapura, Wamena, the capital of Jayawijaya, as the son of Aren Murip, a priest, and Namlea Wetipo. Murip began his studies at a state-run elementary school in his village and graduated in 1989. He was then adopted by a soldier and was brought to Jayapura for holiday. Murip later remarked that he was so comfortable in Jayapura that his teacher later expelled him from the junior high school. Murip was then enrolled at a state junior high school in Sentani, Jayapura, and completed his education there in 1992. He later attended the Jayapura State High School and obtained his diploma in 1995. Raised in a religious household, Murip was accustomed to leadership roles from an early age, frequently leading Sunday school and youth church activities. He received his bachelor's and master's degree in law from the 17 August 1945 University in Semarang in 2006 and 2009, respectively.

== Military career ==
Murip's interest in a military career was influenced by his observations of military officers, whose discipline and composure contrasted with the more aggressive behavior he witnessed among some soldiers in Wamena. Despite initial reservations from his family, particularly his father, Murip pursued a career in the Indonesian Army after graduating from high school. Although he did not pass the selection for the National Military Academy, he succeeded in joining the elite Komando Pasukan Khusus (Kopassus) as a non-commissioned officer in 1995.

In 1996, Murip was among 3,000 Kopassus members who applied for flight training; only eight, including Murip, were selected. He completed his aviation training in Semarang and became a certified Army pilot in 1998. Advancement in rank required further education, leading him to complete additional training in 2003. He received a promotion to second lieutenant in 2004. Murip has since piloted various helicopters, including the Bell 205 A1 and Bell 412 EP and was appointed as the commander of Flight C under the 11th Strike Squadron of the Army Aviation Corps in Semarang in 2017. On August 17, 2017, during Indonesia's 72nd Independence Day celebrations, he piloted a Bell 412 helicopter over Jayapura, Papua, deploying 16 parachutists, including two Papuan soldiers, and transporting high-ranking officials such as the Governor of Papua, Lukas Enembe, and other provincial leaders. During his tenure, he was deployed into a number of domestic military operations, including in Aceh in 2005, Papua in 2008, East Kalimantan in 2013, and in Poso in 2018.

On 30 July 2022, Murip was appointed as the commander of the Jayawijaya Military District after briefly serving as the chief of airbases in the Army Aviation Corps. He became the first time a local Jayawijayan held this position. Upon his appointment, Atenius Murip outlined his vision to foster peace and unity in Jayawijaya and neighboring highland areas.

During his tenure, Murip was involved in resolving a civil unrest centered in the Sinakma area, which was triggered by the rapid spread of rumors alleging the kidnapping of an indigenous child. The unrest soon spiraled into widespread rioting, resulting in the burning of shops and kiosks, road blockades, attacks on vehicles, and, tragically, civilian casualties. Murip then deployed personnel from the military district to restore order, prevent further violence, and reassure the public.

== Regent of Jayawijaya ==
In 2024, Murip resigned from the army to run for the Regent of Jayawijaya, with Ronny Elopere as his running mate. He was supported by the Golkar Party, Gerindra Party, Democratic Party, and the Labour Party. Atenius emphasizes his commitment to Jayawijaya, predicting serious challenges ahead if local governance does not improve. He states that his decision to run is driven by a strong sense of duty to his hometown. He won the election with 109,945 votes, or 48.8% of the total vote. The incumbent Jhon Richard Banua, who competed in the election, attempted to dispute the results, but was rejected by the constitutional court. He was installed along with most other regional leaders elected in 2024 on 20 February 2025.
