= Kenyam =

- Location in Papua and Indonesia Kenyam (Indonesia)
- Coordinates: 4°36′5.3172″S 138°23′1.0644″E
- Country: Indonesia
- Province: Highland Papua
- Regency: Nduga Regency
- District: Kenyam District
- Elevation: 1,683 ft (513 m)

Population (mid 2022 estimate)
  - Total: 6,394
- Time zone: UTC+9 (Indonesia Eastern Standard Time)

Kenyam is a town and district in Nduga Regency, Highland Papua, Indonesia. It is the capital of the regency. Its population as at mid 2022 was 6,394.

== History ==
On 31 December 2015, President Joko Widodo, accompanied by First Lady Iriana, visited Kenyam, Nduga Regency, Papua Province, to review the construction of the road that will connect Nduga and Wamena. The trip of Widodo and First Lady Iriana and his entourage from Wamena to Kenyam, Nduga Regency was taken for 2 hours by changing transportation modes from Hercules VVIP A 1314 and Heli Super Puma TNI AU. On that occasion President Jokowi also stated that, in addition to building a road leading to Wamena, a large port at Mumugu (in Asmat Regency of South Papua Province) will also be opened and connected to the Nduga Regency. With the opening of this large port, the logistics and materials from and to Mumugu can be distributed using land routes that have penetrated all districts in Papua.

== Climate ==
Kenyam has a tropical rainforest climate (Af) with heavy rainfall year-round.

Climate data for Kenyam
Month	Jan	Feb	Mar	Apr	May	Jun	Jul	Aug	Sep	Oct	Nov	Dec	Year
Mean daily maximum °C (°F)	29.9 (85.8)	29.8 (85.6)	29.8 (85.6)	29.6 (85.3)	29.3 (84.7)	28.3 (82.9)	27.6 (81.7)	27.7 (81.9)	28.4 (83.1)	29.2 (84.6)	29.9 (85.8)	29.9 (85.8)	29.1 (84.4)
Daily mean °C (°F)	25.0 (77.0)	25.0 (77.0)	25.0 (77.0)	25.0 (77.0)	24.7 (76.5)	24.0 (75.2)	23.5 (74.3)	23.5 (74.3)	23.9 (75.0)	24.4 (75.9)	24.9 (76.8)	25.2 (77.4)	24.5 (76.1)
Mean daily minimum °C (°F)	20.2 (68.4)	20.2 (68.4)	20.3 (68.5)	20.4 (68.7)	20.2 (68.4)	19.8 (67.6)	19.4 (66.9)	19.4 (66.9)	19.4 (66.9)	19.7 (67.5)	20.0 (68.0)	20.5 (68.9)	20.0 (67.9)
Average precipitation mm (inches)	278 (10.9)	295 (11.6)	358 (14.1)	326 (12.8)	288 (11.3)	247 (9.7)	279 (11.0)	297 (11.7)	273 (10.7)	267 (10.5)	229 (9.0)	251 (9.9)	3,388 (133.2)
Source: Climate-Data.org
