= Yalimo Regency =

Regency in Highland Papua, Indonesia

Yalimo Regency Kabupaten Yalimo
- Regency
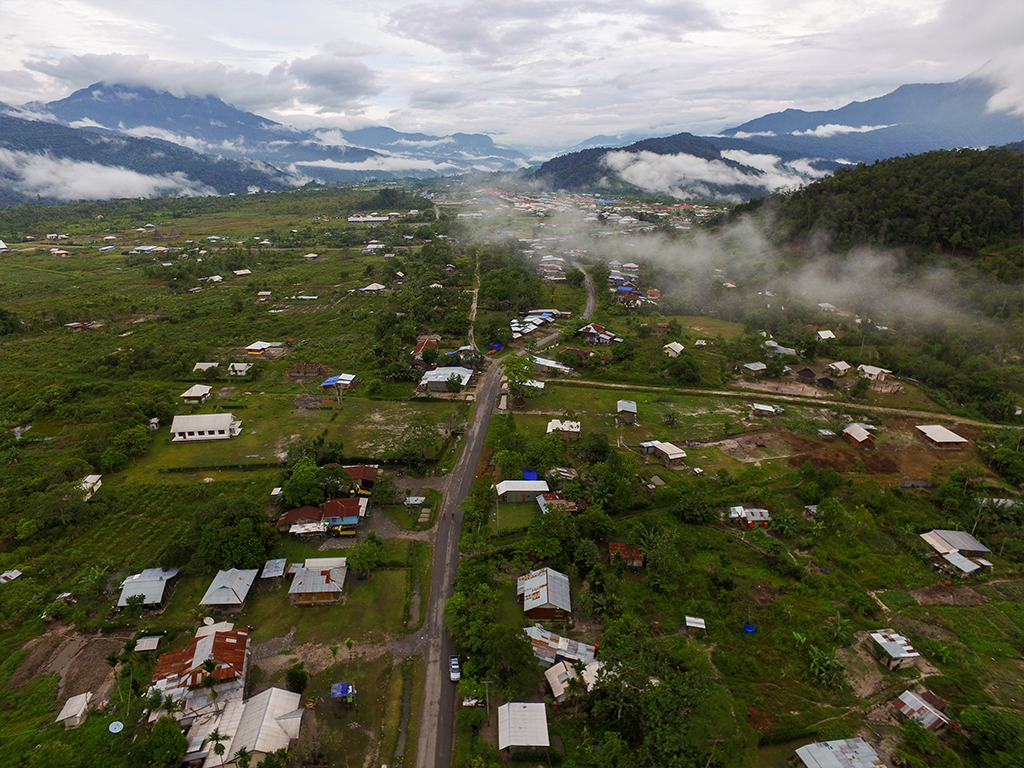
- Trans-Papua road on Elelim, capital of Yalimo

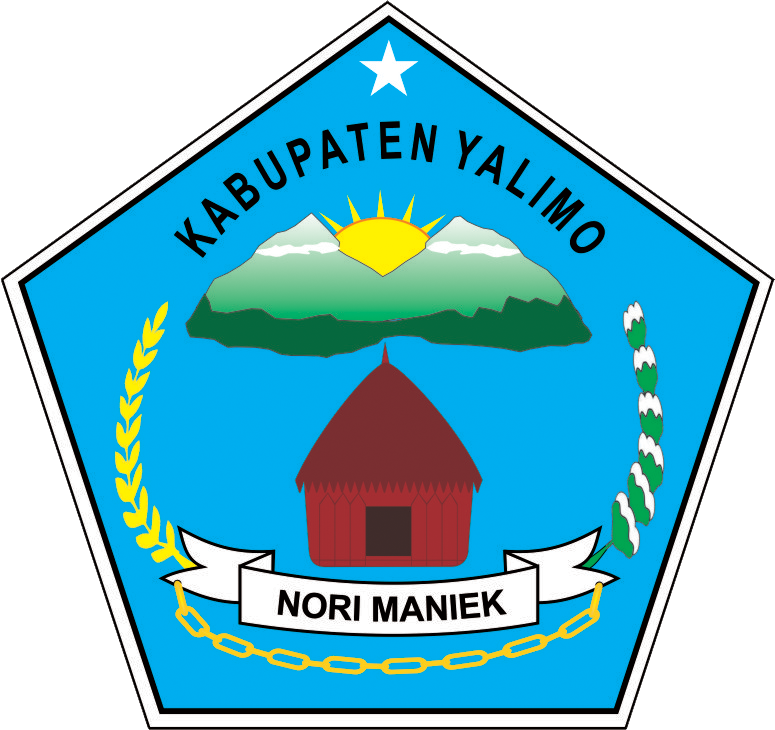
- Seal
- Motto: Nori Maniek
- Location in Highland Papua

- Location in Indonesian Papua Location in Indonesia Yalimo Regency (Indonesia)
- Coordinates: 3.785°S 139.447°E
- Country: Indonesia
- Province: Highland Papua
- Capital: Elelim

Government
  - Regent: Nahor Nekwek
  - Vice Regent: John W. Wilil

Area
  - Total: 4,330.29 km^{2} (1,671.93 sq mi)

Population (mid 2023 estimate)
  - Total: 106,740
  - Density: 24.650/km^{2} (63.842/sq mi)
- Area code: (+62) 971
- Website: www.yalimokab.go.id

Yalimo Regency is one of the regencies (Indonesian: Kabupaten Yalimo) in the Indonesian province of Highland Papua. It covers an area of 4,320.29 km^{2}, and had a population at the 2010 Census of 50,763 which doubled to reach 101,973 at the 2020 Census; the official estimate as of mid-2023 was 106,740 (comprising 56,520 males and 50,230 females). The administrative centre is at Elelim. The indigenous inhabitants of this well-forested mountainous area are the Yali people.

== Administrative districts ==
Yalimo Regency comprises five districts (distrik), tabulated below with their areas and their populations at the 2010 Census and the 2020 Census, together with the official estimates as of mid-2023. The table also includes the locations of the district administrative centres, the number of administrative villages (kampung) in each district, and its post code.

Kode Wilayah	Name of District (distrik)	Area in km^{2}	Pop'n 2010 census	Pop'n 2020 census	Pop'n mid 2022 estimate	Admin centre	No. of villages	Post code
95.06.05	Welarek	1,282.50	8,687	23,983	27,066	Welarek	61	99083
95.06.02	Apalapsili	383.32	5,840	16,046	18,084	Apalapsili	50	99084
95.06.03	Abenaho	1,131.81	24,577	33,963	31,353	Pasviley	108	99085
95.06.01	Elelim	660.76	5,946	15,544	17,267	Elelim	44	99082
95.06.04	Benawa	871.90	5,713	12,437	13,100	Gilika	37	99081
	Totals	4,330.29	50,763	101,973	106,870	Elelim	300	

At 108 kampung, Abenaho District has the largest number of villages among all the districts of Indonesia.

== Climate ==
Elelim, the seat of the regency has a tropical rainforest climate (Af) with heavy rainfall all year round.

Climate data for Elelim
Month	Jan	Feb	Mar	Apr	May	Jun	Jul	Aug	Sep	Oct	Nov	Dec	Year
Mean daily maximum °C (°F)	28.5 (83.3)	28.3 (82.9)	28.3 (82.9)	28.5 (83.3)	28.4 (83.1)	27.7 (81.9)	27.2 (81.0)	27.2 (81.0)	27.8 (82.0)	28.4 (83.1)	28.7 (83.7)	28.5 (83.3)	28.1 (82.6)
Daily mean °C (°F)	24.0 (75.2)	23.9 (75.0)	24.0 (75.2)	24.1 (75.4)	24.0 (75.2)	23.5 (74.3)	23.0 (73.4)	23.0 (73.4)	23.4 (74.1)	23.7 (74.7)	24.0 (75.2)	24.1 (75.4)	23.7 (74.7)
Mean daily minimum °C (°F)	19.5 (67.1)	19.5 (67.1)	19.7 (67.5)	19.7 (67.5)	19.6 (67.3)	19.3 (66.7)	18.9 (66.0)	18.9 (66.0)	19.0 (66.2)	19.1 (66.4)	19.3 (66.7)	19.7 (67.5)	19.3 (66.8)
Average rainfall mm (inches)	281 (11.1)	274 (10.8)	323 (12.7)	279 (11.0)	187 (7.4)	146 (5.7)	167 (6.6)	177 (7.0)	182 (7.2)	204 (8.0)	200 (7.9)	220 (8.7)	2,640 (104.1)
Source: Climate-Data.org
