= Nduga Regency =

Regency in Highland Papua, Indonesia

Nduga Regency Kabupaten Nduga
- Regency
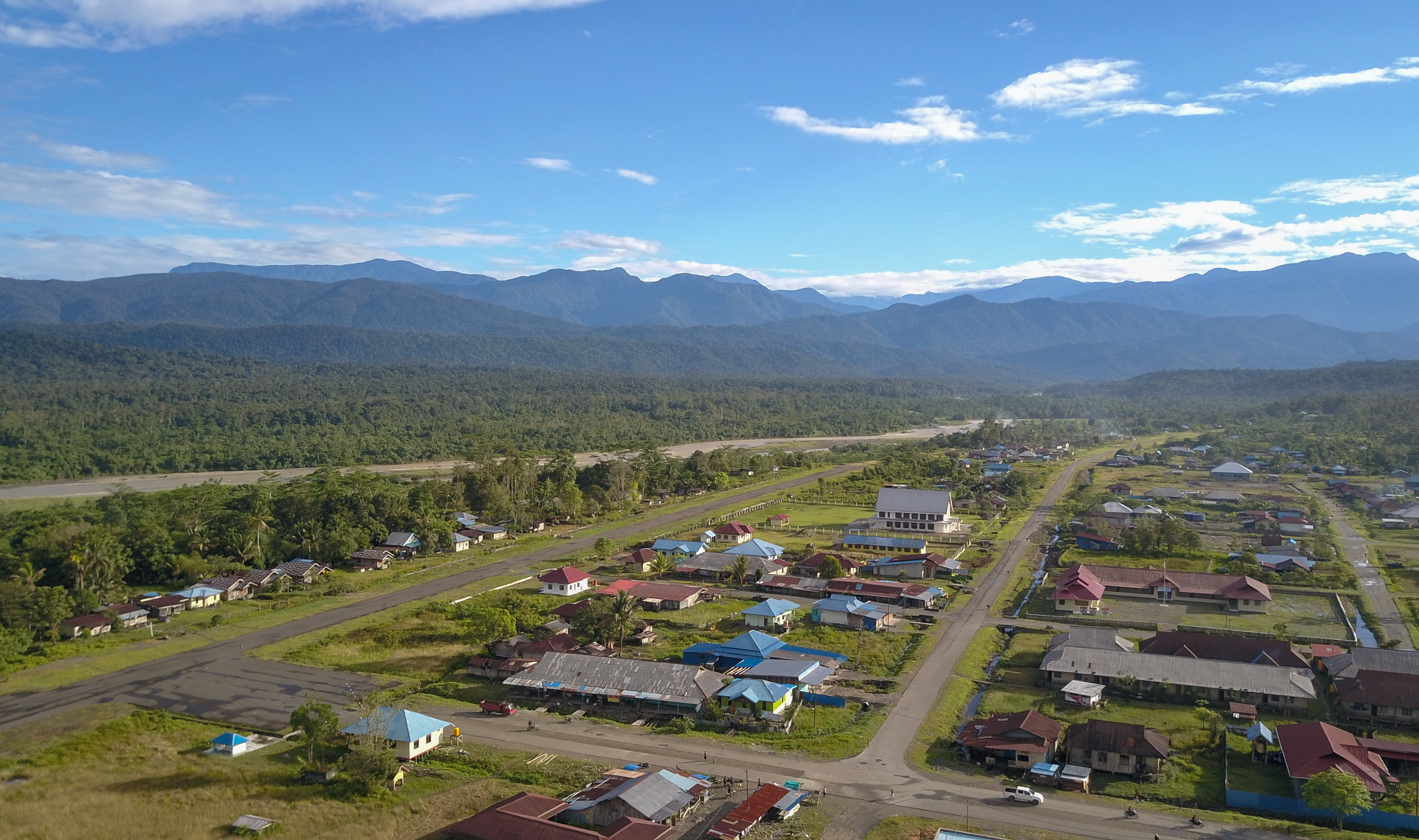
- Kenyam, capital of Nduga

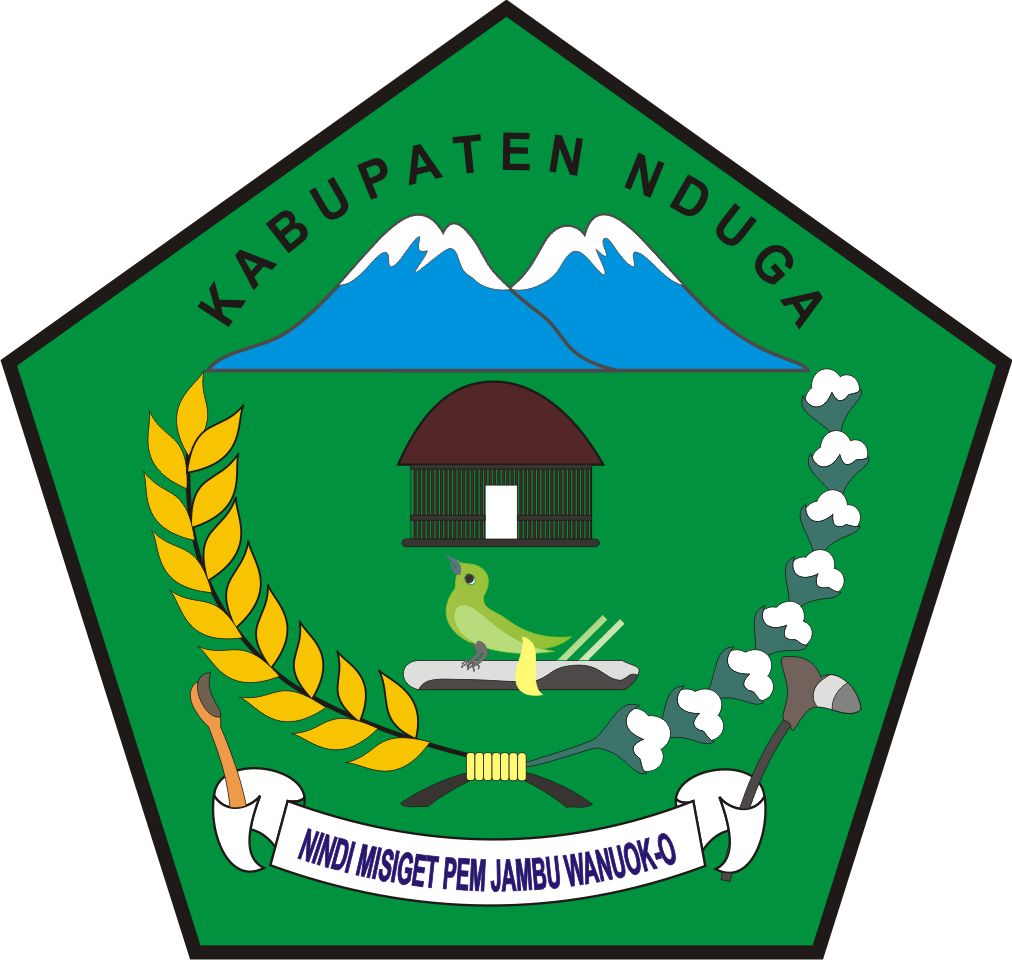
- Seal
- Motto: Nindi Misiget Pem Jambu Wanuok O
- Location in Highland Papua

- Location in Indonesian Papua Location in Indonesia
- Coordinates: 4.4509°S 138.1009°E
- Country: Indonesia
- Province: Highland Papua
- Capital: Kenyam

Government
  - Regent: Yoas Beon (acting)
  - Vice Regent: Vacant

Area
  - Total: 12,941 km^{2} (4,997 sq mi)

Population (mid 2024 estimate)
  - Total: 111,311
  - Density: 8.6014/km^{2} (22.278/sq mi)
- Time zone: UTC+9 (Indonesia Eastern Time)
- Area code: (+62) 967
- Website: www.ndugakab.go.id

Nduga Regency is one of the regencies (kabupaten) in the Indonesian province of Highland Papua. Nduga Regency was created on 4 January 2008 by separation from Jayawijaya Regency in accordance with Law No. 6/2008. It covers an area of 12,941 km^{2}, and had a population of 79,053 at the 2010 Census and 106,533 at the 2020 Census; the official estimate as of mid-2024 was 111,311. The administrative centre is at the town of Kenyam.

It has the lowest HDI out of all regencies and cities of Indonesia, with a score of 0.351.

== Administrative districts ==
In 2010 the Nduga Regency comprised eight districts (distrik), listed below with their areas and populations at the 2010 Census.

Name of District (distrik)	Area in km^{2}	Pop'n 2010 Census
Wosak	1,893	8,571
Kenyam	1,773	8,148
Geselma	2,903	8,098
Mapenduma	2,202	6,342
Mugi	684	9,266
Yigi	782	16,493
Mbuwa	937	11,234
Gearek	1,768	10,901

Since 2010, the number of districts has been raised to thirty-two by the splitting of existing districts. The revised 32 districts are tabulated below with their areas and their populations at the 2020 Census, together with the official estimates as of mid-2022. The table also includes the locations of the district administrative centres, the number of administrative villages (kampung) in each district, and its post code.

Kode Wilayah	Name of District (distrik)	Area in km^{2}	Pop'n 2020 Census	Pop'n mid 2022 estimate	Admin centre	No. of villages	Post code
95.08.04	Wosak	196	3,329	3,227	Pilini	5	99929
95.08.28	Moba	274	2,642	2,561	Moba	8	99926
95.08.27	Pija	153	1,520	1,473	Pija	5	99928
95.08.25	Kora	651	1,786	1,731	Kora	5	99923
95.08.01	Kenyam	223	5,946	6,394	Kenyam	9	99922
95.08.23	Mbua Tengah (Central Mbua)	323	3,556	3,824	Paris	9	99925
95.08.31	Krepkuri	1,518	2,714	2,918	Krepkuri	6	99924
95.08.24	Embetpem	334	2,858	3,073	Embetpem	5	99920
95.08.05	Geselma	220	4,220	4,521	Geselma	3	99903
95.08.14	Kilmid	377	2,617	2,804	Kilmid	4	99907
95.08.13	Yenggelo	432	2,111	2,262	Yenggelo	4	99918
95.08.15	Alama	3,797	1,816	1,945	Alama	4	99901
95.08.12	Meborok	394	3,933	4,213	Merorok	14	99912
95.08.02	Mapenduma	55	3,154	3,428	Mapenduma	10	99909
95.08.09	Koroptak	168	2,552	2,774	Kroptak	6	99908
95.08.11	Paro	868	2,751	2,991	Paro	5	99916
95.08.10	Kegayem	86	3,941	4,283	Kegayem	13	99906
95.08.06	Mugi	92	4,384	4,536	Mugi	18	99913
95.08.16	Yal	48	5,378	5,565	Yal	20	99942
95.08.17	Mam	106	4,291	4,440	Mam	14	99941
95.08.03	Yigi	87	4,568	4,361	Yigi	12	99919
95.08.18	Dal	88	3,538	3,377	Dal	6	99902
95.08.19	Nirkuri	189	3,645	3,479	Nirkuri	10	99915
95.08.20	Inikgal	51	3,848	3,673	Biripem	8	99904
95.08.07	Mbuwa	470	4,630	4,816	Mbuwa	6	99910
95.08.21	Iniye	301	4,611	4,796	Iniye	6	99905
95.08.29	Wutpaga	236	2,230	2,320	Wutpaga	6	99917
95.08.30	Nenggeangin	109	2,216	2,305	Nenggeangin	5	99914
95.08.22	Mbulmu Yalma	190	3,818	3,971	Uburu	7	99911
95.08.08	Gearek	200	4,259	4,066	Gearek	7	99921
95.08.32	Pasir Putih	437	1,720	1,642	Pasir Putih	4	99927
95.08.26	Wusi	268	1,950	1,861	Wusi	4	99930
	Totals	12,941	106,533	109,630	Kenyam	248	
