= Central Mamberamo Regency =

Regency in Highland Papua, Indonesia

Central Mamberamo Regency Kabupaten Mamberamo Tengah
- Regency
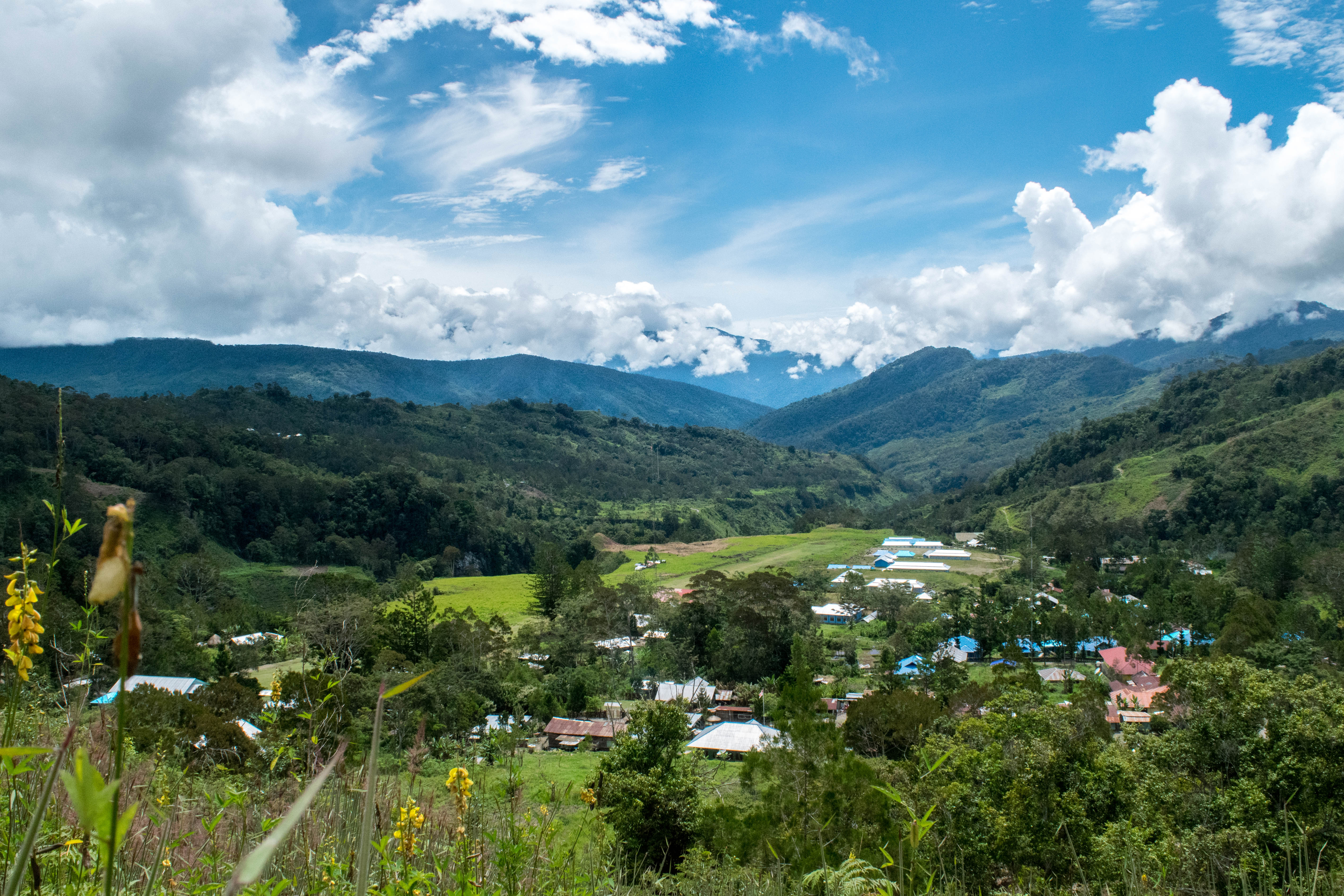
- Kelila district

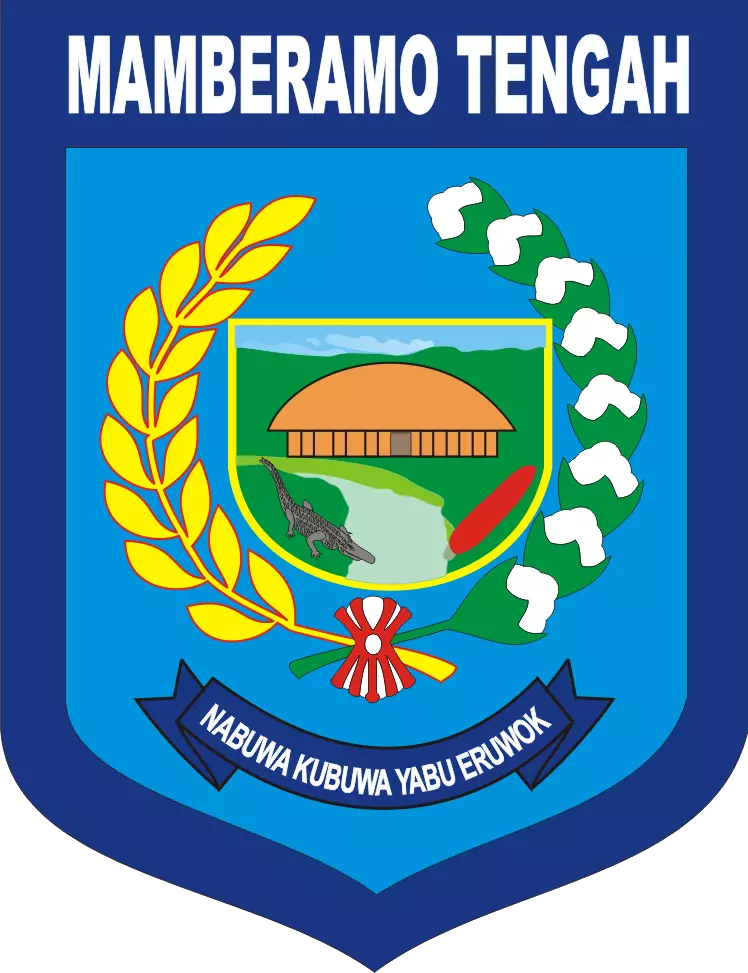
- Coat of arms
- Motto: Nabuwa Kubuwa Yabu Eruwok
- Location in Highland Papua

- Location in Indonesian Papua Location in Indonesia Central Mamberamo Regency (Indonesia)
- Coordinates: 3.664°S 139.065°E
- Country: Indonesia
- Province: Highland Papua
- Capital: Kobakma

Government
  - Regent: Yonas Kenelak
  - Vice Regent: Itaman Thago

Area
  - Total: 3,706.02 km^{2} (1,430.90 sq mi)

Population (mid 2025 estimate)
  - Total: 54,370
  - Density: 14.67/km^{2} (38.00/sq mi)
- Time zone: UTC+9 (Indonesia Eastern Time)
- Area code: (+62) 969
- Website: mamberamotengahkab.go.id

Central Mamberamo Regency (Indonesian: Kabupaten Mamberamo Tengah) is one of the regencies (kabupaten) in the Indonesian province of Highland Papua. It covers an area of 3,706.02 km^{2}, and had a population of 39,537 at the 2010 Census and 50,685 at the 2020 Census. The official estimate as of mid-2025 was 54,370. The administrative centre is at Kobakma.

== Administrative districts ==
Mamberamo Tengah Regency comprises five districts (distrik), tabulated below with their areas and their populations at the 2010 Census and the 2020 Census, together with the official estimate for mid 2023. The table also includes the locations of the district administrative centres, the number of administrative villages (kampung) in each district, and its postal code.

| Kode Wilayah | Name of District (distrik) | Area in km^{2} | Pop'n 2010 Census | Pop'n 2020 Census | Pop'n mid 2023 estimate | Admin centre | No. of villages | Post code |
|---|---|---|---|---|---|---|---|---|
| 95.05.01 | Kobakma | 645.20 | 18,418 | 13,504 | 12,687 | Kobakma | 15 | 99074 |
| 95.05.05 | Ilugwa | 66.11 | 2,160 | 13,855 | 15,582 | Ilugwa | 6 | 99073 |
| 95.05.02 | Kelila | 125.85 | 7,861 | 13,497 | 13,362 | Kelila | 19 | 99072 |
| 95.05.03 | Eragayam | 662.02 | 5,913 | 8,573 | 8,349 | Wurigelobar | 15 | 99071 |
| 95.05.04 | Megambilis | 2,206.84 | 5,185 | 1,256 | 1,180 | Taria | 4 | 99075 |
| | Totals | 3,706.02 | 39,537 | 50,685 | 51,160 | Kobagma | 59 | |

The sparsely populated Megambilis District, with over 59.5% of the regency's area but just 2.3% of its 2023 population, occupies the entire northern portion of the regency.
