= Tolikara Regency =

Regency in Highland Papua, Indonesia

Tolikara Regency Kabupaten Tolikara
- Regency
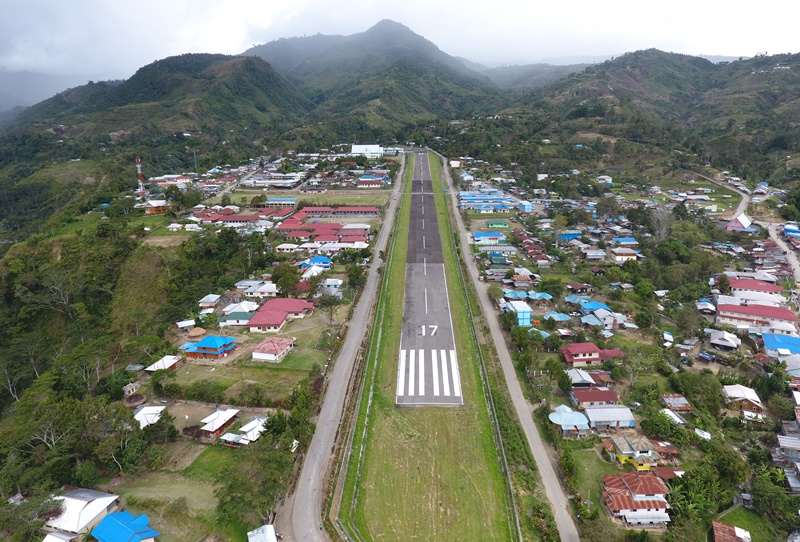
- Airstrip in Karubaga, the capital of Tolikara

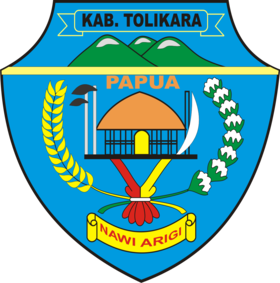
- Coat of arms
- Motto: Nawi Arigi
- Location in Highland Papua

- Location in Indonesian Papua Location in Indonesia
- Coordinates: 3.685°S 138.480°E
- Country: Indonesia
- Province: Highland Papua
- Capital: Karubaga

Government
  - Regent: Dinus Wanimbo
  - Vice Regent: Gamael Eldorando Enumbi

Area
  - Total: 14,564.0 km^{2} (5,623.2 sq mi)

Population (mid 2025 estimate)
  - Total: 248,310
  - Density: 17.050/km^{2} (44.158/sq mi)
- Time zone: UTC+9 (Indonesia Eastern Time)
- Area code: (+62) 969
- Website: www.tolikarakab.go.id

Tolikara Regency is one of the regencies (kabupaten) in the Indonesian province of Highland Papua. It covers an area of 14,564 km^{2}, and had a population of 114,427 at the 2010 Census and 239,543 at the 2020 Census; the official estimate as of mid-2025 was 248,310. The administrative centre of Tolikara Regency is the town of Karubaga.

== Administrative districts ==
Tolikara Regency in 2010 comprised 35 districts (distrik), but the number of districts was increased (by 2018) to 46, subdivided into 545 administrative villages. The districts are tabulated below with their areas and their populations at the 2010 Census and the 2020 Census, together with the official estimates as of mid-2022. Recent population growth has been concentrated in relatively few districts, with the majority of districts suffering population decline between 2020 and 2022. The table also includes the locations of the district administrative centres, the number of administrative villages in each district (totaling 541 rural kampung and 4 urban kelurahan), and its post code.

| Kode Wilayah | Name of District (distrik) | Area in km^{2} | Pop'n 2010 Census | Pop'n 2020 Census | Pop'n mid 2022 Estimate | Admin centre | No. of villages | Post code |
|---|---|---|---|---|---|---|---|---|
| 95.04.03 | Kanggime | 308 | 6,540 | 10,787 | 10,485 | Kanggime | 10 ^{(a)} | 99044 |
| 95.04.10 | Woniki | 368 | 7,385 | 4,513 | 4,032 | Wilileme | 10 | 99048 |
| 95.04.17 | Nabunage | 281 | 7,540 | 4,673 | 3,990 | Nabunage | 11 | 99045 |
| 95.04.18 | Gilubandu | 439 | 5,765 | 4,715 | 4,026 | Tinggom | 10 | 99043 |
| 95.04.33 | Wakuwo | 231 | 2,137 | 4,395 | 4,304 | Wonitu | 12 | 99047 |
| 95.04.42 | Aweku | 234 | ^{(b)} | 1,980 | 1,925 | Wuluk | 10 | 99041 |
| 95.04.43 | Bogonuk | 210 | ^{(b)} | 4,845 | 4,329 | Bononuk | 10 | 99042 |
| 95.04.01 | Karubaga | 312 | 6,703 | 16,411 | 19,074 | Karubaga | 23 ^{(a)} | 99027 |
| 95.04.05 | Goyage | 431 | 3,458 | 9,915 | 10,374 | Goyage | 19 | 99025 |
| 95.04.06 | Wunin | 225 | 3,705 | 5,920 | 6,156 | Wurineri | 9 | 99036 |
| 95.04.12 | Kondaga | 233 | 2,549 | 5,269 | 5,176 | Konda | 11 | 99028 |
| 95.04.13 | Nelawi | 245 | 3,257 | 7,452 | 8,336 | Nelawi | 12 | 99032 |
| 95.04.14 | Kuari | 445 | 6,703 | 7,906 | 6,956 | Kuari | 17 | 99029 |
| 95.04.44 | Li Anogomma | 252 | ^{(b)} | 4,521 | 5,256 | Lubuk | 10 | 99031 |
| 95.04.45 | Biuk | 215 | ^{(b)} | 5,710 | 6,387 | Biuk | 11 | 99023 |
| 95.04.02 | Bokondini | 433 | 4,942 | 6,000 | 5,344 | Bokondini | 11 ^{(a)} | 99012 |
| 95.04.15 | Bokoneri | 347 | 3,784 | 6,491 | 6,150 | Bokoneri | 17 | 99013 |
| 95.04.16 | Bewani | 583 | 3,824 | 4,230 | 3,667 | Bilubaga | 14 | 99011 |
| 95.04.04 | Kembu | 462 | 3,939 | 6,847 | 6,499 | Kembu | 11 ^{(a)} | 99056 |
| 95.04.07 | Wina | 435 | 3,200 | 5,329 | 5,020 | Wina | 13 | 99063 |
| 95.04.08 | Umagi | 375 | 3,182 | 7,082 | 7,057 | Umagi | 12 | 99061 |
| 95.04.09 | Panaga | 244 | 1,717 | 3,577 | 3,872 | Panaga | 9 | 99057 |
| 95.04.26 | Poganeri | 279 | 1,051 | 7,156 | 9,310 | Bogokila | 10 | 99058 |
| 95.04.27 | Kamboneri | 383 | 879 | 1,858 | 1,829 | Berembanak | 8 | 99015 |
| 95.04.28 | Airgaram | 425 | 3,051 | 4,544 | 4,182 | Onggokme | 8 | 99021 |
| 95.04.30 | Dow | 418 | 546 | 3,616 | 4,636 | Dow/Bijere | 11 | 99051 |
| 95.04.29 | Wari/Taiyeve II | 443 | 584 | 3,552 | 4,287 | Wari/Taiyeve | 17 | 99062 |
| 95.04.25 | Egiam | 467 | 270 | 3,282 | 4,537 | Egiam | 10 | 99053 |
| 95.04.19 | Nunggawi | 236 | 6,245 | 12,900 | 12,648 | Nunggawi | 26 | 99046 |
| 95.04.11 | Kubu | 233 | 3,093 | 3,515 | 3,071 | Kubu | 9 | 99030 |
| 95.04.36 | Anawi | 189 | ^{(b)} | 3,092 | 3,595 | Anawi | 10 | 99022 |
| 95.04.38 | Wugi | 192 | ^{(b)} | 4,089 | 4,754 | Wugi | 11 | 99035 |
| 95.04.24 | Geya | 342 | 2,891 | 5,601 | 5,461 | Geya | 12 | 99024 |
| 95.04.37 | Wenam | 231 | ^{(b)} | 4,992 | 5,804 | Banggeri | 10 | 99034 |
| 95.04.21 | Numba | 452 | 2,070 | 4,786 | 4,804 | Numba | 10 | 99033 |
| 95.04.41 | Kai | 221 | ^{(b)} | 4,069 | 4,231 | Kaiga | 10 | 99026 |
| 95.04.23 | Dundu | 403 | 1,613 | 3,622 | 3,620 | Dundu | 10 | 99052 |
| 95.04.20 | Gundagi | 397 | 3,727 | 4,617 | 4,108 | Woraga | 17 | 99055 |
| 95.04.22 | Timori | 454 | 3,206 | 3,597 | 3,140 | Bolubur | 12 | 99060 |
| 95.04.32 | Yuneri | 247 | 3,768 | 7,094 | 6,844 | Yuneri | 11 | 99037 |
| 95.04.40 | Tagime | 232 | ^{(b)} | 2,465 | 2,945 | Peyola | 10 | 99016 |
| 95.04.39 | Danime | 212 | ^{(b)} | 950 | 1,135 | Wania | 10 | 99014 |
| 95.04.46 | Yuko | 172 | ^{(b)} | 2,116 | 2,752 | Pekaleme | 11 | 99064 |
| 95.04.35 | Telenggeme | 219 | ^{(b)} | 3,352 | 3,6074 | Telenggeme | 10 | 99059 |
| 95.04.34 | Gika | 186 | ^{(b)} | 2,301 | 2,492 | Geka | 10 | 99054 |
| 95.04.31 | Tagineri | 223 | 921 | 1,789 | 2,138 | Tagi | 10 | 99017 |
| | Total | 14,564 | 114,427 | 239,543 | 244,345 | Karubaga | 545 | |

Notes: (a) including 1 kelurahan (in each case the district administrative centre, a town bearing the same name as the district of which it is the centre. (b) the 2010 population of the areas now forming these new districts are included in the figures for the districts from which they were subsequently cut out. Since 2010, the former districts of Dorman (which had 171 inhabitants in 2010) and Sbey (which had 111 inhabitants in 2010) have ceased to exist, while thirteen new districts have been created, which are: Aweku, Bogonuk, Li Anogomma, Biuk, Anawi, Wugi, Wenam, Kai, Tagime, Danime, Yuko, Telenggeme and Gika.

== History ==
The VI Asian-Pacific Astronomy Olympiad took place in Tolikara in November–December 2010.

The regency was the scene of a riot against Muslims during Eid prayer in 2015.

== Climate ==
Karubaga has a cool tropical rainforest climate (Af) with heavy rainfall year-round.

Climate data for Karubaga
| Month | Jan | Feb | Mar | Apr | May | Jun | Jul | Aug | Sep | Oct | Nov | Dec | Year |
|---|---|---|---|---|---|---|---|---|---|---|---|---|---|
| Mean daily maximum °C (°F) | 25.4 (77.7) | 25.2 (77.4) | 25.0 (77.0) | 25.0 (77.0) | 24.8 (76.6) | 24.0 (75.2) | 23.4 (74.1) | 23.4 (74.1) | 24.1 (75.4) | 25.1 (77.2) | 25.4 (77.7) | 25.3 (77.5) | 24.7 (76.4) |
| Daily mean °C (°F) | 19.8 (67.6) | 19.7 (67.5) | 19.8 (67.6) | 19.8 (67.6) | 19.7 (67.5) | 19.1 (66.4) | 18.7 (65.7) | 18.5 (65.3) | 18.9 (66.0) | 19.5 (67.1) | 19.7 (67.5) | 19.9 (67.8) | 19.4 (67.0) |
| Mean daily minimum °C (°F) | 14.3 (57.7) | 14.3 (57.7) | 14.6 (58.3) | 14.6 (58.3) | 14.6 (58.3) | 14.3 (57.7) | 14.0 (57.2) | 13.7 (56.7) | 13.7 (56.7) | 13.9 (57.0) | 14.0 (57.2) | 14.5 (58.1) | 14.2 (57.6) |
| Average rainfall mm (inches) | 278 (10.9) | 283 (11.1) | 320 (12.6) | 264 (10.4) | 205 (8.1) | 173 (6.8) | 175 (6.9) | 178 (7.0) | 185 (7.3) | 234 (9.2) | 217 (8.5) | 233 (9.2) | 2,745 (108) |
Source: Climate-Data.org
