= Lanny Jaya Regency =

Regency in Highland Papua, Indonesia

Lanny Jaya Regency Kabupaten Lanny Jaya
- Regency
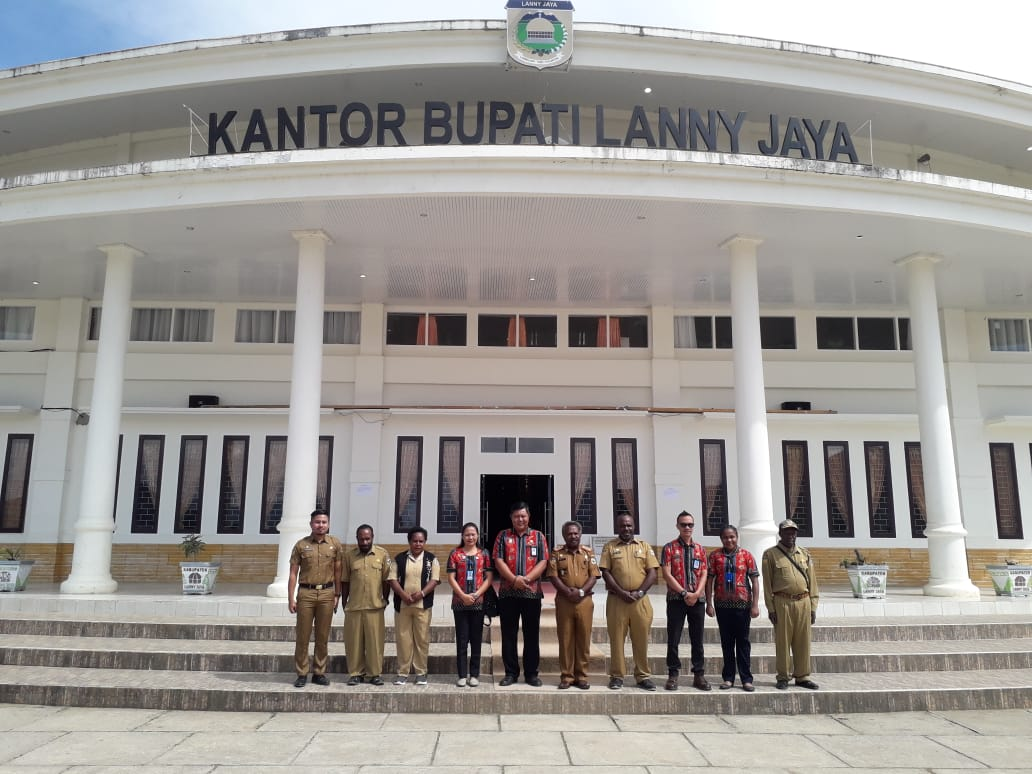
- Office Building of Lanny Jaya Regency

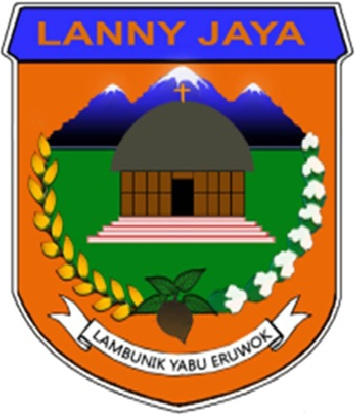
- Coat of arms
- Motto: Yambunik Labu Eruwok
- Location in Highland Papua

- Location in Indonesian Papua Location in Indonesia
- Coordinates: 3.9124°S 138.2877°E
- Country: Indonesia
- Province: Highland Papua
- Capital: Tiom

Government
  - Regent: Aletinus Yigibalom
  - Vice Regent: Fredi Ginia Tabuni

Area
  - Total: 6,077.4 km^{2} (2,346.5 sq mi)

Population (mid 2025 estimate)
  - Total: 211,330
  - Density: 34.773/km^{2} (90.062/sq mi)
- Time zone: UTC+9 (Indonesia Eastern Time)
- Area code: (+62) 969
- Website: lannyjayakab.go.id

Lanny Jaya Regency is a regency (kabupaten) located in the Indonesian province of Highland Papua. It covers an area of 6,077.4 km^{2}, and had a population of 148,522 at the 2010 Census and 196,399 at the 2020 Census; the official estimate as of mid-2025 was 211,330 (comprising 113,360 males and 97,460 females). The administrative centre is the town of Tiom.

== Administrative districts ==
In 2010 the Lanny Jaya Regency comprised ten districts (distrik), listed below with their areas and their populations at the 2010 Census, together with a list of the additional districts formed from parts of the original districts from 2013 onwards.

Name of District (distrik)	Area in km^{2}	Pop'n 2010 Census	Extra districts formed from 2013
Makki	309.81	23,306	Gupura, Kolawa, Gelok Beam, Awina and Kuly Lanny Districts
Pirime	677.72	20,125	Buguk Gona, Milimbo, Gollo and Wiringgambut Districts
Tiom	813.26	21,324	Nogi, Mokoni, Niname, Yiginua, Tion Ollo, Yugungwi and Lannyna Districts
Balingga	425.99	15,046	Balingga Barat, Bruwa, Ayumnati and Goa Balim Districts
Kuyawage	1,703.98	12,235	Wano Barat District
Malagaineri	1,258.62	5,472	Melagi District
Tiomneri	716.44	10,082	Wereka District
Dimba	290.45	14,500	Kelulome and Nikogwe Districts
Gamelia	174.27	14,680	Karu, Yiluk and Guna Districts
Poga	77.46	11,782	Muara District
Totals	6,448.00	148,522	

Since 2013, the number of districts has been raised to thirty-nine by the splitting of existing districts. These thirty-nine are listed below with their areas and their populations at the 2020 Census, and the official estimates as of mid-2022. The table also includes the location of the district administrative centres, the number of administrative villages in each district (totaling 354 rural kampung and 1 urban kelurahan - the latter being the town of Bokon in Tiom District), and its post code.

Kode Wilayah	Name of District (distrik)	Area in km^{2}	Pop'n Census 2020	Pop'n Estimate mid 2022	Admin centre	No. of villages	Post code
95.07.03	Makki	61.80	3,591	3,587	Kemiri	8	99565
95.07.27	Gupura	111.08	5,531	5,525	Lelam	12	99562
95.07.28	Kolawa	76.53	3,905	3,901	Ambena	10	99563
95.07.29	Gelok Beam	72.30	3,788	3,784	Pirambor	9	99561
95.07.21	Awina	121.18	4,583	4,578	Nambume	9	99572
95.07.30	Kuly Lanny	55.80	2,845	2,842	Indugu	8	99564
95.07.02	Pirime	137.00	5,855	5,951	Umbanume	8	99581
95.07.38	Buguk Gona	13.00	6,140	6,240	Kabiga	13	99574
95.07.18	Milimbo	249.13	5,184	5,269	Milimbo	8	99579
95.07.20	Gollo	373.69	4,317	4,387	Golopura	11	99576
95.07.19	Wiringgambut	249.12	4,526	4,600	Golo	10	99582
95.07.01	Tiom	281.10	10,369	10,908	Bokon	11	99593
95.07.12	Nogi	298.00	5,137	5,404	Yirene	8	99592
95.07.16	Mokoni	172.94	4,680	4,923	Mokoni	9	99590
95.07.11	Niname	205.30	3,884	4,086	Dugume	7	99591
95.07.13	Yiginua	205.30	4,058	4,268	Tepogi	7	99598
95.07.14	Tiom Ollo	285.50	5,081	5,336	Kumuluk	10	99594
95.07.15	Yugungwi	333.30	4,805	5,336	Konikme	9	99599
95.07.31	Lannyna	217.61	3,313	3,309	Bonom	11	99578
95.07.07	Balingga	94.70	4,289	4,469	Balingga	10	99583
95.07.26	Balingga Barat (West Balingga)	74.57	4,237	4,415	Tinggipura	8	99584
95.07.25	Bruwa	93.23	9,002	9,380	Bruyugu	9	99585
95.07.22	Ayumnati	238.32	4,605	4,799	Anitila	9	99573
95.07.24	Goa Balim	84.71	4,732	4,692	Wamitu	7	99586
95.07.09	Kuyawage	163.30	3,905	3,872	Wupaga	8	99587
95.07.23	Wano Barat (West Wano)	353.86	5,291	5,246	Wamiru	11	99596
95.07.06	Melagineri	90.80	5,434	6,259	Malagai	8	99589
95.07.39	Melagi	85.24	8,072	9,298	Wabiragi	8	99588
95.07.08	Tiomneri	135.30	5,139	5,396	Milinggame	9	99595
95.07.17	Wereka	145.95	5,215	5,476	Tabukeker	9	99597
95.07.05	Dimba	110.00	3,537	3,461	Dimba	8	99575
95.07.35	Kelulome	234.31	4,326	4,234	Kelulome	10	99577
95.07.36	Nikogwe	193.37	7,527	7,366	Wanggagome	9	99580
95.07.04	Gamelia	78.20	5,178	5,173	Wupi	8	99566
95.07.32	Karu	89.06	5,216	5,211	Ayafofa	8	99568
95.07.33	Yiluk	83.85	3,598	3,595	Odika	8	99571
95.07.34	Guna	69.02	3,377	3,374	Guna	7	99567
95.07.10	Poga	17.30	6,937	6,746	Poga	13	99570
95.07.37	Muara	68.59	5,190	5,047	Muara	10	99569
	Totals	6,077.40	196,399	201,461	Bokon	355	
