= Dani people =

Ethnic group of Western New Guinea

Dani
Hubula, Balim, Parim
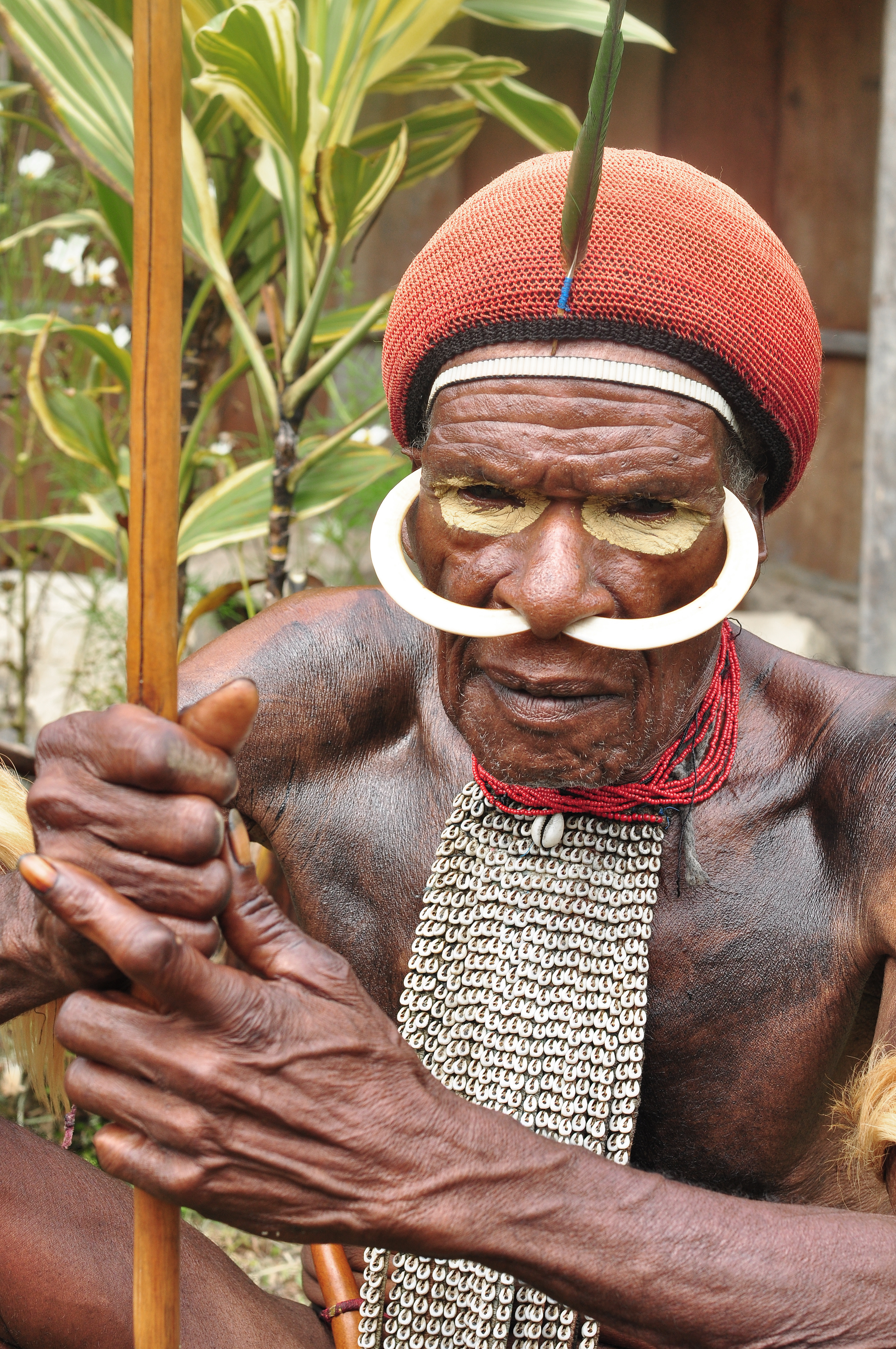
- A Dani man with custom accessories

Total population
- 90,000

Regions with significant populations
- Indonesia (Highland Papua)

Languages
- Grand Valley Dani, Indonesian language

Religion
- Christianity (85-90%) (especially Protestant), Animism (10-15%)

Related ethnic groups
- Hupla people, Lani people, Nduga people, Walak people, Wano people, Yali people

The Dani (also spelled Ndani) are an ethnic group from the Central Highlands of Western New Guinea in Baliem Valley, Highland Papua, Indonesia. Around 100,000 people live in the Baliem Valley, consisting of representatives of the Dani tribes in the lower and upper parts of the valley each 20,000 and 50,000 in the middle part (with a total of 90,000 people). The areas west of the Baliem Valley are inhabited by approx 180,000, representatives of the Lani people, incorrectly called "Western Dani". All inhabitants of Baliem Valley and the surrounding areas are often called Dani hence they are also sometimes conflated with other highland tribes such as Lani in the west; Walak in the north; Nduga, Mek, and Yali in the south and east.

They are one of the most populous tribes in the highlands and are found spread out through the highlands. The Dani are one of the best-known ethnic groups in Papua, due to the relatively numerous tourists who visit the Baliem Valley area where they predominate. Ndani meaning 'people of the east' is the name given to the Lani living east of the Moni, at the time misunderstood to refer to all inhabitants of the Baliem Valley, and while they call themselves Hubula (or Huwulra, Hugula, Hubla), they have been known as Dani since the 1926 Smithsonian Institution-Dutch Colonial Government expedition to New Guinea under Matthew Stirling who visited the Moni.

== Language ==
Linguists identify at least four sub-groupings of Dani languages or Baliem Valley languages:

- Wano language
- Nggem language
- Central Dani
  - Grand Valley Dani:
    - Lower-Grand Valley Dani (20,000 speakers) and Hupla language
    - Mid-Grand Valley Dani (50,000 speakers)
    - Upper-Grand Valley Dani (20,000 speakers)
  - Lani or Western Dani (180,000 speakers) and Walak language
- Ngalik language:
  - Nduga
  - Silimo
  - Yali (dialect cluster)

The Dani languages differentiate only two basic colours, mili for cool/dark shades such as blue, green, and black, and mola for warm/light colours such as red, yellow, and white. This trait makes it an interesting field of research for language psychologists, e.g. Eleanor Rosch, eager to know whether there is a link between the way of thought and language.

== First contact with Europeans ==
A small fringe group of the Dani (technically Nduga), living south of Puncak Trikora and presenting themselves as the Pesegem and the Horip tribes, were met on 29 October 1909, by the Second South New Guinea Expedition led by Hendrikus Albertus Lorentz, who stayed several nights in their village. First contact with the populous Western Dani (Lani) was made in October 1920 during the Central New Guinea Expedition, in which a group of explorers stayed for six months with them at their farms in the upper Swart River Valley (now Toli Valley, Tolikara Regency). The Grand Valley and its inhabitants, the true Dani (Hubula), was only sighted on 23 June 1938 from a PBY Catalina by Richard Archbold, who stumbled upon the valley while studying high-altitude vegetation in the Jayawijaya Mountains. By mid July, a camp was established by the expedition team near Habema lake (Yuginopa). Here they met with Dani (Hubula) from Pelebaga near Pele river.

== Culture ==
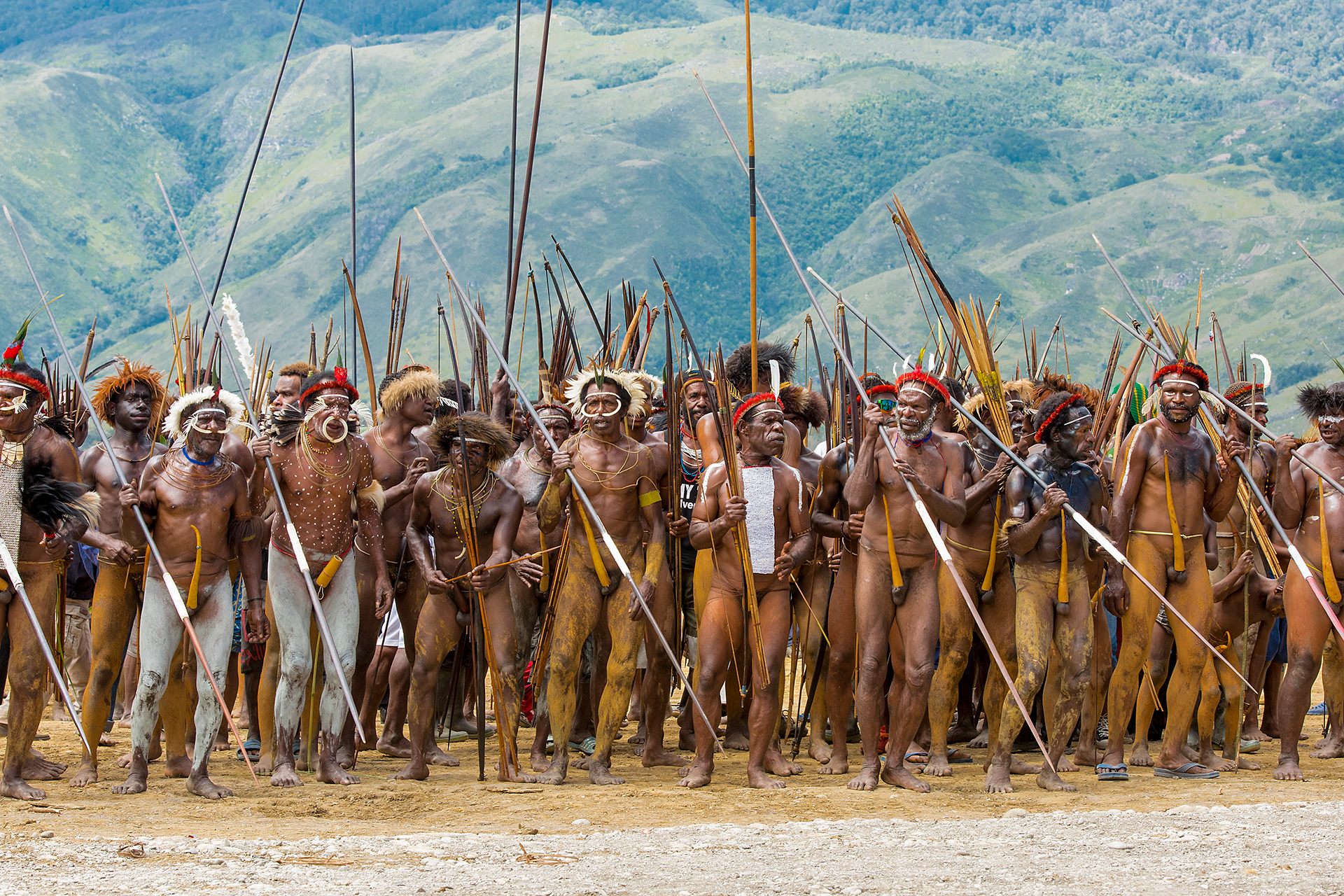
Dani warriors from the central highlands

1995 ABC news report on the impact of migration on Dani culture

Sweet potatoes are important in their local culture, being the most important tool used in bartering, especially in dowries. Likewise, pig feasts are extremely important to celebrate events communally; the success of a feast, and that of a village big man (man of influence) or organiser, is often gauged by the number of pigs slaughtered.

The Dani use an earth oven method (called bakar batu or barapen) to cook pigs and their staple crops such as sweet potato, banana, and cassava. They heat stones in a fire until they are extremely hot, and line a pit with some of them. Cuts of meat and pieces of sweet potato or banana are wrapped in banana leaves, the food packages are lowered into the pit, more hot stones are placed on top, and the pit is covered with grass and a cover to keep steam in. After a couple of hours, the food is ready to eat. Pigs are too valuable to be served regularly and are reserved for special occasions only. Ritual small-scale warfare between rival villages was an integral part of traditional Dani culture, with much time spent preparing weapons and treating resulting injuries. In 1966, there was a massacre in which 125 people were killed in an attack by an enemy clan. Typically the emphasis in battle is to insult the enemy and wound or kill token victims, as opposed to capturing territory or property or vanquishing the enemy village. Such fighting is no longer done.

== Ethnographic studies ==
In 1961, as a member of the Harvard-Peabody study, filmmaker Robert Gardner began recording the Dani of the Baliem River Valley, specifically in Kurulu District and Wita Waya District, Jayawijaya Regency. In 1965, he created the film Dead Birds from this experience. Gardner emphasizes the themes of death and people-as-birds in Dani culture. "Dead birds" or "dead men" are terms the Dani use for the weapons and ornaments taken from the enemy during battle (wim). These trophies are displayed during the two-day dance of victory (edai) after an enemy is killed.

== See also ==
- Indigenous people of New Guinea
