= Wano people =

Ethnic group in Indonesia

Wano
Wano Ap

Total population
- 7,000

Regions with significant populations
- Indonesia (Central Papua)

Languages
- Wano, Papuan Malay, and Indonesian

Religion
- Christianity (especially Protestantism)

Related ethnic groups
- Dani • Nggem • Walak

The Wano people (Wano: Wano Ap) are an ethnic group that inhabits the regencies of Puncak and Puncak Jaya in the province of Central Papua, Indonesia. The language they use is Wano language which belongs to Dani language family, so that anthropologists in the past called the Wano people as the Dani people.

== Etymology ==
The name "Wano" was originally a word used to refer to the name of the language and ethnic group, which comes from the interjection waa which can mean 'greeting' or 'salutation', such as "good morning", "see you", "sorry!", "thank you", etc. This greeting will also be replied with waa. Meanwhile, the word no is a particle (referential marker) which is used in sentences to explain the general context, different from the word ne which describes a more specific context. The word ap means 'people', so Wano Ap means 'Wano people'.

== History ==
In 1926, Matthew W. Stirling undertook an expedition to "penetrate the unknown territory of the Sudirman Range (Nassau) which is located to the north of the Central Mountains. Stirling himself managed to easily meet the Tapiro (Ekari), the Pesechem (Nduga), the Nogolo (Dani), the Ekari (Mee), and the Moni. He stated the existence of ethnic groups living in caves that he failed to find. According to researcher Willem Burung, although it cannot be confirmed, it is possible that Stirling meant the Wano people. This is because in the past, the Wano people lived in caves like in Mbowid village.

Comparing maps from the Nieuw Guinea Kaartmateriaal of the Topographic Service 1941, the location of the Explorer Bivouac is close to Wodegoduk village, while Bad-luck Bivouac with Dukibeci village, both are Wano villages. Bromley (1973) called Kimbin village the "Western Dani" area, even though it was also the original village of the Wano people.

In the 1960s, contact with missionaries began to develop where many Gospel and other manuscript materials were translated into various local languages, However, there is none for the Walak and Wano because they are considered sub-groups of the Dani. So the influence of the Dani and Moni languages is quite strong in the Wano language through education and church activities for the Wano people. It was not until around 1975 that Grace Cutts (the couple Bill and Grace Cutts were missionaries to the Moni people), with the help of Yahya Weya (a local Wano person) translating the primary material into the Wano language. Since 1980, the Indonesian government has carried out school standardization, which has led to the introduction of the use of the Indonesian and the Papuan Malay, although in 1995 there was still little school construction and facilities in the Wano area, so most had to attend school in nearby areas.

== Geographic distribution ==
Wano people (Western New Guinea)
The Wano people in the province of Central Papua, Indonesia

Biricare village, located in Fawi district, can be said to be the center point of the Wano people area. The eastern boundary lies between Kiagai village and Lumo village, which forms the southeastern boundary. The southern boundary is from Weiga village to Puduk village. The southwest boundary is east of the Jamo River (Tariku River). The westernmost boundary is Wodegoduk village, while the northwestern boundary is east of the Jamo River near the foot of the mountain near the Kendo-Kendo River to Dukibeci village. The northern boundary extends from Dukibeci village to the Mui River and Fawi village. The northeastern boundary extends from Nggweri village to Dagai village and Acodi village.

== Customary law ==
In Wano culture, Adom Wone is the name of customary law that covers marriage, farming, tribal/civil war, livestock raising, honai construction, and others.

=== Marriage ===
The Wano people recognize several forms of marriage, collectively known as aptawe-kwarawe dambubigwa, namely:

- Ideal marriage with the process of proposing (he hounto)
- A marriage in which a man is matched with a younger woman, who is then raised by the groom (piara)
- Elopement where the prospective partner is not approved by relatives (komi wogicenok wingkwa)

To choose a partner, one must not be a relative of the inombavi family, namely the children of the mother's mother, the father's or mother's family, clan endogamy or half of the people. Marriage with relatives (paby or incest) is prohibited because it is considered to bring a curse on the person and their descendants.

=== Social organization ===
The smallest structure is the clan, which is given territory depending on its social status to build settlements and live close to each other. One village usually consists of several clans. The Wano people traditionally live a semi-nomadic life, a newly cleared plot of land is called a yavuk, a plot of land under cultivation is called a yarak, a plot of land that is being harvested is called an akut, while land that is empty is called a wadik. Clans with noble blood, such as the clan fromnagwan, could choose the best territory. Although now this tradition is no longer practiced and anyone can choose it. The clan of the kugwi (shaman or suanggi) who practiced sorcery (irudik) had to live far away from the main settlement on a different hill across the river.

== Culture ==
=== Traditional clothing ===
The traditional clothing of the Wano people is the kevewok a covering made from a type of water gourd worn by men and a grass skirt made from reeds called mbuk. It was common for men to go to war and paint their faces and it was called mangga, derived from the tree where the fruit was used to give a brown/red color. The boar's tusk tid on the nose is pierced and the size of the tid indicates a person's bravery. Apart from that, they also carried weapons in the form of bows (egin), arrows (wim), stone axes (ye), and knives (yedowi). War leaders would also wear the feather decoration of the bird of paradise yawid on their heads.

=== Traditional house ===
House in the Wano language is awi, a Wano village is called anavawi. The kunyawi is a house/dormitory for young men to prepare for adulthood. In the middle is the main pillar (tiruk) between the fireplace (wunawi) symbolizing the feet or calf/soles of the grandfather (ninyombo ovok/acok) and treated with respect. In the kunyawi there is always firewood (kani) to keep the fire (indu) burning as a symbol of life. Meanwhile, the women's dormitory is called the kwenyawi although traditionally it is not as important as the kunyawi. Pigs (wom) and chickens (towewom) are now kept outside the house for reasons of hygiene, However, traditionally the pigsty (davo) is located under the house (awi).

== See also ==
- Ethnic groups in Indonesia
- Indigenous people of New Guinea
- Dani people
