= Yali people =

Ethnic group of the Highland Papua, Indonesia

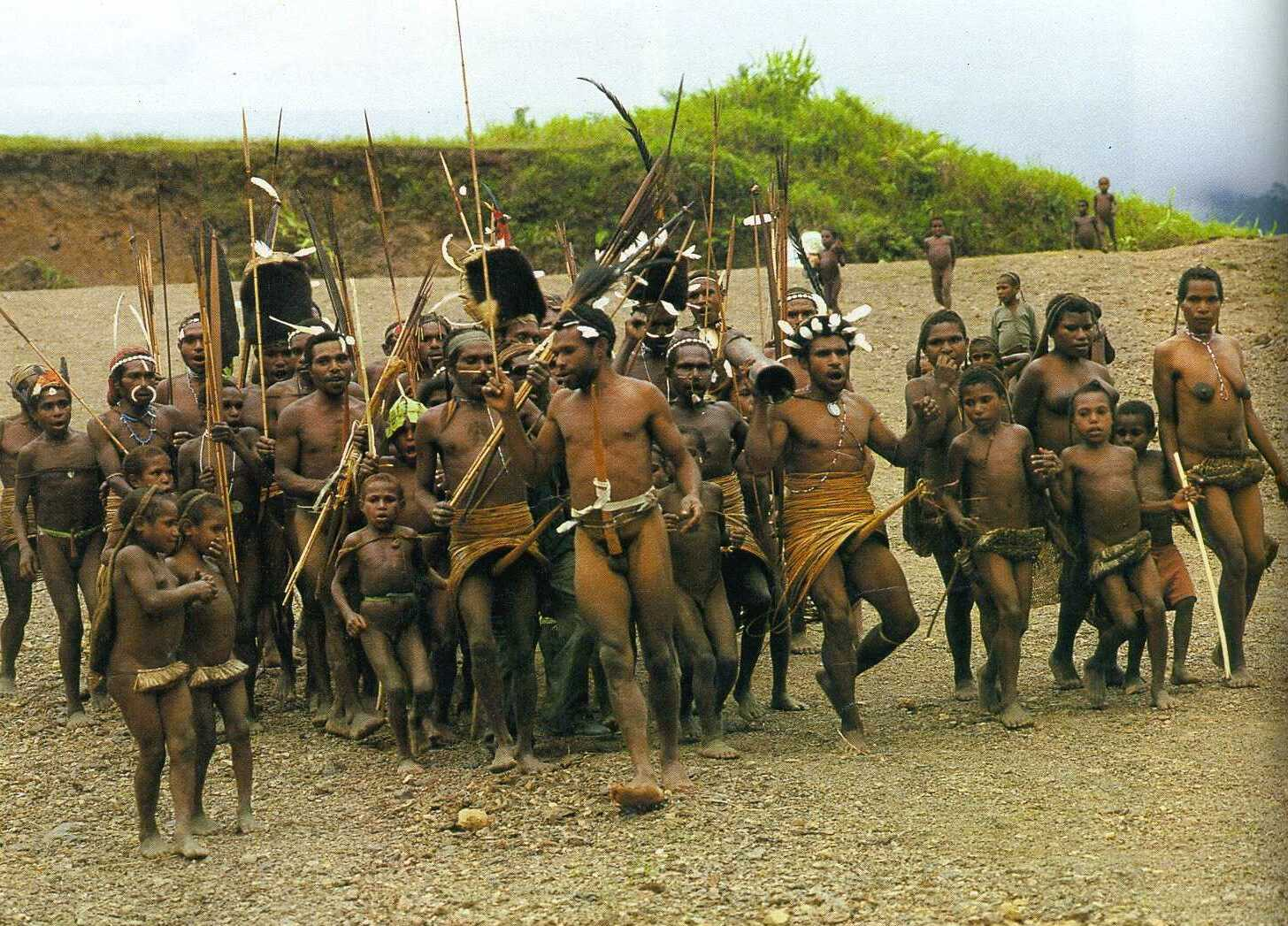
- Yali with traditional clothing, sabiyab and kem.

Total population
- 49,000 (2009)

Regions with significant populations
- Indonesia (Highland Papua)

Languages
- Yali or Mek languages, Indonesian language

Religion
- Protestant Christian & Catholicism (predominantly), Animism, Dynamism (metaphysics), Totemism

Related ethnic groups
- Dani people, Lani people, Nduga people, Mek people

Yali are a major tribal group in Highland Papua in Indonesia, and live to the east of the Baliem Valley, mainly in Yalimo Regency, Yahukimo Regency, and the surrounding regions.

== Etymology ==
The Yali and Dani word for "lands of the east" is yali, from where the Yali took it. When combined, the words ya (path/connecting staircases) and li (light) means "people from the place where the sun rises (East)." The -mu suffix is added to indicate 'place', the phrase O Yalimu refers to the Yali people's traditional region. Another origin for the name is its association with the mythical character Yeli, who was impervious to death even after being cut. Because humans, animals, trees, and other living things sprouted from his severed body parts, he was revered as the creator of the universe. Before disappearing in the west (Baliem Valley), he taught the Yali customs and asked to be worshipped. Gradually, his name's pronunciation changed to become Yali.

== Region and sub-tribes ==
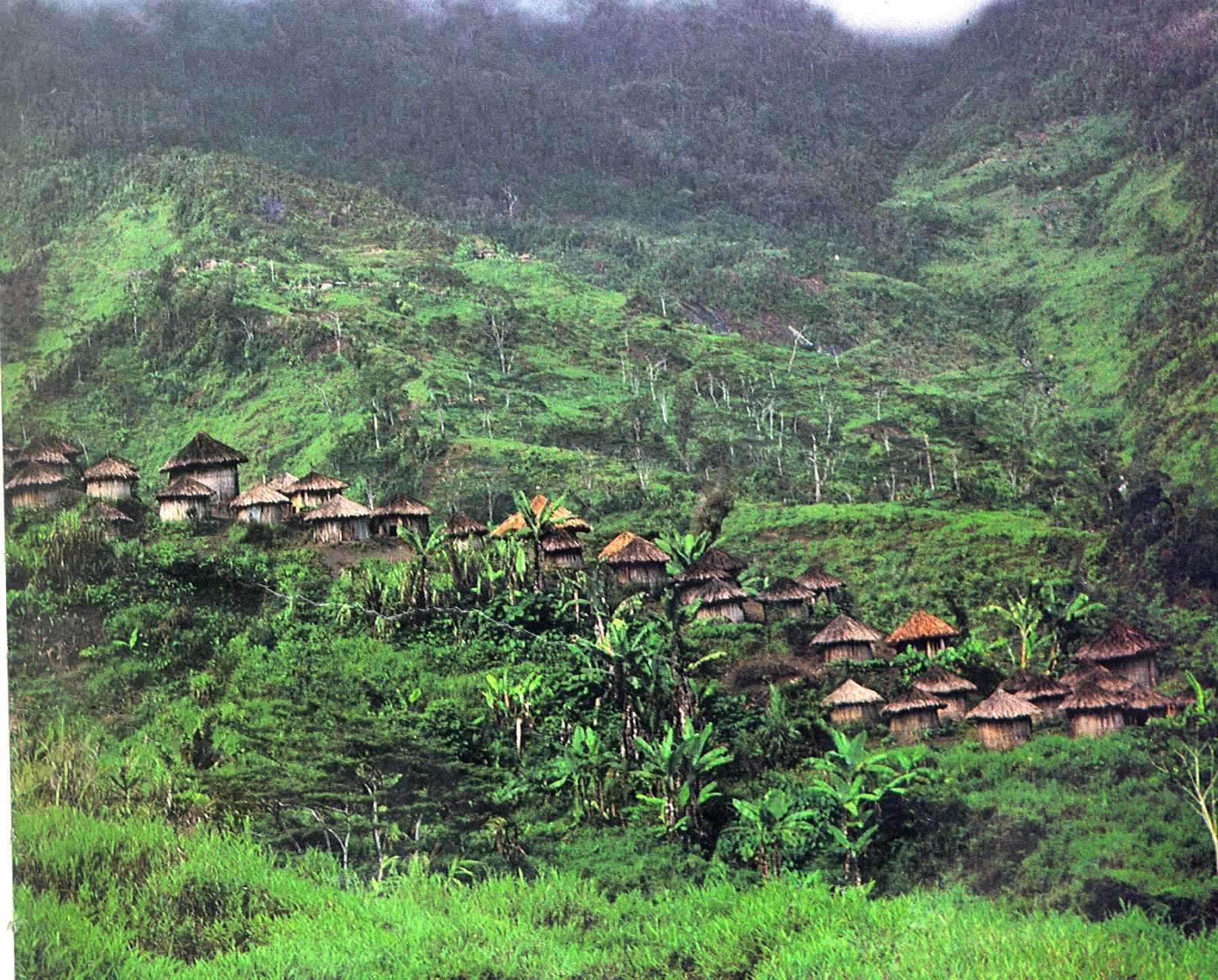
Traditional village of the Yali people, 2010.

In general, the Yali are split into two groups, Yali (mo) and Yali Mek, which live in Yalimo Regency and Yahukimo Regency, respectively. They also speak two different languages, the first one related to the Dani in the Ngalik-Nduga subfamily, the other one related to the Mek. They in turn are split into more sub-groups with their own dialects. The settlement territory of the Yali lies between the rivers Ubahak to the east and Sibi, Yahuli, and Podeng to the west. Their major settlements are Anggruk and Kosarek Districts, which are isolated by challenging geography. The major access to their territory is by air. The villages are only accessible by walking for several hours. These territories are collectively called Yalimu, sometimes spelled Yalimo.

- Yali
  - Yali in Yalimo
    - Yali Abenaho or Pass Valley (Yali)
    - Yali Apahapsili (Yali)
    - Yali Gilika (Mek)
  - Yali Mek in Yahukimo
    - Yali Anggruk (Yali)
    - Yali Ninia (Yali)
    - Yali Kosarek (Mek)

To the west of Yalimu lives the Hubula (Dani), and to the northwest, partially in the mountains, the Lani. To the north are the territories of the Kem and the Walak. To the east are the territories of other Mek groups and the Kimyal, while to the south are the territories of Momuna people. Accounts of the population size vary according to the source. In 1991, it was estimated to be 15,000 or 30,000. While according to the 2010 Indonesian census, the population was 133,812; however, this figure included Ngalik people.

== Culture ==
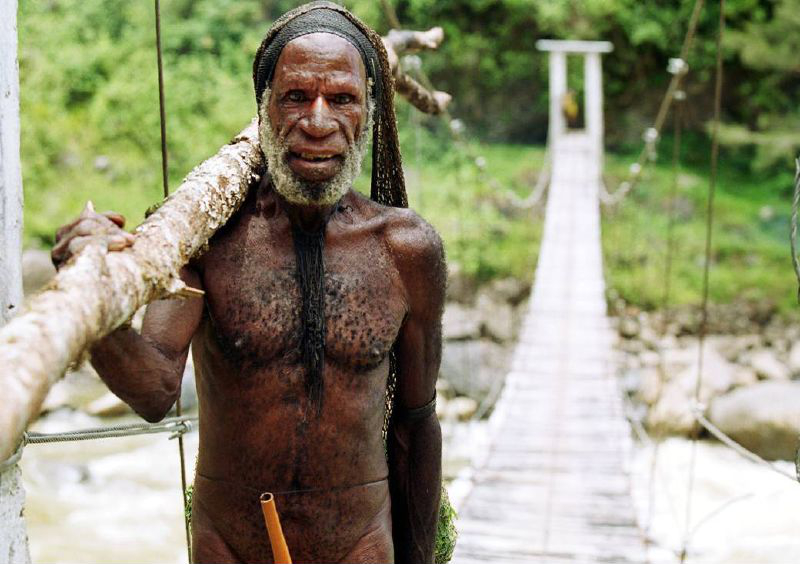
Yali man with humi from Pasema, Yahukimo

Traditionally the men are only clothed with a penis sheath (humi) and rattan rings around the waist. This combined attire is called sabiyab. More rattan rings indicate more prestige and bravery since rattan grew outside of Yali territory, hence was difficult to obtain. The rattan ring also functions as a fire starter. The humi of the Yali are long and thin made from dried bottle gourd, and secured with the rattan. Their heads are occasionally covered with hair nets, which have a pointed end at the neck. They are decorated with feathers and furs from cassowary, yalme, cuscus, while fur from sugarglider are used to decorate the tip of the penis gourds. The skin are painted with clay or charcoal, and boar tusks are fashioned to necklace or nose accessories. The women wear a short skirt made of reed called kem or kem lahuog. Their heads also carry noken called sum. However, T-shirts and trousers or skirts and blouses are becoming more common.

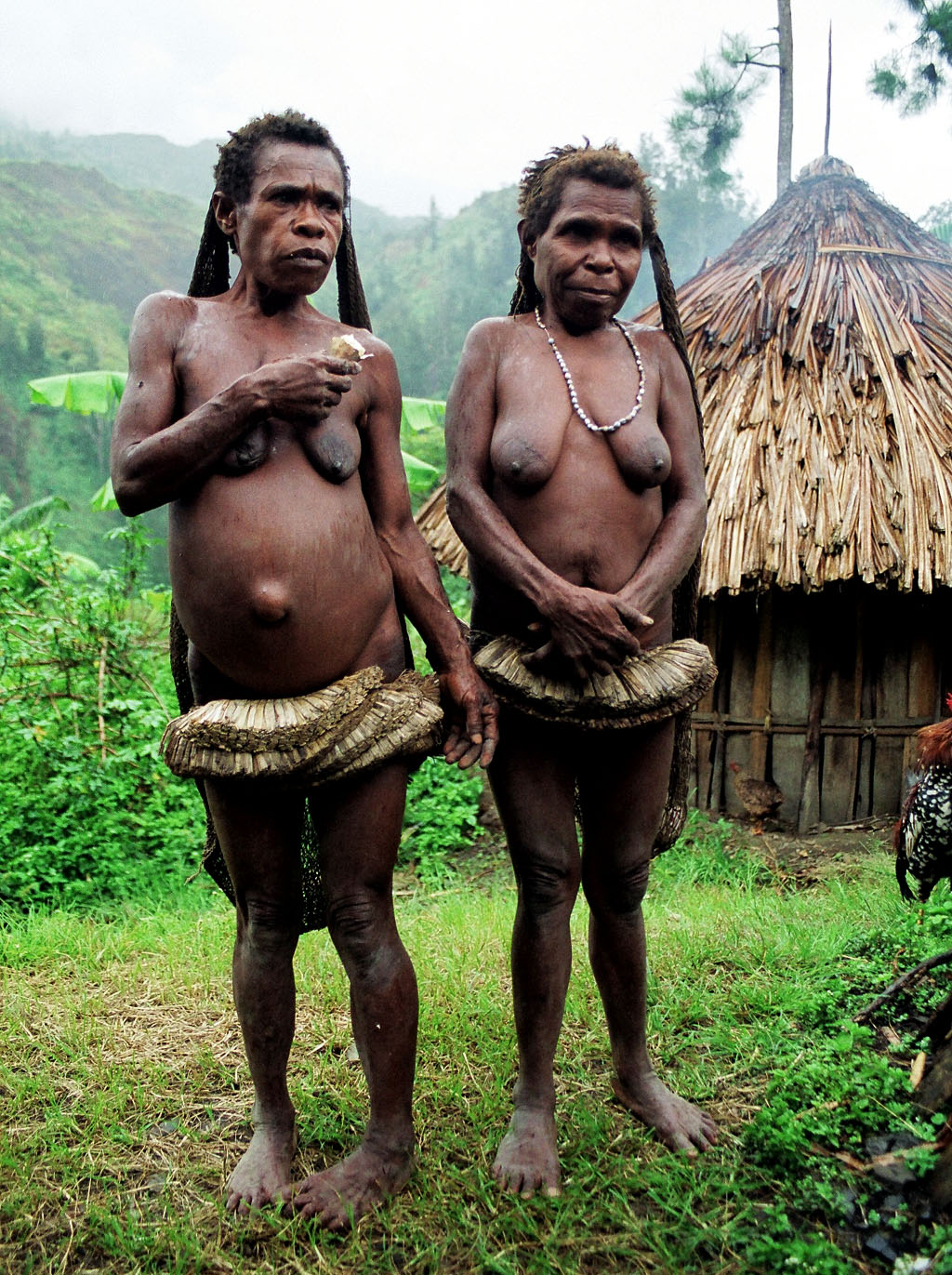
Yali women with kem, a traditional grass skirt

The Yali use sweet potatoes and taro as their staple foods, which are grown using shifting cultivation. Other food sources are hunting and gathering. For festivities such as weddings pigs are slaughtered, which are only being kept extensively. Fruits are not part of the common diet. In a patriarchal society, the men are responsible for building houses and hunting, while women grow and gather food.

Today the Yali are of Christian religion, mainly Protestant. Until the 1970s there were reports of cannibalism. The Christian missionaries stopped several feuds between villages; old war rituals and ancestor cults were forgotten. The Yali live in villages called opumbuk, which consists of yowi, hut for men, homea or homi, hut for women, wam ibam, pig house for livestocks, and a sacred house for boys and men rituals called usa yowi.

The Yali practices exogamous moieties, as they believed they were the descendant of two brothers, Winda and Waya. While in Anggruk and Ninia Districts, the brothers are called Kabak and Pahabol. All Yali clans belong to either one moiety, and marriage of clans inside a moiety group is strictly prohibited and considered incest (pabi). Punishment in the past would have been death, though after discouragement by Christian missionaries, the punishment for incest is more lenient. Clans in Yali are called unggul, and all members believed in one origin myth; they are then part of a larger unggul uwag. This larger group have multiple origin myths, though carrying the same clan names. Unggul uwag groups then joined together with another to form wilig lumpaleg; these are sometimes called confederations. Like the one of the Dani, the names of wilig lumpaleg are formed by combining the clan names. However, unlike the Dani, Yali confederations can be formed from clans from one moiety group. The even larger group is called ap ahe, as the clans have spread to many regions and may now belong to other tribes, like the Lani and the Dani, though they are still believed to be related and descend from one founder (ap ahe).

== See also ==
- Indigenous people of New Guinea
