= Yali =

Yali may refer to:

- Cyclone Yali (1987), a tropical cyclone that occurred during the 1986–87 South Pacific cyclone season
- Cyclone Yali, a tropical cyclone that occurred during the 1997–98 South Pacific cyclone season
- Yalı (residence), a water's edge house or mansion in Turkey
- Yali (mythology), a Hindu mythical creature with the body of a lion and some elephant features
- Yali (volcano), a Greek volcanic island
- Yali, Antioquia, a municipality in Colombia
- Yali people, a tribe of Western New Guinea
  - Yali language, a language spoken by the Yali people
- Yale-China Association, known as Yali in Chinese
  - Yali High School, Changsha, China
- El Yali, a Ramsar site in Chile
- Yali (politician), a New Guinean religious leader, politician and cargo cult leader.
- YALI (Linux) (Yet Another Linux Installer), an installer used for installing some Linux distributions, like Pardus.
- Yali Falls Dam
- Young African Leaders Initiative Leadership initiative of the United States Department of State.
