= Nduga =

Nduga may refer to:

- Nduga language of Western New Guinea
- Nduga people of Highland Papua, Indonesia
- Nduga Regency of Highland Papua, Indonesia
  - Nduga massacre, 2018
  - Nduga hostage crisis, 2023
- Ben Nduga, Ugandan sprinter
