= Nduga people =

Nduga People
Ndugwa, Dauwa, Dawa, Pesekhem, Pesegem
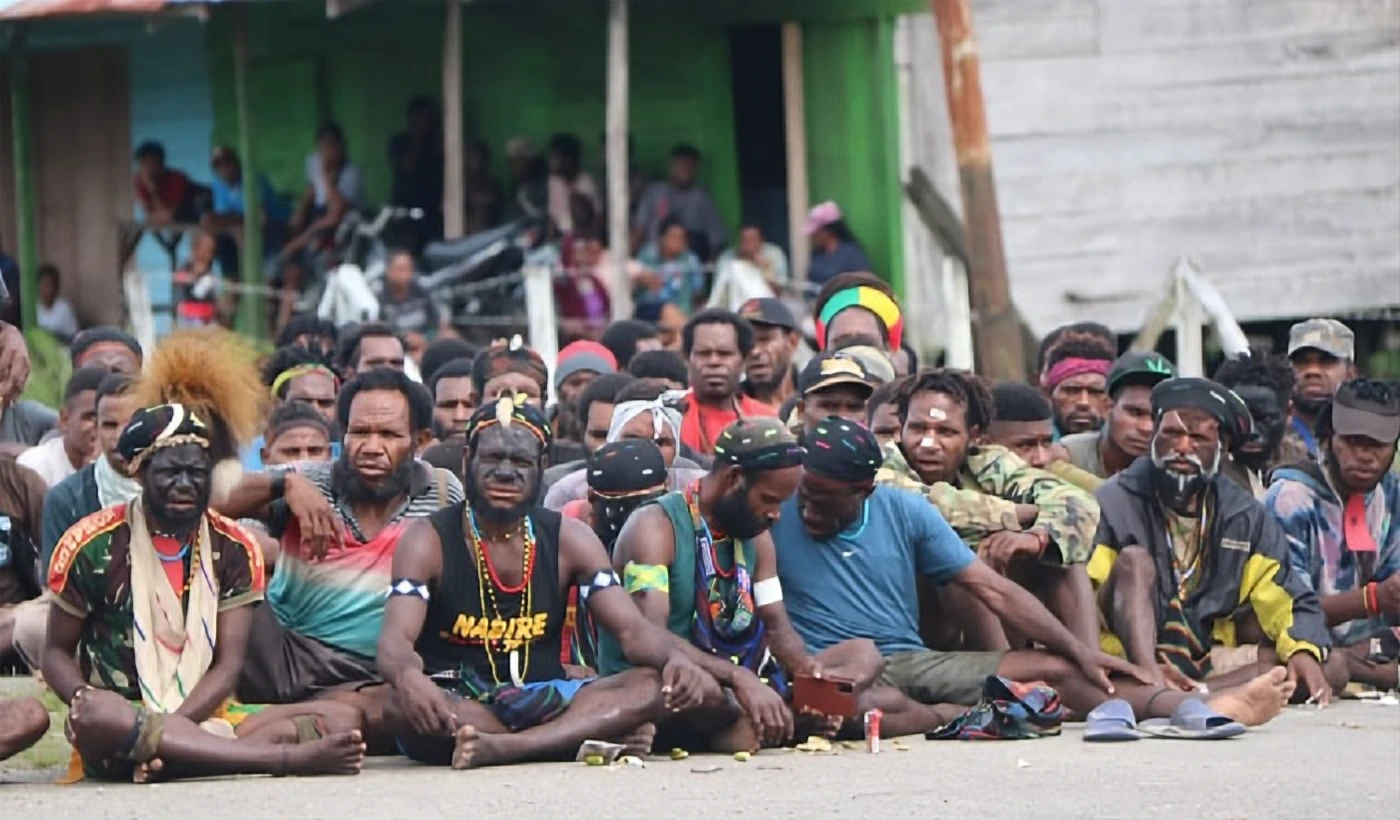
- Nduga people in Kenyam

Total population
- 96,928 (2010)

Regions with significant populations
- Indonesia (Central Papua, South Papua, dan Highland Papua)

Languages
- Nduga, Indonesian

Related ethnic groups
- Ngalik • Dani • Lani

The Nduga people are an Indigenous ethnic group in the Central Highlands region of southern Papua, particularly in the Nduga Regency and surrounding areas. The territory of the Nduga people borders the Dani and Lani to the north, the Asmat to the south, the Damal to the west, and the Ngalik to the east.

The Nduga tribe is divided into two groups: the Nduga tribe in the hot areas (lowlands), such as in Mapenduma, Central Mbua up to Kora-Lower, Wosak-Lower, Kenyam, Geselma, Wandud, and Alama. The second group consists of the Nduga tribe living in cold areas (highlands), such as in Yigi, Upper Mbuwa, Iniye, Upper Wosak, and Upper Kora.

== Etymology ==
The name "Nduga" derives from a variation of the pronunciation of the word ndawa, which means people who live off hunting between the stone holes in the southern region of the Jayawijaya Mountains.

== History ==
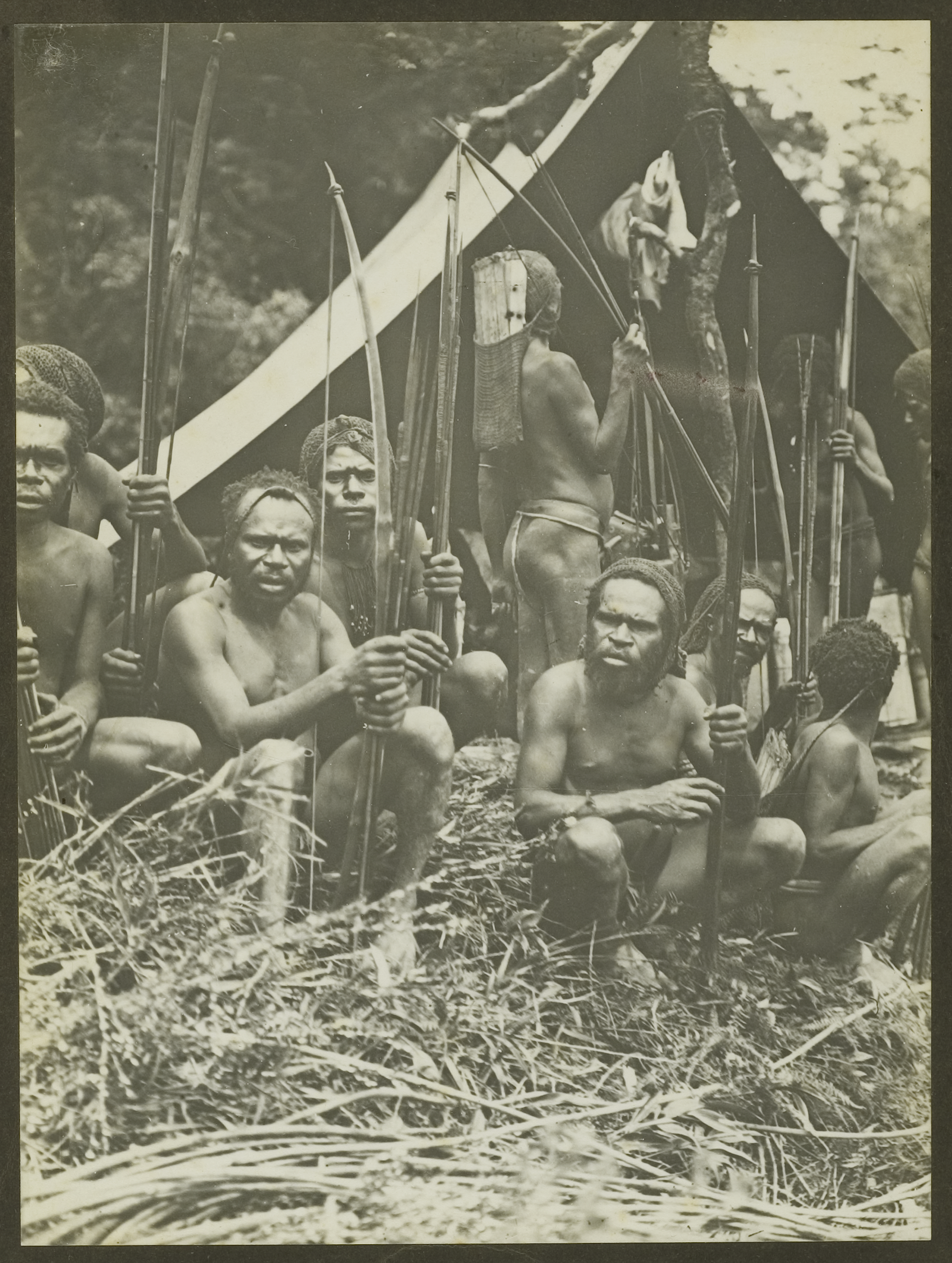
Pesegem people during the Third Southern New Guinea Expedition, 1912–1913.

The Nduga tribe believes that their ancestors were from the Seinma region in Yahukimo Regency and later they migrated to the Baliem Valley. Many explorations were conducted in highland Papua during the early 20th century. One of these was the Second South New Guinea Expedition led by Lorentz and composed of the Kamoro and Apo Kayan Dayak tribes in 1909–1910, which successfully met with representatives from the Pesegem tribesman in the south of Mount Trikora, although they failed to reach the Baliem Valley. The third expedition in 1912–1913, led by Herderschee, also managed to contact the Pesegem again. Pesegem is a Nduga-speaking group considered to be part of the Dani at the time. Additionally, the expedition team also encountered the Morup group, though they were not studied further.

According to a Nduga community leader, when World War II occurred in the 1940s, the Nduga people had already migrated to Tsinga and Alama. There was then a migration back to Agimuga in the 1950s because the Dutch opened this area for agriculture and coffee plantations due to the cold climate in Tsinga and Alama. In the 1960s, the Dutch government opened up the Kokonau, leading to another Nduga migration, albeit only reaching Mapuru Jaya before stopping at Kwamki. The Ndugas became more widely known through evangelization missions by the Zending C&MA (Christian and Missionary Alliance) in 1963, which was led by a Sumatran-born Dutch-American missionary, Rev. Adriaan Van Der Bijl. At first, he served in Enarotali. Then, at the C&MA conference in Jayapura, he decided to serve in the Nduga region. From Hitadipa he went to Jila by plane, then continued on foot to the Nduga territory in Mapenduma. As a token of appreciation, he was known by the name Ndugamende, meaning "this missionary belongs to us, the Ndugas," while his second wife, Elfrieda Toews, was known as Ndugakwe, meaning "Nduga woman."

== Language ==
The Nduga tribe has its own language called Nduga Language, a member of the Ngalik-Nduga in the Baliem Valley or Dani language family. On its cultural language map, the Ministry of Education called this language Kenyam Niknene. Some sub-groups of the Nduga tribe can speak surrounding languages apart from Nduga, such as Lani Nduga, who can speak Lani; Amung-Tau who can speak Amung-kal; Nduga-Loremeye who can speak Moni; and Nduga-Nayak who can speak Dani. The Nduga language has several dialects, estimated to be over ten based on their locations, such as Hiburzt, Tundu, Tumbut, Suburu, Mapenduma, Mbua, Kenyam, etc.

== Customs ==
=== Kinship ===
The Nduga tribe practices exogamous moieties, where the Nduga tribe is divided into two moieties: Gwijangge and Wandikbo, and married couples must belong to different moieties. Under those moieties, there are clans such as Kelnea, Tabuni, Nirigi, Nimiangge, and Pokneangge belonging to the Wandikbo moiety, while Lokbere, Murip, Bugiangge, Mbetmbere, and Debengen belong to the Gwijangge moiety.

=== Marriage ===
The Nduga people have four different kinds of marriage:

- agreed marriage (kwemin apmin indimsigat)
- marriage without parental consent (kwembalukbriknak)
- a marriage arranged by the parents of both parties (itja nen lidludtakpidnak)
- marriage as a result of witchcraft (nggawusawaniknakwee)

Nduga people also believe in aphrodisiac leaves to enchant a partner, which are kulalok, nabisinggi, and kwelbe leaves found in Puncak Trikora. The traditional dowries of the Nduga are pigs (wam), 3-5 strings of cowrie shells (ijebasik), 1-2 large shells (tol), 2-5 stone axes (wanggokme), and 1-2 plates of tobacco (ebekanem).

=== Social Structure ===
A housing complex consisting of several kince houses (traditional Nduga houses for men) or family clans in the Nduga tribe is called osiri, which is led by a tribal chief or big/rich man called ap noe or ap ngak/nggok and a warlord called wimbo or ndugure. Ap nggak cannot be replaced, and if he is a bad leader, the community will not obey him. Ap nggak is the leader of the war and organizes the coronation ceremony (liwitmbaruge). Meanwhile, wimbo selects the soldiers, whereas kwalembo presides over traditional ceremonies related to healing and the opening of new gardens or harvest ceremonies. At harvest ceremonies, the kwalembo utters sacred words (wusama) to bless noken bags full of yams. Ndugure is the Nduga term for the main actors in a conflict, either the perpetrator who caused the problem and initiated the conflict or the victims who wanted revenge by initiating fighting. So ndugure will be appointed the person responsible for which the warlords conducted war; he will be responsible for demanding and paying customary punishment.

== Notable people ==
- Iqbal Gwijangge, Indonesian footballer

== Gallery ==
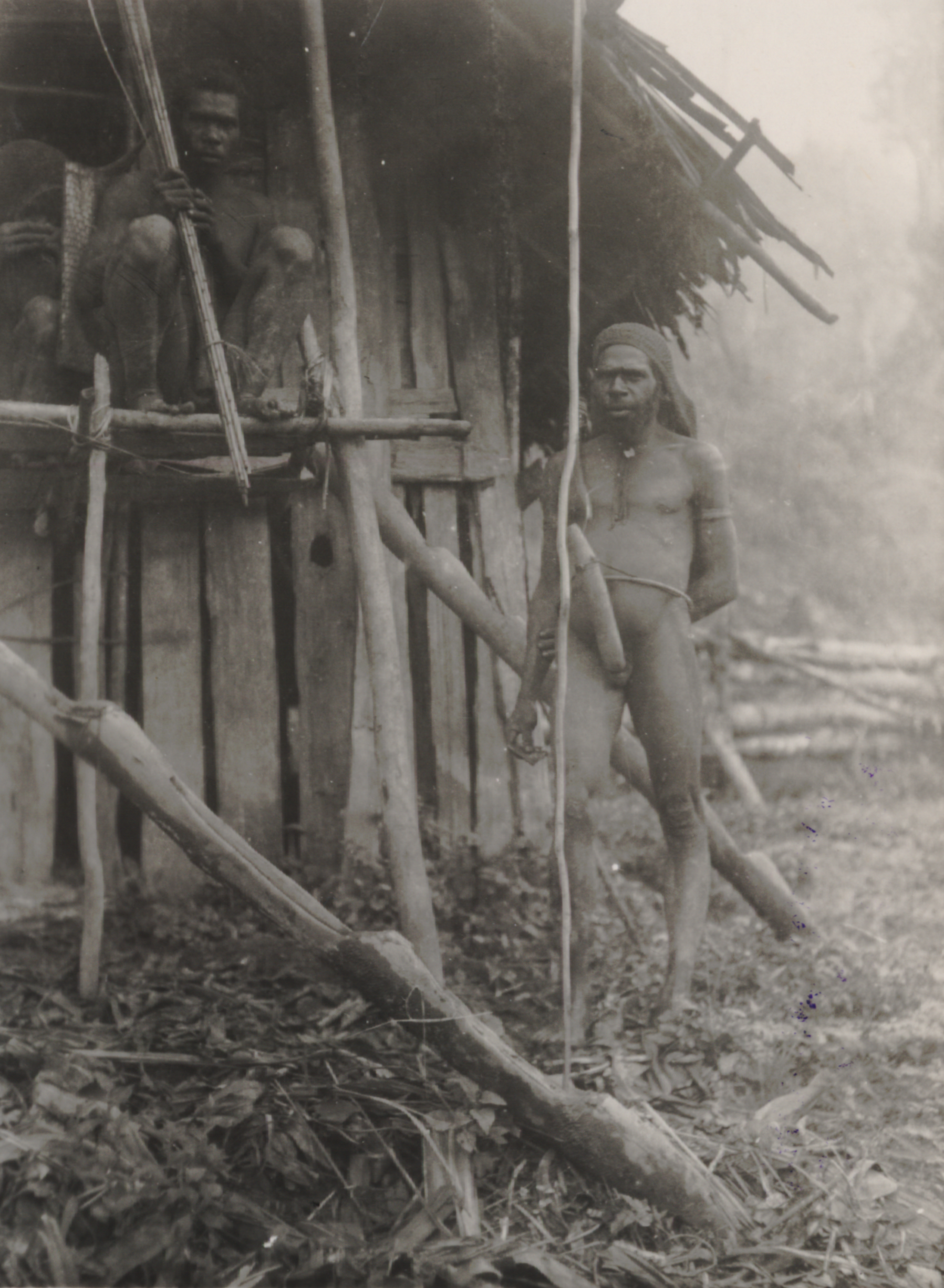

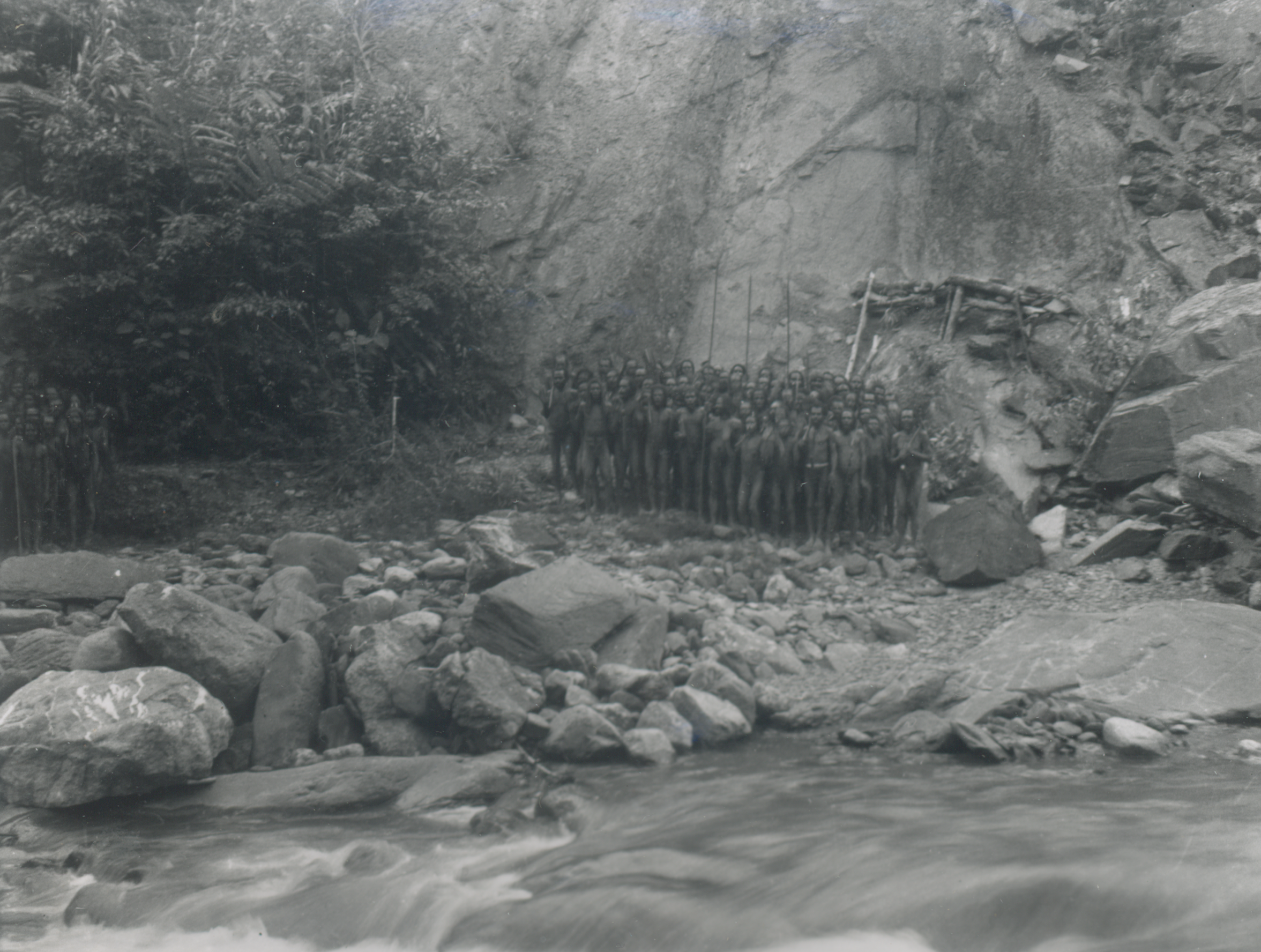

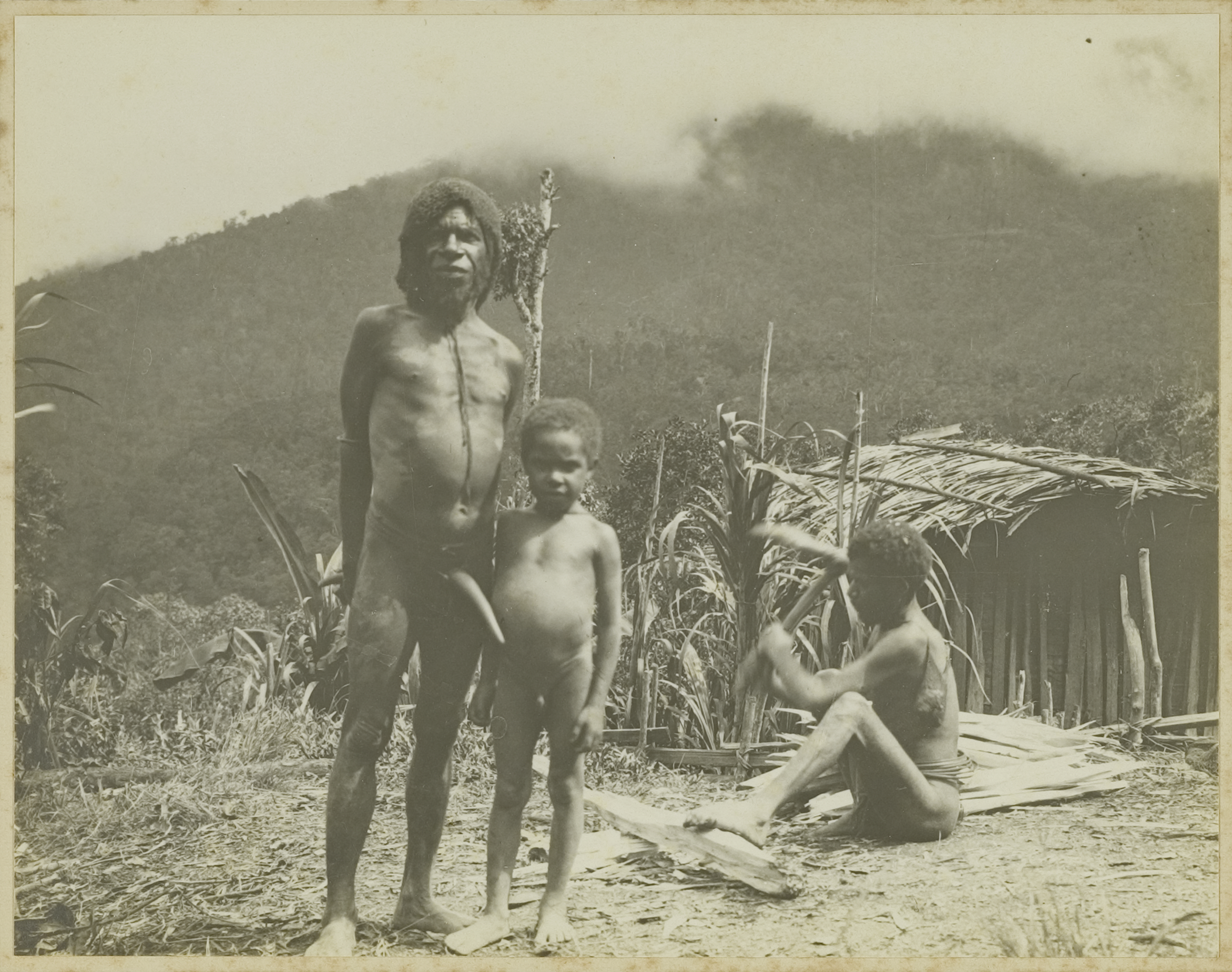

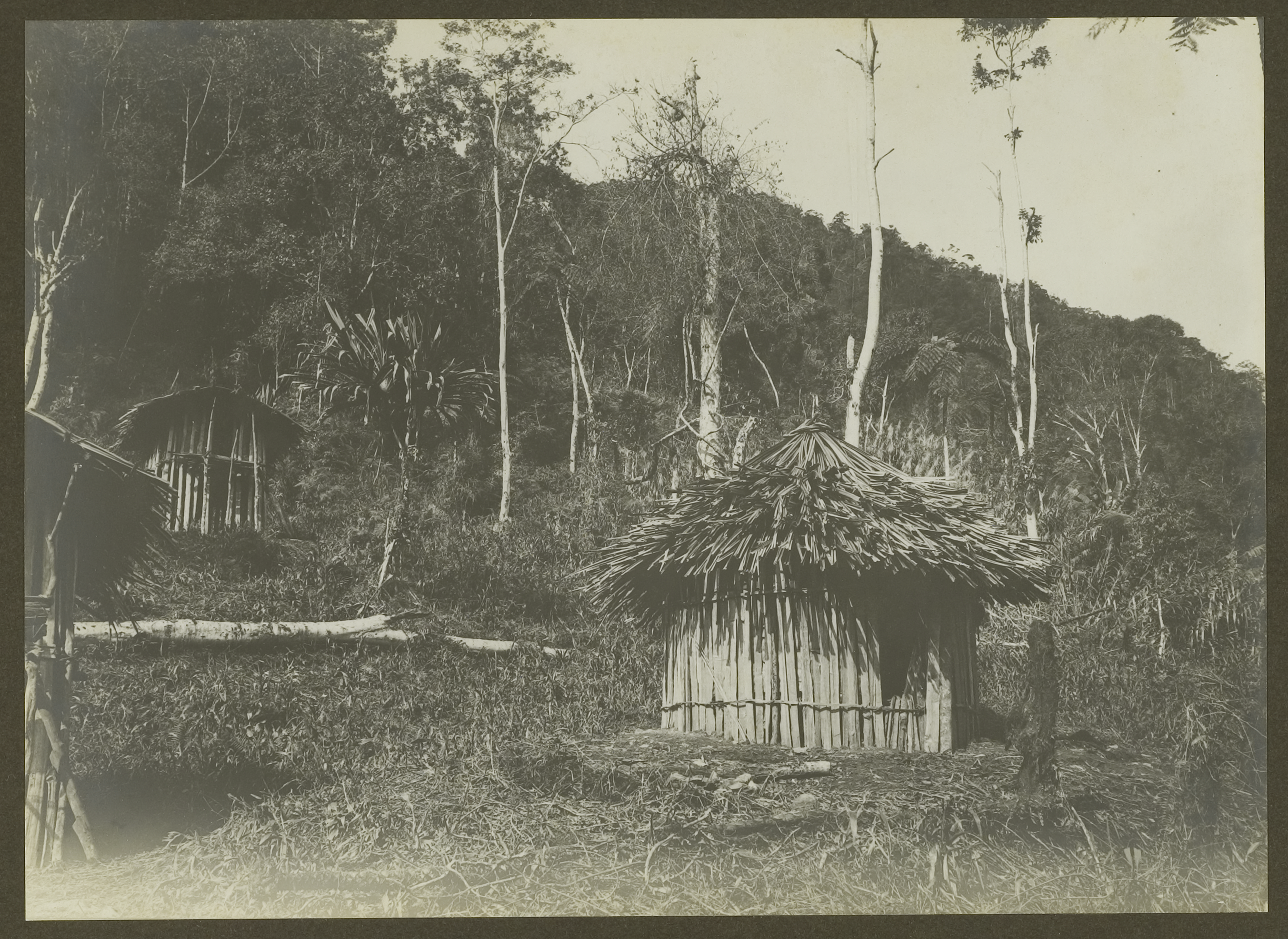

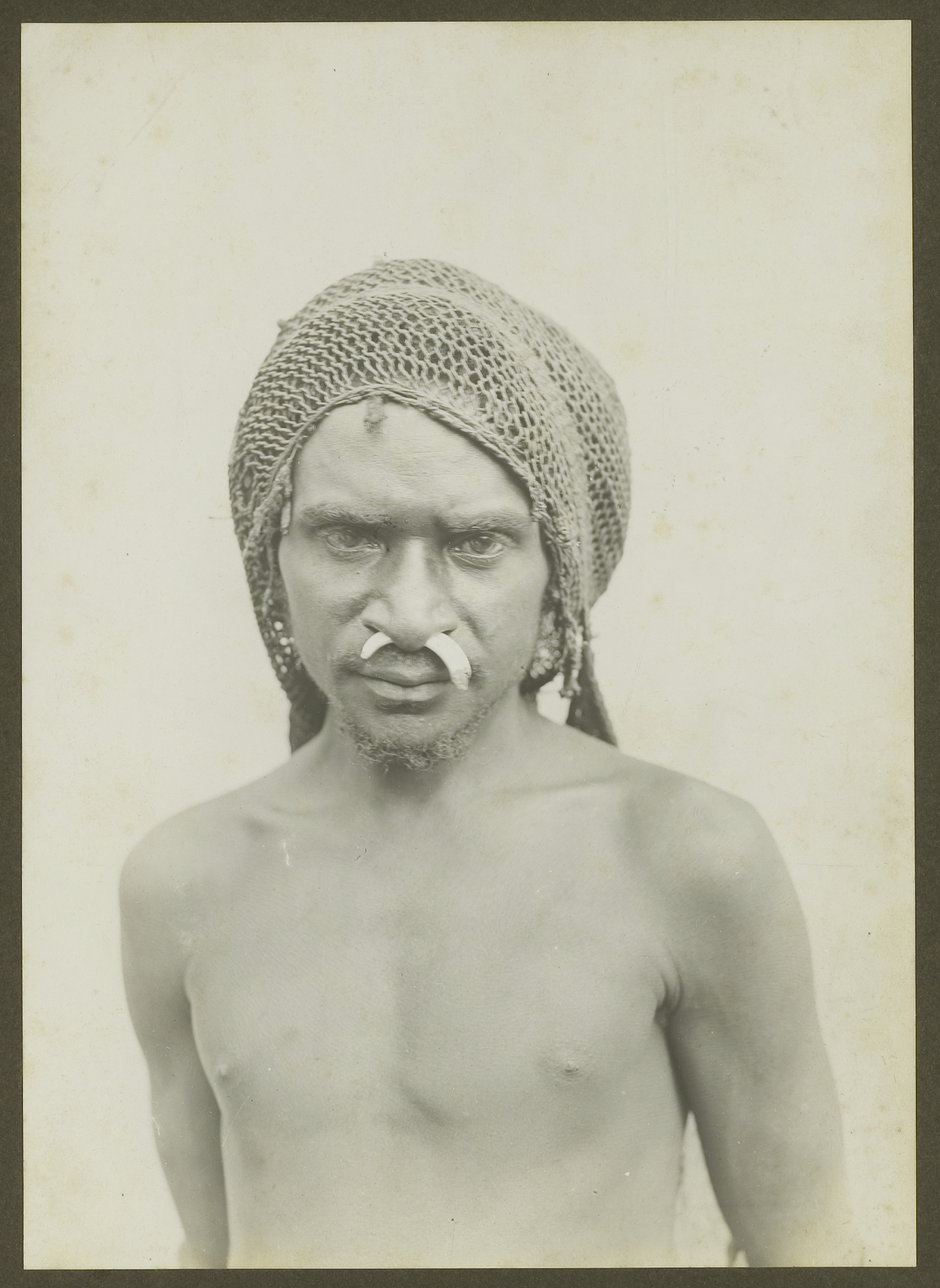

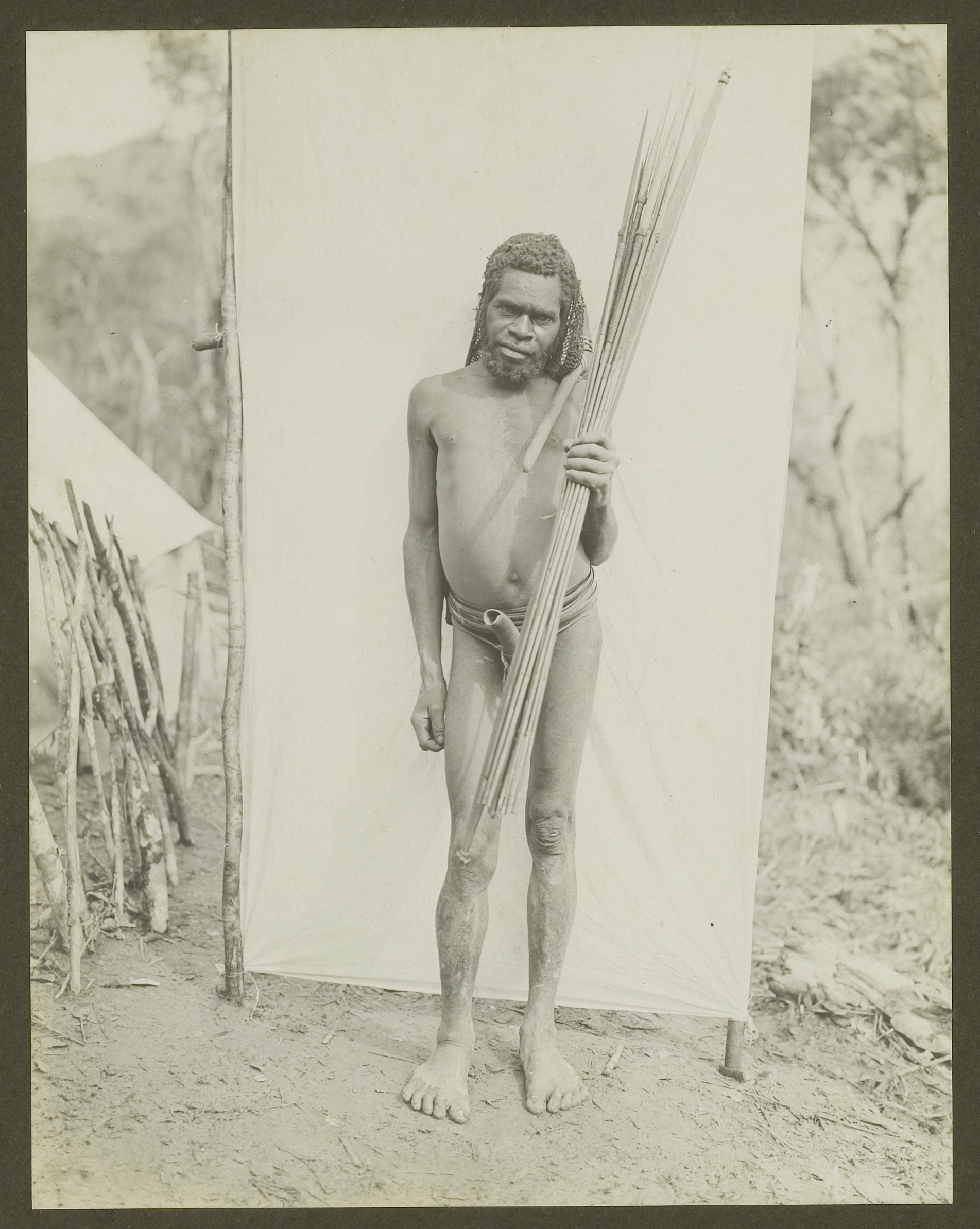

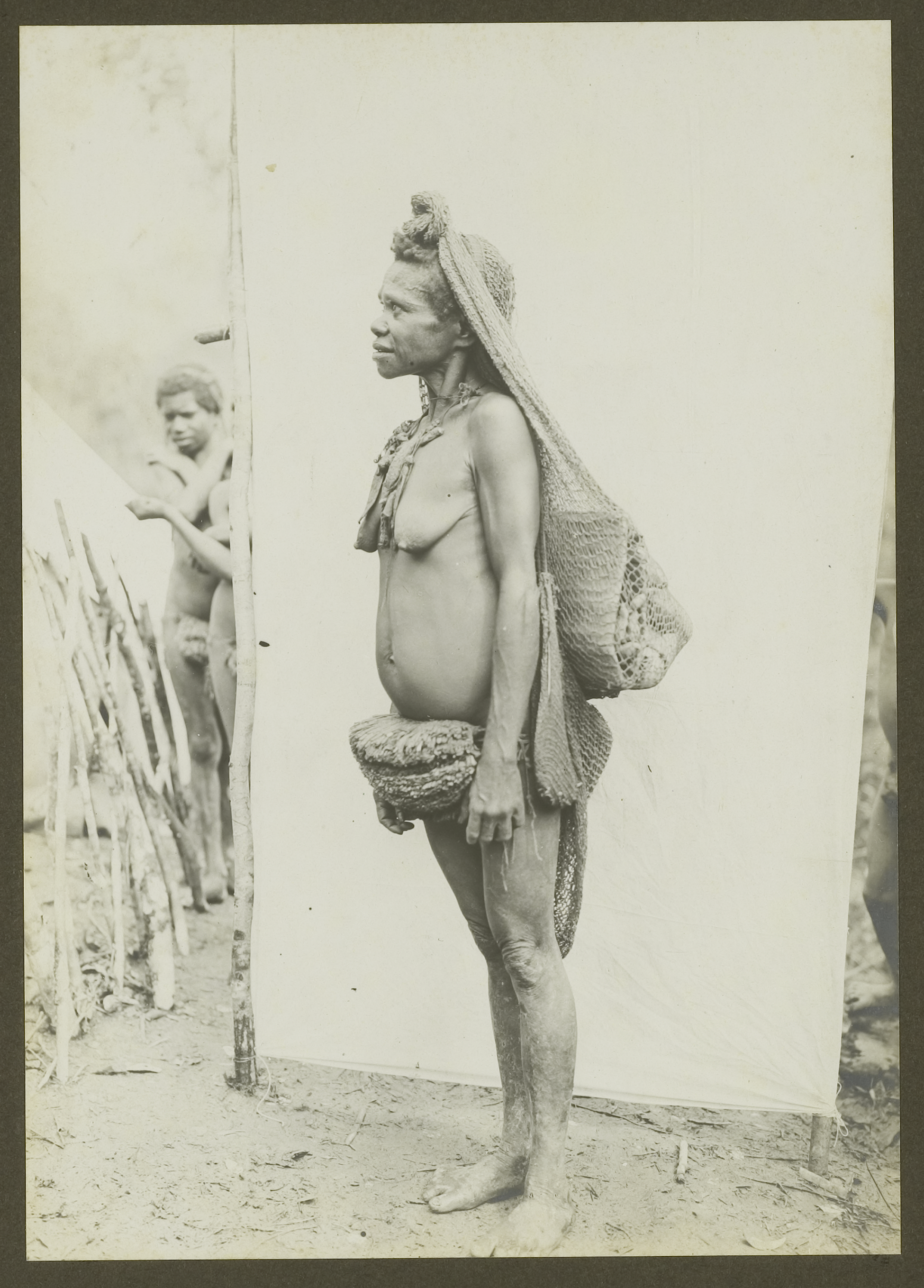
