= Dani language =

Dani may refer to:

- Dani languages of New Guinea
  - More specifically the Grand Valley Dani language
- Deni language of Brazil
