= WUL =

WUL or wul may refer to:

- Western Ultimate League, an American professional women's ultimate league founded in 2020
- Workers' Unity League, a defunct Canadian trade union
- wul, the ISO 639-3 code for Silimo language, Western New Guinea
