= Western Dani language =

Language

Western Dani
- Lani
- Region: Highland Papua, Indonesia
- Ethnicity: Lani
- Native speakers: (180,000 cited 1993)
- Language family: Trans–New Guinea: West Trans–New Guinea; Irian Highlands ?; Dani languages; Dani proper; Western Dani

Language codes
- ISO 639-3: dnw
- Glottolog: west2594

Western Dani, or Lani, is a Nuclear-Trans-New Guinea language. It is the Papuan language with the most speakers in Indonesian New Guinea. It is spoken by the Lani people in the province of Highland Papua.

The Baliem Valley tribes are called Oeringoep and Timorini in literature from the 1920s, but those names are no longer used.

== Phonology ==
=== Consonants ===
The consonant phoneme inventory of Western Dani has been described as follows:

Consonant phonemes
		Bilabial	Alveolar	Velar		Glottal
		Bilabial	Alveolar	plain	lab.	Glottal
Nasal		m	n			
Plosive	voiceless	p	t	k	kʷ	ʔ
Plosive	prenasal	ᵐb	ⁿd	ᵑɡ	ᵑɡʷ	
Fricative		β		ɣ	ɣʷ	
Flap			ɾ			
Lateral			l			
Approximant		w	ɹ			

At the beginning of words, oral stops have aspirated allophones [pʰ, tʰ, kʰ, kʷʰ]; intervocalically, voiceless /p t k / have voiced allophones [β d ~ ɾ ɣ ~ ʁ], for instance following the prefix no-/na- meaning "my".

	Word-initial	Intervocalic	Word-final
/p/	[ pʰɐɾum ] ‘corn’	[ nɔβɐɾum ] ‘my corn’	[ ɐːp ] ‘men’
/t/	[ tʰowe ] ‘bird’	[ nɐɾowe] ‘my bird’	[ ɐɾet ] ‘certainly’
/k/	[ kʰɒm ] ‘taro’	[ nɐɣɒm ] ‘my taro’	[ lek ] ‘no’

An intervocalic /ɣ/ is pronounced as [ʁ], and a /ɹ/ before a high vowel becomes a fricative [z].

=== Vowels ===
Vowel phonemes
	Front	Central	Back
High	i iː		u uː
Mid	e eː		ɒ ɒː
Low		ɐ ɐː	ɒ ɒː

Vowels /i, u, ɒ/ have allophones [ɪ, ʊ, ɔ].

Vowel length is contrastive in Western Dani, as illustrated by the minimal and near minimal pairs below:

Quality	Short	Long
/e/ vs. /eː/	/ teʁe / ‘stick’	/ teːʁe / ‘drive away’
/ɐ/ vs. /ɐː/	/ ɐɣe / ‘tail’	/ ɐːɣe / ‘steam’
/ɒ/ vs. /ɒː/	/ kɒɾɒk / ‘fill’	/ kɒːɾɒk / ‘near’
/u/ vs. /uː/	/ jum / ‘net bag’	/ uːm / ‘shoulder’
