= Yali language =

Dani language spoken in Indonesia

Yali
- Yalimo
- Native to: Indonesia
- Region: Highland Papua
- Ethnicity: Yali
- Native speakers: (30,000 cited 1988–1999)
- Language family: Trans–New Guinea: West Trans–New Guinea; Irian Highlands ?; Dani languages; Ngalik; Yali

Language codes
- ISO 639-3: Variously: yli – Anggurk Yali nlk – Ninia Yali yac – Pass Valley Yali
- Glottolog: yali1257

Yali (Yaly, Jalè, Jaly) is a Papuan language of Indonesian New Guinea. The Yali people live east of the Baliem Valley, in the Western Highlands.

Dialectical differentiation is great enough that Ethnologue assigns separate codes to three varieties:

- Pass Valley, also known as Abenaho, North Ngalik, and Western Yali; subdialects are Pass Valley, Landikma, Apahapsili.
- Ninia, also known as North Ngalik and Southern Yali (Yali Selatan).
- Angguruk, also known as Northern Yali.

However, almost nothing is known of this language. Not even the pronouns were attested for Ross (2005) to base a classification on.

Siegfried Zöellner, a German missionary, translated the Bible into Yali between 1960 and 1973.

== Phonology ==
The phonology of the Yali language:

Consonants
		Bilabial	Alveolar	Palatal	Velar	Glottal
Nasal		m	n			
Plosive	plain	b	d		k ɡ	
Plosive	prenasal	ᵐb	ⁿd		ᵑɡ	
Plosive	aspirated	pʰ	tʰ			
Plosive	implosive		ɗ			
Fricative		f	s			h
Lateral			l			
Semivowel		w		j		

A /ɡ/ sound at the end of words is pronounced /ʁ/.

Vowels
	Front	Central	Back
Close	i		u
Mid	e		o
Low		a	

== Basic words and phrases ==
The following is a list of basic words and phrases in the Yali language:

- howam fano wellahen - how are you
- waa waa - thank you
- ninim ar - you're welcome
- nomin - friend
- fano - good
- ari - that
- du - this
- eke - and
- nune - speak/talk
- inune - language
- nare - man
- nowam - my news/state
- howam - your (sg.) news/state
- wellahi - for myself
- wellahen - for yourself
- wallahen - for him/herself
- wallahi - for ourselves
- wellahep - for yourselves/themselves
- fam - *end of statement particle
- an nahien - I am pleased
- an ari nindi - I like that
- an den angge - I have
- ar an nomin - S/he is my friend
- an nomini - They are my friends
- ar nomin fano - S/he is a good friend
- ir an nomini Amerikoan - My friends are from America
- an nune Yali inune fam - I speak Yali

== Pronouns ==
These are the personal pronouns of the Yali language:

Free pronouns
	Singular	Plural
1st person	an	nir
2nd person	har	hir
3rd person	ar	ir
