= Society for the Promotion of the Physical Exploration of the Dutch Colonies =

Dutch research institute

- Formation: 14 May 1890
- Type: Research institute
- Location: Amsterdam, Netherlands

The Society for the Promotion of the Physical Exploration of the Dutch Colonies (Dutch: Maatschappij ter Bevordering van het Natuurkundig Onderzoek der Nederlandsche Koloniën) was founded on 14 May 1890 in Amsterdam, with the mission of increasing the knowledge of the botany of the Dutch colonies.

This knowledge had applications both in pure science, as well as the fields of agriculture and industry. To that end, from the late 19th century to the eve of World War II, the Society equipped expeditions to explore Dutch overseas territories.

A number of famous classical and exploration trips to, among other Borneo and Dutch New Guinea were developed by and under the auspices of the Society and the Indian Committee for Scientific Investigations, a sister organisation in Batavia, Dutch East Indies.

In the early 21st century, the society is now known as "The Treub Society" after its founder, Melchior Treub.

== Main expeditions ==
- 1899-1900 - The Siboga Expedition of Max Weber
- 1903 - The North New Guinea Expedition of A. Wichmann
- 1907 - The First South New Guinea Expedition of H.A. Lorentz
- 1909-1910 - The Second South New Guinea Expedition of H.A. Lorentz
- 1912-1913 - The Third South New Guinea Expedition of A. Franssen Herderschee
- 1935-1936 - The Mimika Expedition of H.J.T. Bijlmer
