= Indian Committee for Scientific Investigations =

Indonesian-based research institute

Indies Committee for Scientific Investigations (Dutch: Indisch Comité voor Wetenschappelijke Onderzoekingen, ICWO), founded in 1897 in Batavia, Dutch East Indies, with the mission of exploring the land and people of the East Indies, for the interests of agriculture and industry.

The Committee gave opinions on scientific research, with special areas of geology, botany, zoology, physical anthropology and anthropology and worked as much as possible in accordance with the Society for the Promotion of the Physical Exploration of the Dutch Colonies, a similar institution in Amsterdam.

It represented the interests of those in the Dutch East Indies Company, prepared the expeditions of Dutch research teams and provided advice and support given to individual scientists.

Thus ICWO sponsored the Central New Guinea Expedition of 1920-1922 and the Dutch participation in the Dutch-American Central New Guinea Expedition in 1926-1927, better known as the Stirling Expedition.
