= Grand Valley Dani language =

Papuan language of Indonesian New Guinea (Papua)

Grand Valley Dani
- Native to: Indonesia
- Region: Highland Papua
- Ethnicity: Dani and Lani
- Native speakers: (90,000 cited 1990–1996)
- Language family: Trans–New Guinea: West Trans–New Guinea; Irian Highlands ?; Dani languages; Dani proper; Grand Valley Dani

Language codes
- ISO 639-3: Variously: dni – Lower dnt – Mid dna – Upper hap – Hupla
- Glottolog: gran1246

Grand Valley Dani, or simply Dani, is one of the most populous Papuan languages in Indonesian New Guinea (also known as Papua). The Dani people live in the Baliem Valley of the Western Highlands.

== Dialects ==
Dialectical differentiation is great enough that Ethnologue assigns separate codes to three varieties:

- Lower
- Mid or Central, also known as Tulem
- Upper

Lower Grand Valley Dani contains subdialects Lower Grand Valley Hitigima (Dani-Kurima, Kurima), Upper Bele, Lower Bele, Lower Kimbin (Kibin), and Upper Pyramid. Hupla, traditionally considered a separate language, is closer to Lower Grand Valley than the varieties of Grand Valley Dani are to each other.

== Phonology ==
Grand Valley Dani has established its own orthography during a conference between linguists of the Dutch New Guinea government and different missionary bodies in February 1961. This is the phonology of the Central Grand Valley Dani language:

=== Consonants ===
		Bilabial	Alveolar	Palatal	Velar		Glottal
		Bilabial	Alveolar	Palatal	plain	labial	Glottal
Nasal		m	n		ŋ ⟨ng⟩		
Plosive	tenuis	p ⟨b, p⟩	t ⟨d, t⟩		k ⟨g, k⟩	kʷ ⟨gw, kw⟩	ʔ ⟨'⟩
Plosive	aspirated	pʰ ⟨p, ph⟩	tʰ ⟨t, th⟩		kʰ ⟨k, kh⟩	kʷʰ ⟨kw, kwh⟩	
Implosive		ɓ ⟨bp⟩	ɗ ⟨dl⟩				
Fricative			s				h
Approximant			l	j		w	

Unlike other orthographies of local languages in Indonesia (largely based on the standard orthography), the original Grand Valley Dani orthography (the current one might be not known) has j instead of y, in common with the Indonesian old spelling.

- The letters ⟨p, t, k⟩ are pronounced as aspirated /pʰ, tʰ, kʰ/ in word-initial position and as [β, ɾ, ɣ] in intervocalic positions, respectively. They merge with voiceless /p, t, k/ syllable-finally, which is also represented by graphic voiced consonants ⟨b, d, g⟩. However, aspirated consonants still occur intervocalically.
  - Medial ⟨pp, tt, kk⟩ are either pronounced as /p, t, k/ or as geminated /pː, tː, kː/.
- The phoneme /h/ merges with preceding or following phonemes:
  - It aspirates preceding ⟨p, t, k⟩, creating effectively phonemic aspirated consonants in intervocalic positions (japha /japʰa/ "they fought").
  - It also compensatorily lengthened adjacent vowel or sonorants (except /j/, /w/), however, one element of the most adjacent lengthened vowel to /h/ is devoiced (wamhe /wamhe/, [wamm̥ɛ] "pig (with connective morpheme)").

=== Vowels ===
The following table illustrates Grand Valley Dani's vowel phonemes:

	Front	Central	Back
Close	i		u
Near-close	ɪ ⟨y⟩		ʊ ⟨v⟩
Open-mid	ɛ ⟨e⟩		ɔ ⟨o⟩
Open		a	

== Grammar ==
=== Verbs ===
Verbs in Grand Valley Dani are highly inflected for many tenses. Infinitive is marked by the suffix -in, although verb stems in -s- change to -t- before consonants: wetasin "to roast", but wetathy "I roasted".

==== Finite tenses ====
Default personal markers
		number	
		Singular	Plural
person	1st	-y	-o
person	2nd	-en	-ep
person	3rd	-e	-em

Although there are claimed "default" personal markers, the correspondences between tense suffixes and personal markers are often highly irregular. Nevertheless, inflections of verbs are still highly regular. Unless denoted in the table, verb forms are marked by personal markers.

List
Tense	Suffix(es)
Near future	-ikin in the singular, -ukun in the plural. Never inflected by person, only by number.
Indefinite future	-isikin in the singular, -isukun in the plural. Never inflected by person, only by number.
Near past	-h-.
Remote past	-hikh- in the 3SG, -hukh- in the 3PL, and -hVk- elsewhere. -V- is an echo vowel from the personal markers, e.g. -hyky, -heken, etc.
Perfect past	Suffixing the near past with -tik in the 1SG, -ttik in the 2SG, -sip in the 2PL and -sik elsewhere. In the second person, the final consonants of original near past endings, when suffixed, have to be deleted (-hen (2SG) + -ttik → -hettik, -hep (2PL) + -sip → -hesip). The ending for 3PL is irregular: -hasik instead of *-hemsik.
Habitual	Replacing every instances of syllable-final -i- and -sik (but not -sip → -sep) of the perfect past with -e- and -tek, respectively (-hettik → -hettek).
Habitual perfect	Infixing -si- into the main habitual ending (-hettek → -hettesik). The ending for 2PL is irregular: -hesep → -hetesip instead of *-hesesip.

		Singular			Plural		
		First	Second	Third	First	Second	Third
Future	Near	-ikin			-ukun		
Future	Indefinite	-isikin			-isukun		
Past	Near	-hy	-hen	-he	-ho	-hep	-hem
Past	Remote	-hyky	-heken	-hikhe	-huku	-hikip	-hukha
Past	Perfect	-hytik	-hettik	-hesik	-hosik	-hesip	-hasik
Habitual	Main	-hytek	-hettek	-hetek	-hotek	-hesep	-hatek
Habitual	Perfect	-hytesik	-hettesik	-hetesik	-hotesik	-hetesip	-hatesik
Progressive		-hylahy	-hylaken	-iako	-hylako	-hylakep	-iakoei

== Semantics ==
The Dani language differentiates only two basic colours, mili for cool/dark shades such as blue, green, and black, and mola for warm/light colours such as red, yellow, and white. This trait makes it an interesting field of research for language psychologists, such as Eleanor Rosch, investigating the Whorf hypothesis.
