= Hupla language =

Dani language spoken in Indonesia

Hupla
- Native to: Indonesia
- Region: Highland Papua
- Native speakers: (3,000 cited 1982)
- Language family: Trans–New Guinea: West Trans–New Guinea; Irian Highlands ?; Dani languages; Dani proper; Grand Valley Dani; Hupla

Language codes
- ISO 639-3: hap
- Glottolog: hupl1238

Hupla (also Hubla) is a Papuan language of the Indonesian province of Highland Papua, spoken by the Hubla people of Yahukimo Regency. It is similar to Lower Grand Valley Dani.

The Bible has been translated into the Hupla language.
