= Walak people =

Ethnic group in Indonesia

Walak Ab

Total population
- Around 30,000

Regions with significant populations
- Indonesia (Highland Papua)

Languages
- Walak, Indonesian

Religion
- Christianity

The Walak people (Walak: Walak Ab) are an ethnic group living in the Central Highlands, Baliem Valley, Indonesia, specifically in the valleys of Kobagma, Ilugwa, Eragayam in Central Mamberamo Regency and Wolo in Jayawijaya Regency along the Mamberamo River, between Mamberamo, Jayawijaya, and Yalimo Regencies.

== Etymology ==
The word "Walak" comes from Wanlak or Wanelak in the Walak language, meaning "I go to take" or "I am taking". It can also serve as an expression of greetings or thanks.

== Sub-tribes and traditional territory ==
The Walak people have three sub-tribes:

- Walak Mbarlima (Baliem Valley)
- Walak Iiluga Wologa
- Walak Ergarajam

Their traditional territory is divided into six regions:

- Jayawijaya Regency
  - Wolo
  - Mbalima
- Central Mamberamo Regency
  - Eragayam
  - Winam
  - Ilugwa
  - Telegai

== Customs ==
=== Naming ===
Walak people generally have three names. The first is not given immediately at birth: boys are called paite and girls nona. The first name is usually given during a small family meal. This name may change, for example after a relative’s death. When entering school, a "school name" may be given. The second is the aluak (lit. 'head') or clan name, inherited from the father. Aluak is divided into two moieties without names: Gombo and Yikwa belong to the first moiety, while Togodli, Karoba, and Uaga belong to the second. These moieties practice exogamy, requiring marriage across moieties. Women retain their aluak name after marriage. These two names are the ones used in official documents such as ID cards.

The third is a "nickname" derived from the feminine aluak of the mother (for women) or masculine aluak of the mother (for men). Adults are called by this nickname, while children are called by their first names: kodlak (girl) and abedlak (boy), or by family relationship terms such as older sibling, younger sibling, etc.

Aluak	Gombo	Karoba	Togodli
Masculine	Gomenak	Karobanak	Tabenak
Feminine	Gomboge	Karobage	Tabuni

=== Politics and society ===
Walak society recognizes three age categories: children (kodlak = girls, abedlak = boys), adults (kwe = women, ab = men), and elders (kwe angok = grandmother, ab angok = grandfather). The tribal leader (ab angok) is the most respected individual, leading one aluak or umbu clan. Blood relations are not guaranteed within an aluak; those descended from a common ancestor are called umbu. Villages have a head, secretary, and several tribal leaders receiving government salaries, elected by villagers. There is also a dao kepala inombaye, chosen to manage food distribution in stone-burning ceremonies. The Walak people are organized in the Ikatan Keluarga Suku Walak (IKSWAL).

== Culture ==
=== Clothing ===
Adult men wear traditional koteka (penis sheath) called hebe or kebe, carrying 3–4 metres (9.8–13.1 ft) wooden spears. Women wear grass skirts called sali or wah. Headgear uses animal feathers: red for men, and white for women. Body paint is brown and black, with black from coconut oil and charcoal, and brown from clay.

=== Traditional houses ===
Related Walak households gather into units called lokasi, housing one or several nuclear families. Men's honai houses are belamu, usually at the opposite end of the entrance. Women's houses are uma, and the cooking house is konela. Units may include pig pens and small gardens. Sleeping arrangements are flexible; men may sleep upstairs and women downstairs if necessary.

=== Ambiaro dance ===
A dance performed by twenty-four people, twelve men and twelve women, forming a circle. One or two participants act as war commanders protecting the group. Music uses the goknggaik instrument, and often features the song Wasioayamari ("Let Us Unite").

The dance recounts Papuan ancestors believed to have migrated from Yunnan, via Taiwan, Philippines, Papua New Guinea, and east to Ifala Island, then to Genyem, spreading across Papua.
