= Walak language =

Papuan language

Walak
- Region: Highland Papua: Jayawijaya Regency, Mamberamo Tengah Regency, Yalimo Regency
- Ethnicity: Walak people
- Native speakers: 20,000 (2007)
- Language family: Trans–New Guinea: West Trans–New Guinea; Irian Highlands ?; Dani languages; Dani proper; Walak

Language codes
- ISO 639-3: wlw
- Glottolog: wala1269

Walak is a Baliem Valley languages spoken by the Walak people of Jayawijaya and Central Mamberamo Regency in the Indonesian province of Highland Papua.
