= Lani people =

Indigenous people in Western New Guinea

Lani people Western Dani
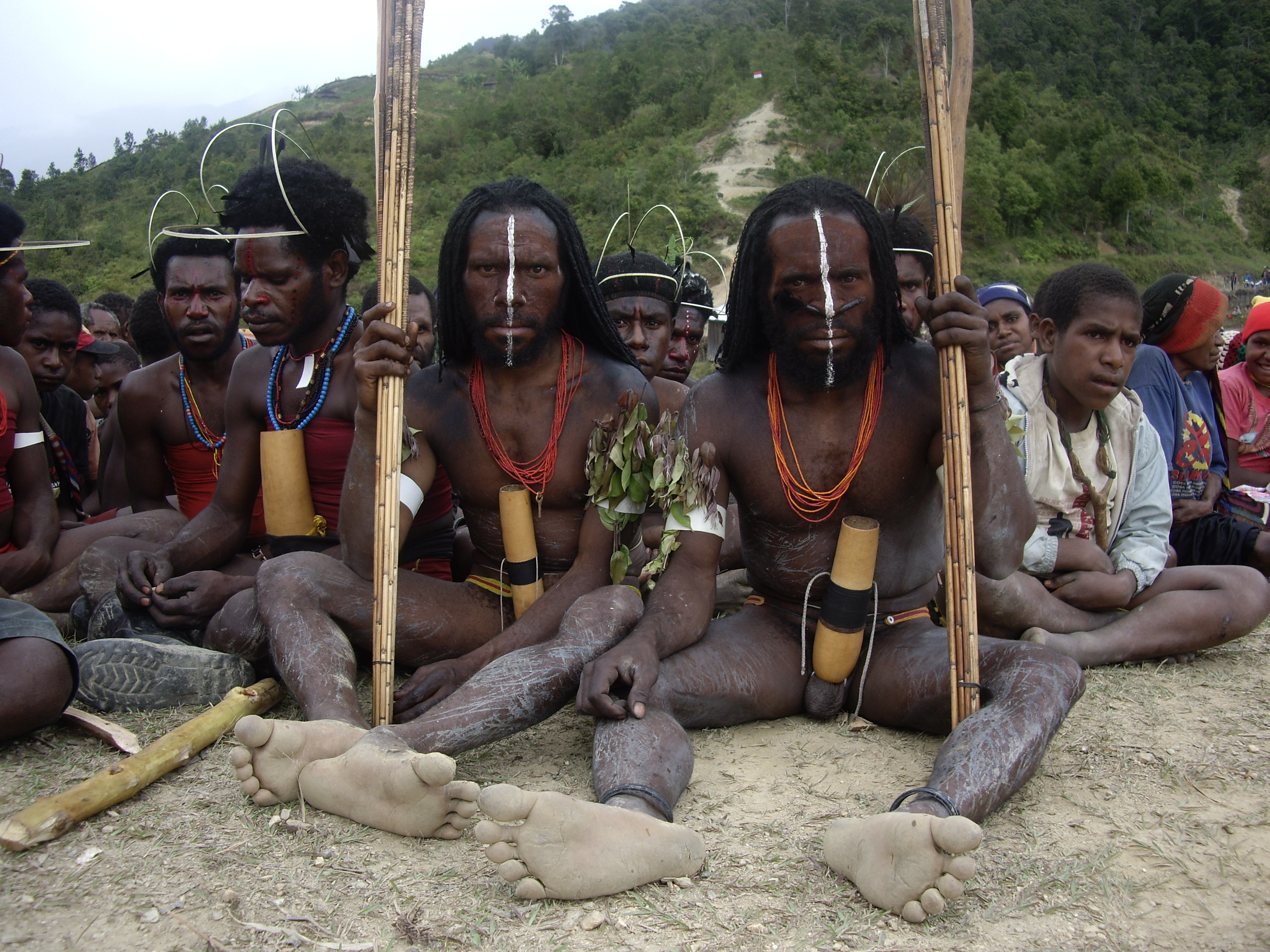
- Villagers from Kampung Dugu-Dugu, Kuyawage, Lanny Jaya

Total population
- about 200.000 people.

Regions with significant populations
- Indonesia (Central Papua and Highland Papua)

Languages
- Lani, Upper Dani, Indonesian

Religion
- Christianity, animism

Related ethnic groups
- Damal, Dani, Yali

The Lani are an indigenous people in Puncak, Central Papua and Lanny Jaya, Highland Papua, usually labelled 'Western Dani' by foreign missionaries, or grouped—inaccurately—with the Dani people who inhabit the Baliem Valley to the east.

== First contact with Europeans ==
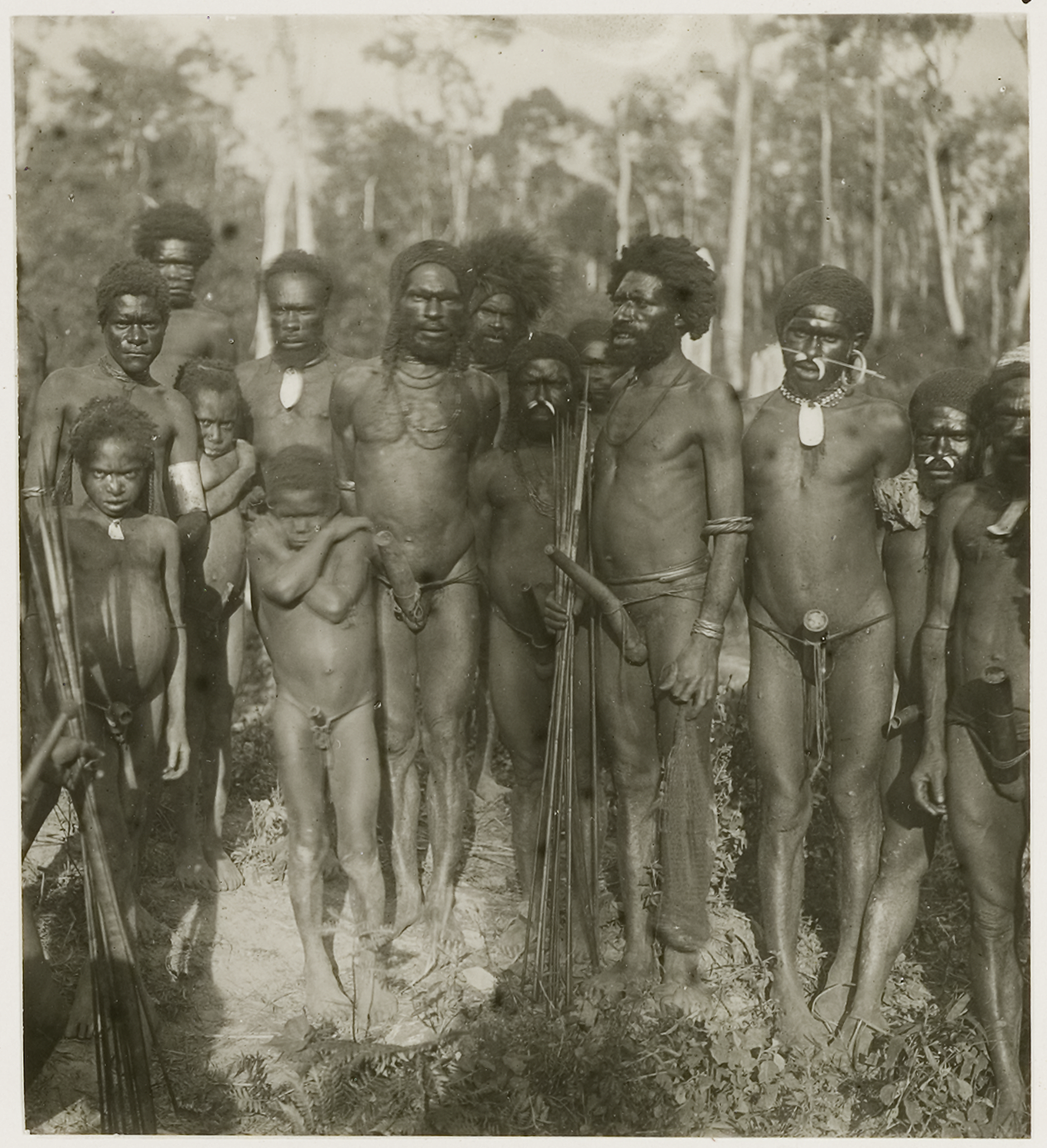
The Lani of Toli valley during the 1920s expedition, then called Timorini.

First contact with the populous Lani was made in October 1920 during the Central New Guinea Expedition, in which a group of explorers stayed for six months with them at their farms in the upper Swart River Valley (now Toli Valley, Tolikara Regency). The first white people to live among the Lani of Kanggime in Tolikara were John "Tolibaga" and Helen "Tukwe" Dekker, under whose ministry the Christian population among the Lani grew to 13,000.

== Population ==
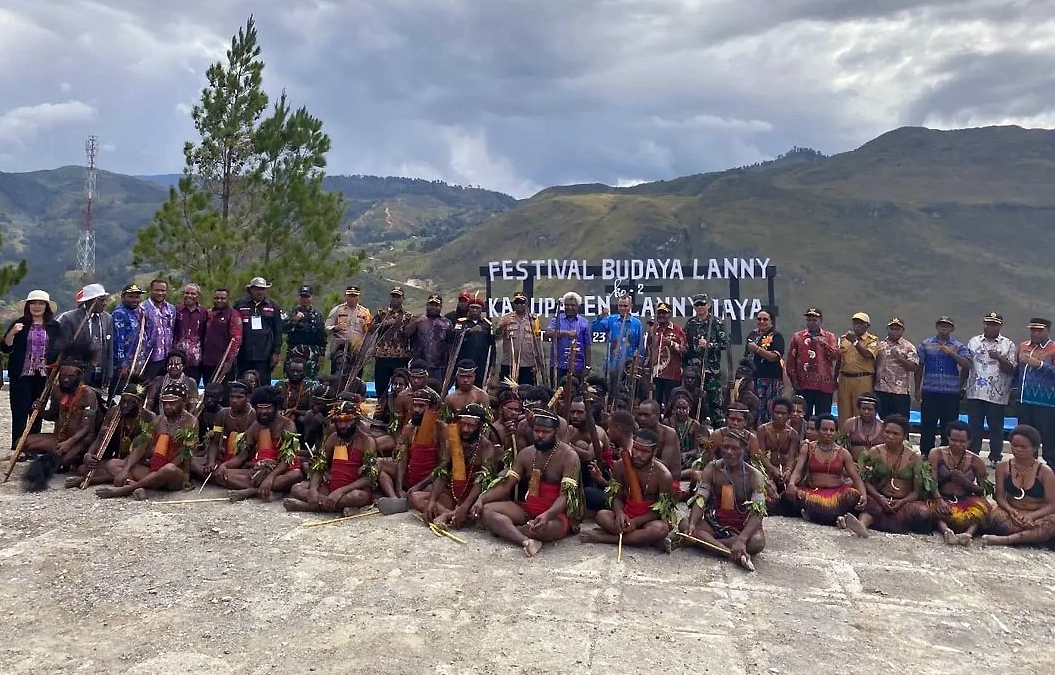
2023 Lani Culture Festival in Tiom, Lanny Jaya

The total population of Lani tribes in the 1980s, as reported by Douglas Hayward in his book The Dani of Irian Jaya, Before and After Conversion was around 200,000 people.

== Culture ==
The most distinguishable feature of the Lani and Dani tribes is their kotekas, or penis gourds made from the bottle gourd. Lani men wear kobewak or kobeba, which are thicker and larger (can have a diameter of 10 cm or more) and are flat at the top. The large kobewaks are used to hold tobacco and other valuables. The directions of the kobeba depend on the social status of the wearer; straight upright meant the wearer is a virgin male. If it leans to the right, the wearer is brave, rich, and nobleman; on the other hand, leaning left meant the wearer is a descendant of Panglima Perang or Apendabogur (war chief). Meanwhile Lani women wear two types of skirt made of barks, the colourful green, yellow, red, and purple sali koe or the brown and purple tipped skirt called sali keragi.

== See also ==
- Indigenous people of New Guinea
- Forgotten Bird of Paradise
