= Wano language =

Papuan language of Indonesia

Wano
- Region: Puncak Regency and Puncak Jaya Regency, Central Papua
- Ethnicity: Wano people
- Native speakers: 1,000 (2011)
- Language family: Trans–New Guinea: West Trans–New Guinea (Irian Highlands); Dani; Wano

Language codes
- ISO 639-3: wno
- Glottolog: wano1243
- ELP: Wano

Wano is a Baliem Valley language spoken by the Wano people in Puncak and Puncak Jaya regencies of the Indonesian province of Central Papua.

== Phonology ==
Consonant phonemes
	Bilabial	Alveolar	Palatal	Velar	Glottal
Nasal	m	n			
Plosive	p b	t d		k	ʔ
Fricative	β				
Approximant			j	w	

Vowel phonemes
	Front	Back
High	i	u
Mid	ɛ	ɔ
Close	a	

As well as the monophthongs described above, Wano also has seven diphthongs: /i̯a/, /ɛi̯/, /ai̯/, /au̯/, /ɔi̯/, /ɔu̯/, and /ui̯/.

=== Allophony ===
- The voiced plosives /b/ and /d/ are imploded to /ɓ/ and /ɗ/ when word-initially and intervocalically.
- When a nasal occurs before /p/, /p/ becomes a prenasalized voiced plosive [ᵐb]. Similarly, when a nasal occurs before /t/ or /k/, they become, respectively, [ⁿd] and [ᵑɡ].
- /t/ and /k/ intervocalically become /ɾ/ and /ɣ/.
- /p/, /k/, /ɡ/, and /ɡ/'s allophone, [ᵑɡ] become labialized before /w/, with /ɡ/ becoming [ɣʷ].
- The sequences /tj/ and /dj/ become the palatal fricatives /ç ʝ/. However, this analysis more signifies the corresponding Dutch digraphs, since these have no morphological significance, and in the modern orthography these are written as ⟨c⟩ and ⟨j⟩.

=== Orthography ===
Here is the orthography used by Willem Burung on his works. These are not necessarily separate letters.

Letter	IPA	Letter	IPA	Letter	IPA
a	[a]	j	[ʝ]	o	[ɔ]
b	[ɓ]	k	[k]	p	[p]
c	[ç]	kʷ	[kʷ]	t	[t]
d	[ɗ]	m	[m]	u	[u]
e	[ɛ]	mb	[ᵐb]	v	[β]
g	[ɣ]	n	[n]	w	[w]
gw	[ɣʷ]	nd	[ⁿd]	y	[j]
i	[i]	ngg	[ᵑɡ]		

== Grammar ==
=== Nouns ===
Inalienable nouns could be pluralized by suffixing -i (after consonants) or -vi (after vowels), while alienable nouns do not (similar to Indonesian, where pluralization is optional). The inalienable plurals can be postposed with numerals (aburi kena "her two children").

== See also ==
- Duvle-Wano Pidgin

== Bibliography ==
- Burung, Willem (2016). A grammar of Wano (PhD thesis). University of Oxford.
