= Nduga language =

Dani language spoken in Indonesia

Nduga
- Native to: Indonesia
- Region: Nduga Regency, Highland Papua
- Ethnicity: Nduga
- Native speakers: (10,000 cited 1985)
- Language family: Trans–New Guinea: West Trans–New Guinea; Irian Highlands ?; Dani languages; Ngalik; Nduga

Language codes
- ISO 639-3: ndx
- Glottolog: ndug1245

Nduga is a Papuan language of the Indonesian New Guinea Highlands province of Highland Papua.
