= Baliem Valley languages =

Family of Trans–New Guinea languages of Papua, Indonesia

Dani
- Baliem Valley
- Geographic distribution: Baliem Valley in Highland Papua
- Ethnicity: Dani, Lani, Yali, etc
- Linguistic classification: Trans–New Guinea: West Papuan Highlands (Irian Highlands); Dani
- Subdivisions: Wano; Dani proper; Ngalik

Language codes
- Glottolog: dani1287

The Dani or Baliem Valley languages are a family of clearly related Trans–New Guinea languages spoken by the Dani and related peoples in the Baliem Valley in the Highland Papua, Indonesia. Foley (2003) considers their Trans–New Guinea language group status to be established. They may be most closely related to the languages of Paniai Lakes, but this is not yet clear. Capell (1962) posited that their closest relatives were the Kwerba languages, which Ross (2005) rejects.

== Languages ==
Larson (1977) divided the family into three branches based on lexicostatistics, and Nggem was later added as a fourth. The Ngalik languages are very poorly attested.

- Dani family
  - Wano
  - Nggem
  - Central Dani:
    - Grand Valley Dani (upper, lower, and mid dialects)
    - Hupla
    - Western Dani–Walak
  - Ngalik:
    - Nduga
    - Silimo
    - Yali (dialect cluster)

== Phonemes ==
Usher (2020) reconstructs the consonant inventory as follows. This is identical to the reconstruction of Bromley (from 1966–1967) apart from adding the rare consonants *pʷ and *mbʷ, and the possible additional vowel *ɐ.

Consonants
		Labial		Alveolar	Palatal	Velar	
Nasal		*m		*n			
Stop	Voiceless	*p	*pʷ	*t		*k	*kʷ
Stop	Pre-nasalized	*ᵐb	*ᵐbʷ	*ⁿd		*ᵑg	*ᵑgʷ
Stop	Implosive	*ɓ		*ɗ			
Approximant		*w		*l	*j		

Vowels
	Front	Central	Back
Close	*i		*u
Near-close	*ɪ		*ʊ
Mid	*e	[*ɐ]	*o
Open		*a	

And the diphthongs *ei, *ou, *ai, *au.

== Pronouns ==
Ross (1995) reconstructs the independent pronouns and possessive/object prefixes of Central Dani as:

	singular	plural
1	*an, *n[a]	*ni-t, *nin[a]-
2	*ka-t, *k[a]	*ki-t, *kin[a]-
3	*a-t, *∅/w-	*i-t, *in[a]-

== Vocabulary comparison ==
The following basic vocabulary words are from Bromley (1967) and Voorhoeve (1975), as cited in the Trans-New Guinea database.

The words cited constitute translation equivalents, whether they are cognate (e.g. nakapak, ogobak, nokopak for “nose”) or not (e.g. natði, nemake, nabilikagen for “tongue”).

gloss	Dani Lower Grand Valley (Hitigima dial.)	Dani Lower Grand Valley (Tangma dial.)	Dani Lower Grand Valley	Dani Mid Grand Valley	Dani Upper Grand Valley	Dani Western	Walak	Silimo (South Ngalik dial.)	Silimo	Yali Angguruk	Yali Pass Valley
head	mʊkkʊl-oak	mʊkkʊl-oak	nukul-oaq	nʊgʊl-oak	nanupah	aneb; anobak	nalupak	naŋgul	nagʊl	nʊgʊl	hou
hair	nesi	nesi	nesi	nesi	neeti	eeɾuwak; neti	niti	nenasu	nasu	notuk	hoŋ
ear	nesakko	nesakko		nasuk	natuk [nařuk]	aɾuk	natuk [nařuk]		nesago	nɪsago	
eye	neil-ekken	neil-ekken	neil-eken	nel-egen	neneken	enegen; negen	nil	nələŋgen	nɪlegen	nɪl	həŋ
nose	nappisan	namisaŋ		nakouwak-oak	nakapak	ogobak	nokopak		nebijaŋ	nabijaŋ	
tooth	naik	naik	naik	naik	nɪk	neik	naik	neniak	nɪak; neak	najek	si
tongue	nameli	namili		na∂i	namɪlɪ	amela	natði		nemake	nabilikagen	
leg			nesoq			iyok; owak					yan saŋ
louse	napɪ	napɪ	navi	napɪ	napɪ	abee	napɪ		nekepɪ; pɪ	pɪ	am
dog	jekke	jekke	yake	jege	gewo	gewo; nggewo	gewo	yeŋge	mene	mene	kam
pig	wam	wam	wam	wam	wa:n	wam	wam	wam	wam	wam	meya
bird	sʊe	sʊe	sue	tʊe	tewe	tewe; towe	tewe	tuwe	sʊe	suwe	winaŋ
egg	sʊe-kken	sʊe-kken	sue-ken	tʊe-gen	tewe-gen	eko	tewe-gen	eŋgen	sʊe-egen	suwe-gen	winaŋ won
blood	mep	mep	mep	mep	mep	amiya; muya	mep		mep	gete; mep	iniŋ
bone	noak	noak	noaq	noak	nowakano	owak	nowak		nʊak	noak	yok
skin	noat	nakap	naxap	noatðo	nakatlo	agabelo	nakatðo		nakap	nakap	pok
breast	neilak	neilak		niðak	nelak	elak	neðak		nakamʊ	nak	
tree	o	e	e	o	ejo	eyo	o	bene	e	e	
man	ap	ap	ap		ap	ap		ap	ap	ap	nimnya
woman	he; hɪmɪ	he; hʊmɪ		he	kwe		kwe		kwamɪ	keap	
sky						mbogut					
sun	mo	mo	mo	mʊlɪgɪ	mo	oonegen; yawo	mo; o-il		mo	mo	hin
moon	tuki	tuki		tʊt	tʊt	tut	tʊt		duki	bikkalem	
water	i	i	i	i	ji	mio; nio; niyo		i; ies	ik	ik	tin
fire	hettouk	ettu	etu	hɪdʊ [hɪtʊ]	ɪdʊ [ɪndʊ]	endo; kani	idu	enduk	odʊk	idok	uk
stone	helep	helep	helep	helegit [helekit]	jʊkum	yugum; yukum	git [ŋgit]	kəlip	kelep	kelep	kirik
road, path	ke; kwe	kwe		holak-aðem	tuwan		tuwan		epela	pʊgalem	
name	ettake	ettake	eraxe	edaka [etaga]	edaka [endaga]	endage; etaxe	edaka		onuk	unuk	nimnya
eat					namen	namen!; ne-; nengge		nənəm-	emen	namɪn (ɪs ?)	(kwaniŋ) etiŋ
one	makke-at; pakke-at	oppakke-at	opake-at	bagɪ-at	abɪ	ambe; ambit	omagi-at	ambui	mesik	mɪsɪk	sendeik
two	pete; pɪte	p:ie	pere	bete [peře]	bete [mbeře]	bere; mbeɾe	bete	pere	biten	biten	phenep

== Evolution ==
Dani reflexes of proto-Trans-New Guinea (pTNG) etyma are:

Grand Valley Dani language:

- ap 'man' < *ambi
- meli 'tongue' < *me(l,n)e
- n-esi 'hair' < *iti[C] (n- is 1sg possessor)
- me(m) 'come' < *me-
- ket 'new' < *kVndak

Western Dani language:

- ap 'man' < *ambi
- (n)iti < *iti[C]
- meli 'tongue' < *me(l,n)e
- get 'new' < *kVndak
- okut 'leg' < *k(a,o)ndok[V]
- kat(lo) 'skin' < *(ŋg,k)a(nd,t)apu
- idu 'tree' < *inda

Ngalik language:

- idu(k)etu 'tree' < *inda
- (nak) amu 'breast' < *amu
- tokon 'full' < *tVkV[ti]
- kopu 'smoke' < *kambu
