= Silimo language =

Language in Indonesia

Silimo
- Wulik
- Region: Highlands of Irian Jaya
- Native speakers: (5,000 cited 1987)
- Language family: Trans–New Guinea: West Trans–New Guinea; Irian Highlands ?; Dani languages; Ngalik; Silimo

Language codes
- ISO 639-3: wul
- Glottolog: sili1249

Silimo, also Wulik or South Ngalik, is a Papuan language of the Indonesian New Guinea Highlands.
