= Honai =

Traditional Papuan house

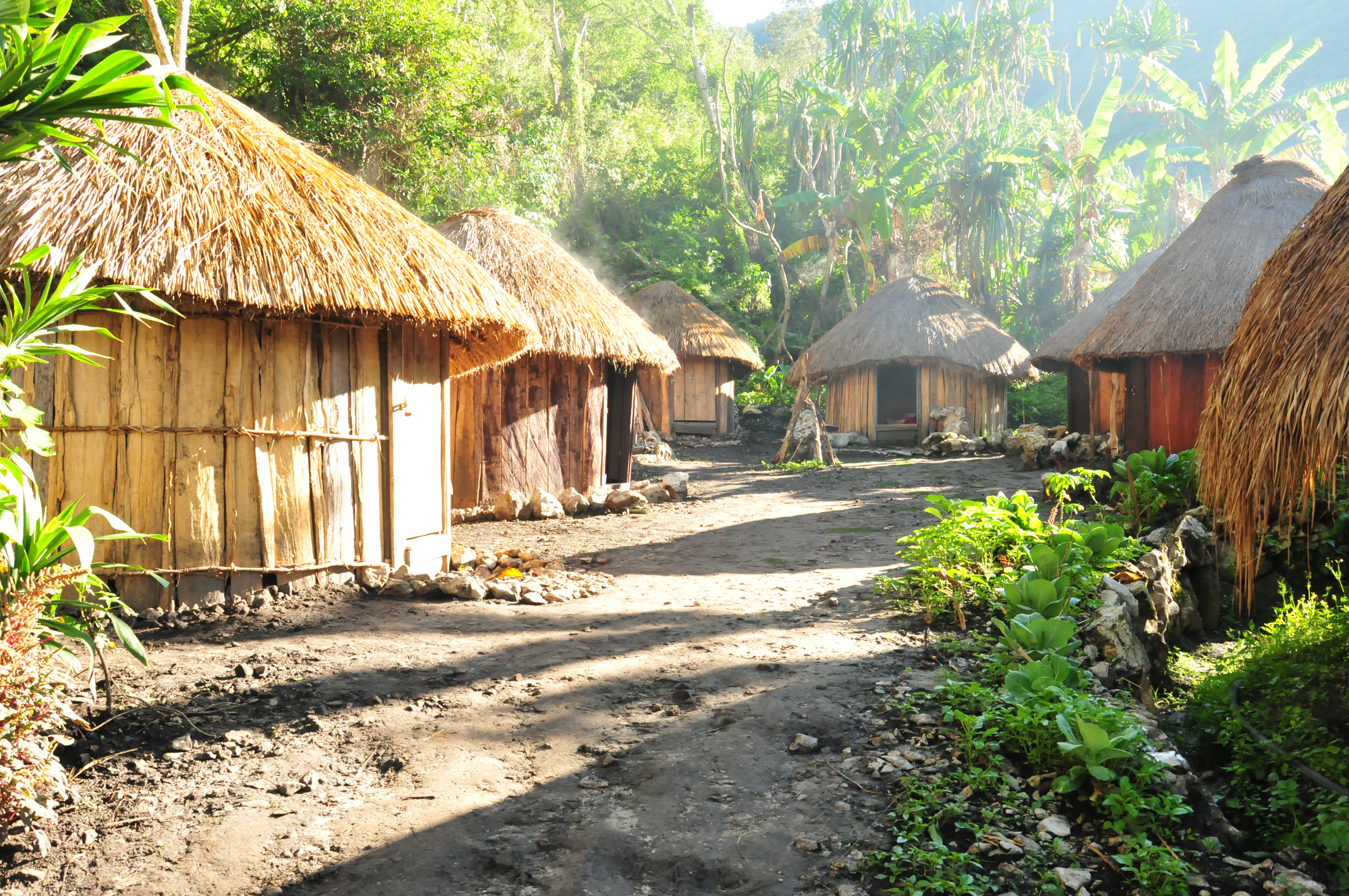
Honai Housing Complex

Honai is a traditional house of the people of the Central Papua and Highland Papua provinces, particularly the Dani. Honai has a simple, round-shaped structure with small doors and no windows. The height of the house is about 5-7 meters, and is divided into two parts: the lower floor and the upper floor. The lower floor is usually used for sleeping, while the upper floor is used for daily activities such as eating, relaxing, and crafting. In the middle of the lower floor, there is a hipere (hearth) used for cooking or warming the body.

Honai has a small structure that intends to provide warmth and ease its owners to move around. There are three types of honai: honai (for males), ebai (for females), and wamai (for animals). These three names originate from the base word "ai," which means house. Honai comes from the combination of the words "hun/hon," meaning male, ebai comes from the word ebe meaning female, and wamai comes from the word wam, meaning pig.

== History ==
In the past, Dani people did not live in residential houses but sought shelter under large trees. However, seeking shelter under large trees made them cold when it rained, especially if there was strong wind. One day, the Dani tribe observed birds making nests. These birds gathered branches and dry grasses and shaped them into a round form. From this observation, the Dani tribe was inspired to construct honai for their house.

== Functions and philosophy ==
Apart from being a residence, honai has several functions and philosophies. Firstly, honai serves as a place to store weapons and ancestral equipment. Additionally, in the honai, young boys are taught about war strategies. Secondly, the honai house is used as a storage space for tubers and agricultural produce. There are also honais designated for smoking mummies, which can be found in the Aikima in the Baliem Valley.

The philosophies contained within the honai are as follows:

1. Teaching strong unity and solidarity values among tribal members and preserving the cultural heritage inherited from ancestors.
2. By living in a honai, the inhabitants will have one heart, one mind, and one purpose in finishing tasks. It is reflected from the inception of the honai when someone wants to build it, they will call their family to help build the house and then have a meal together.

== Materials ==
Here are the materials needed to make a honai:

- Chopped boards. Those are boards that have pointed ends like spears. These pointed ends facilitate the process of nailing the boards into the ground. Later, these boards become the walls of the honai.
- Wooden beams. It serves as the main pillars supporting the roof of the honai.
- Fruitwood is used as the roof covering for the honai.
- Lokap/pinde, a small bamboo, is used for the floor.
- Cogongrass for honai's roof.
- Rattan rope or tree roots are used as bindings.

In the past, honai did not use nails, but now some houses do. Some changes have also occurred in honai houses. For example, honai now uses windows to improve air circulation. Furthermore, there are honai houses that use zinc for the roof.

== Gallery ==
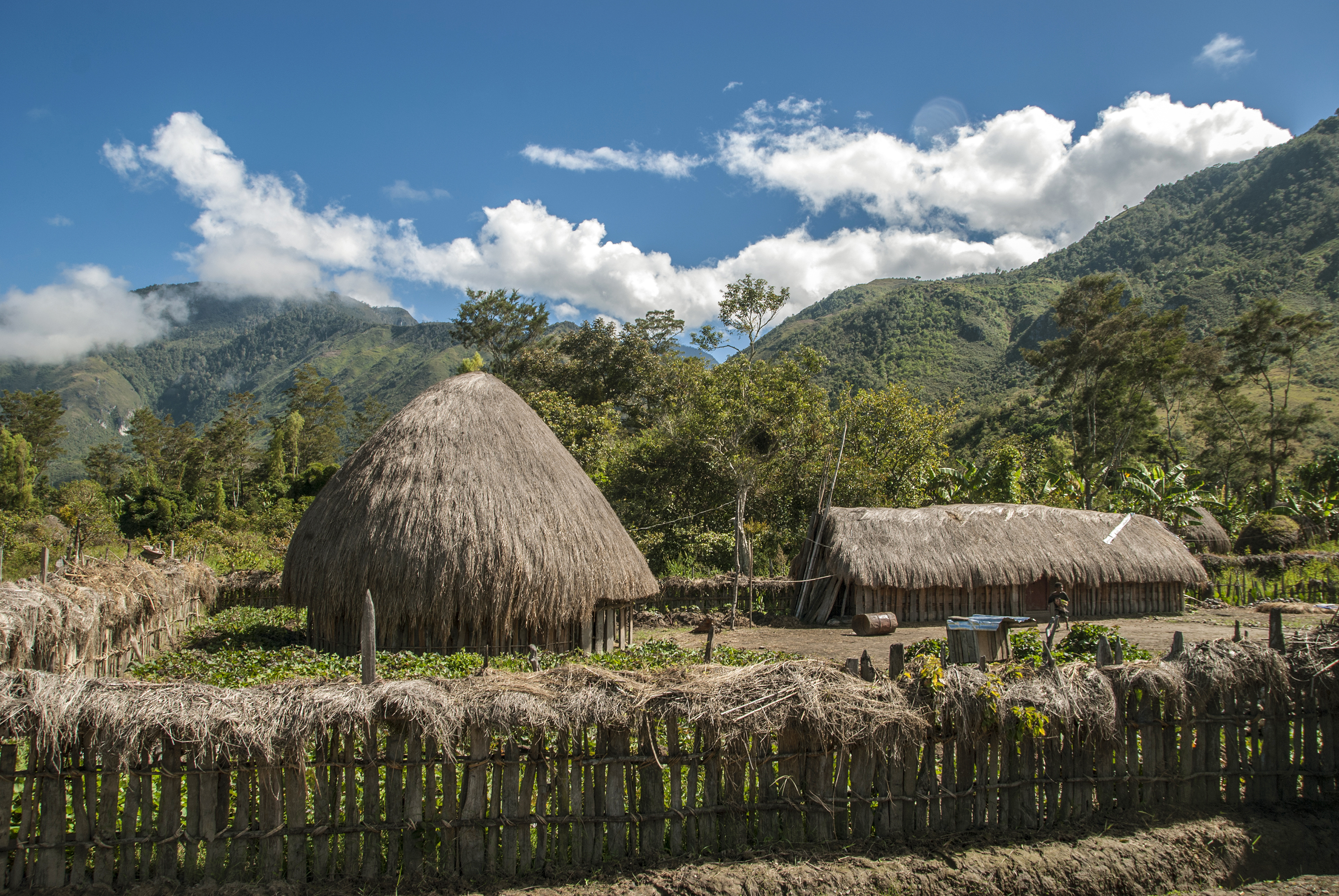
Honai (left) and Wamai/pigsty (right)

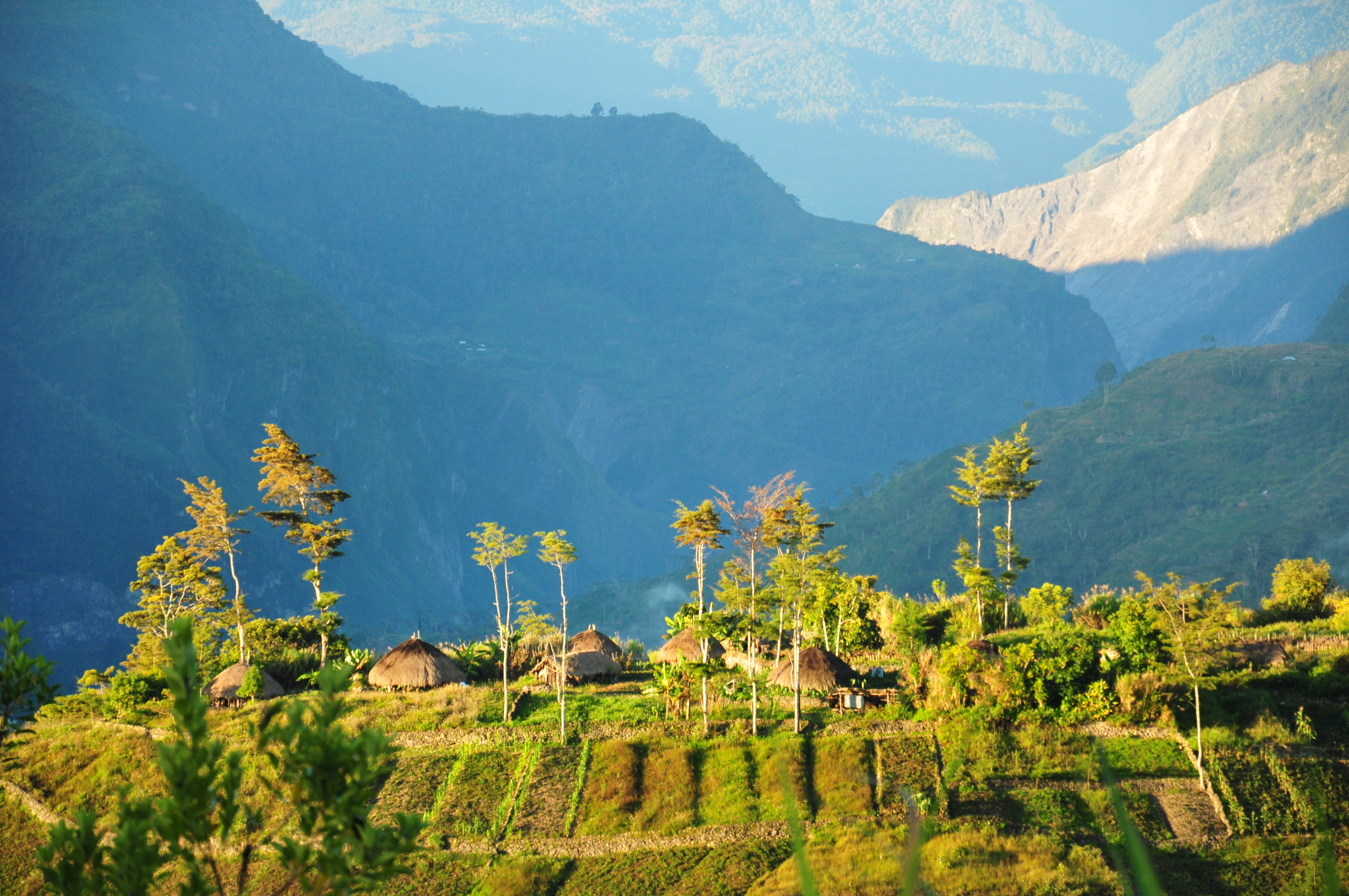
Silimo (honai complex) from a distance.

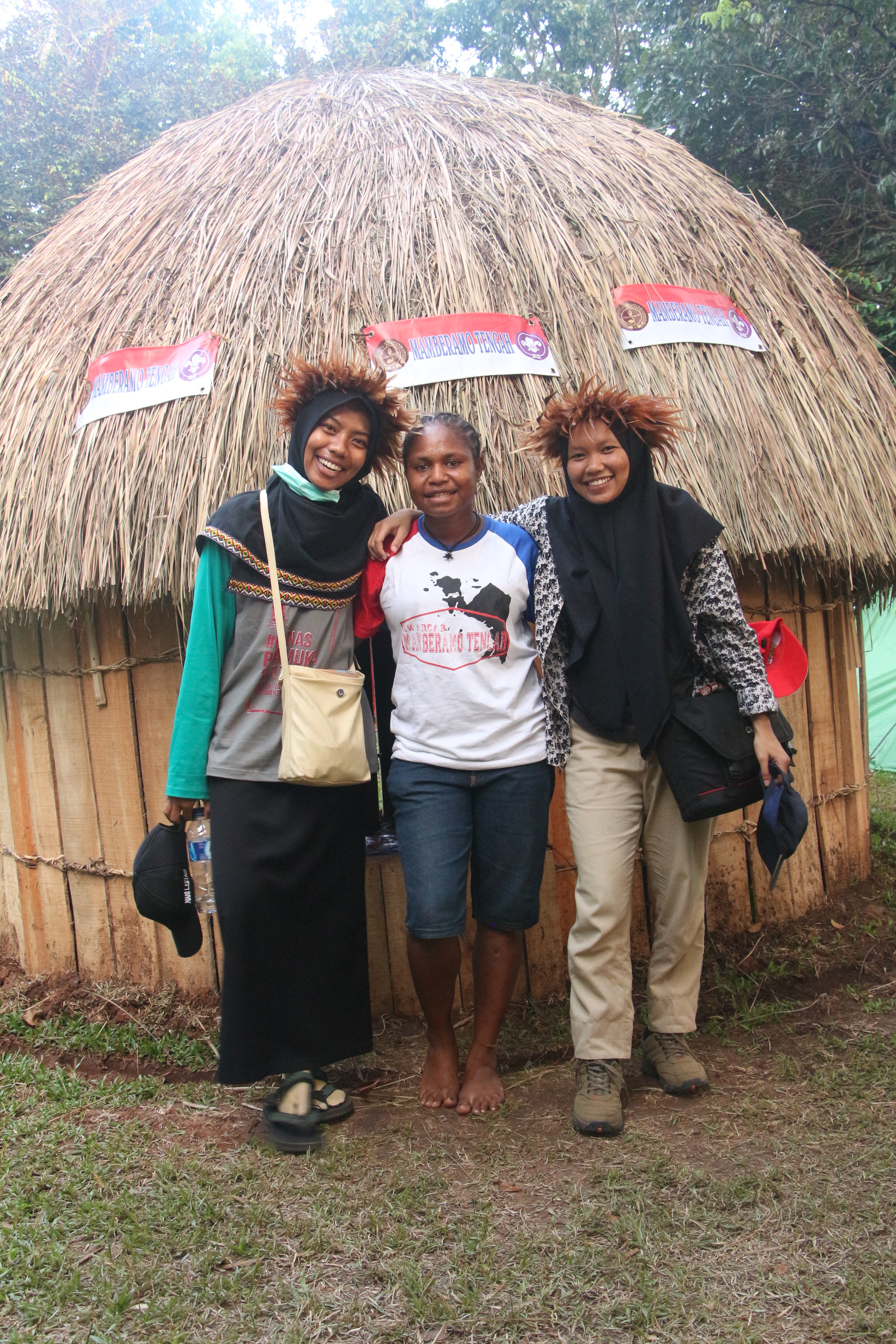
Two tourists taking a selfie in front of a honai.
