= Central New Guinea Expedition =

The Central New Guinea Expedition (1920–1922) was a Dutch scientific expedition which was seeking from the north coast of the island to reach snow-covered Wilhelminatop of the Central Plateau of Dutch New Guinea. The expedition was organized and financed by the Indies Committee for Scientific Investigations.

== Literature ==
- Bijlmer, H.J.T., 'Met de Centraal Nieuw-Guinee Expeditie A° 1920 naar een onbekende volksstam in het Hooggebergte', in: Tijdschrift van het Koninklijk Nederlands Aardrijkskundig Genootschap 39, 1922, pp. 156–183.
- Bijlmer, H.J.T., 'Met de Centraal Nieuw-Guinee-Expeditie, A° 1920, naar een onbekende volksstam in het Hooggebergte', in: De Aarde en haar Volken 59, 1923, pp. 97–109; 121-131; 145-155; 170-176: 193-204.
- Ploeg, Anton, "First Contact, in the Highlands of Irian Jaya", in: Journal of Pacific History 30, 1995, pp. 227–239.
- Wirz, P., Anthropologische und ethnologische Ergebnisse der Central Neu-Guinea Expedition 1921-1922 (Nova Guinea 16). Leiden: E.J. Brill, 1924.
- Wirz, P., Im Lande des Schneckengeldes; Erinnerungen und Erlebnisse einer Forschungsreise ins Innere von Holländisch Neu-Guinea. Frankfurt: Strecker und Schröder, 1932.
