= Baliem Valley =

Valley in western New Guinea

Coordinates: 4°01′19″S 138°53′46″E

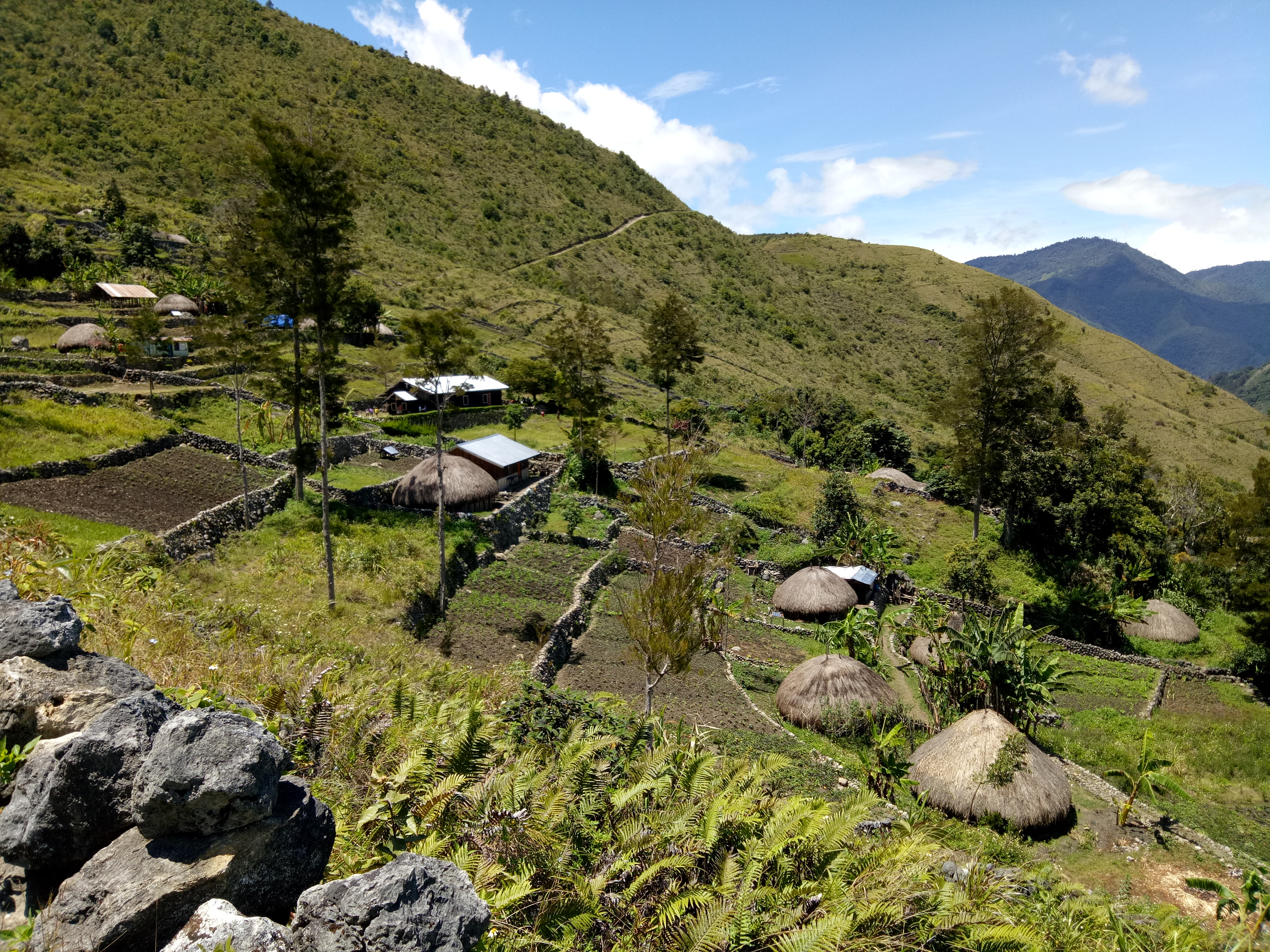
A village in Baliem Valley

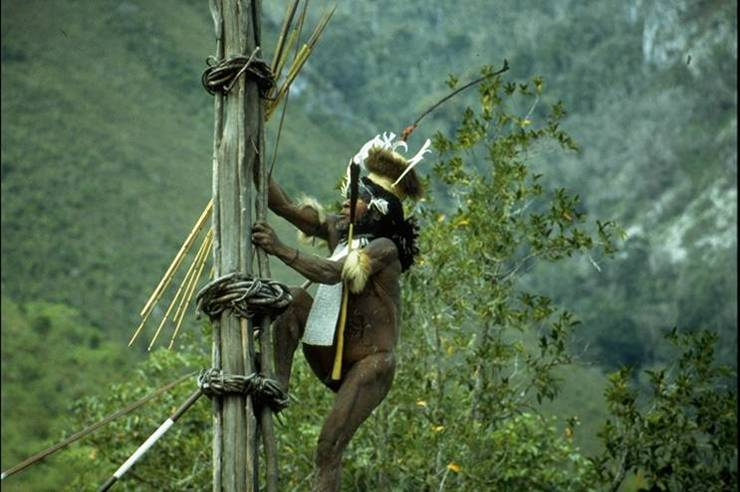
Yali Mabel, Anemaugi Village war chief in Kurulu District in the Baliem Valley

The Baliem Valley (Indonesian: Lembah Baliem; also spelled Balim and sometimes known as the Grand Valley) is a valley of the Central Highlands in Western New Guinea, specifically in the province of Highland Papua, Indonesia. The main town in the valley is Wamena, which lies on the Baliem River. The valley is about 80 km in length by 20 km in width and lies at an altitude of about 1,600–1,700 metres (5,200–5,600 ft), with a population of over 200,000.

The discovery of the Baliem Valley to the Western world and the unexpected presence of its large agricultural population was made by Richard Archbold’s third zoological expedition to New Guinea in 1938. On 21 June an aerial reconnaissance flight southwards from Hollandia (now Jayapura) found what the expedition called the "Grand Valley". Flights in later weeks described fenced villages of 3-50 houses, farm fields and drainage ditches. They landed on Lake Habbema 15 miles west. Teams of Dutch soldiers and Dayak people recruited from Borneo collected flora and fauna in the Baliem Valley, but did not know the language and killed one native without firing a warning shot. 10-15 villages formed a neighborhood, within an hour's walk. Several neighborhoods made a confederation, and several confederations made an alliance of 4,000-5,000 people, which was constantly fighting feuds to avenge previous deaths caused by members of other alliances, though all had the same culture, ethnicity and language.

The next known contact with the Western world was on May 13, 1945, when a US Army plane crashed in mountains next to the valley. The three survivors, Margaret Hastings, Kenneth Decker, John McCollom, and a rescue team of 11 paratroopers stayed in the valley until the end of June and traded visits with the people living there. There was no road access and no landing strip, so they stayed until the army arranged for a glider to land and be pulled out by an airplane which did not land.

Since then the valley has gradually been opened up to a limited amount of tourism, with Baliem Valley Festival (Festival Lembah Baliem) as a main tourist event.

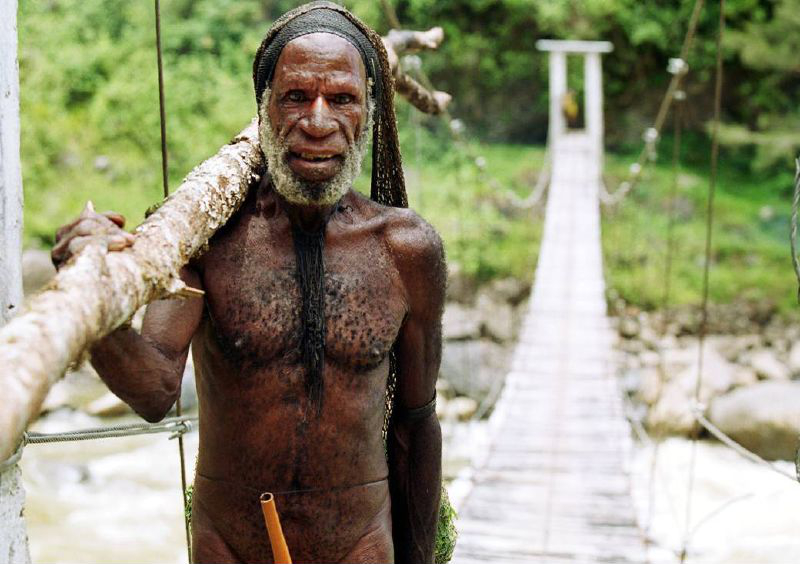
Yali tribesmen in the Baliem Valley

When Western anthropologists explored Baliem Valley in the 1940s and 1960s, they thought it was only populated by Dani people. However, further exploration to the east and south revealed that the valley was also inhabited by Yali people, Mek people, and Nduga people. During discussions by Dewan Adat Papua in 2002, it was decided that people living in Baliem Valley are called Hubula people, Walak people located to the north, and Lani people (Western Dani) located to the west.

The following is copied from the back cover of Peter Matthiessen’s book Under the Mountain Wall:

In the Baliem Valley in Central New Guinea live the Kurulu, a Stone Age tribe (Note: Kurulu is not a tribe but an alliance of Hubula people consisting of confederations (joined group of clans of wita and waya moiety groups) led by Kurulu Mabel or called Gutelu. His name is used as the name of the alliance and later the name of the district.) that survived into the twentieth century. Peter Matthiessen visited the Kurulu with the Harvard-Peabody Expedition in 1961 and wrote Under the Mountain Wall as an account not of the expedition, but of the great warrior Weaklekek, the swineherd Tukum, U-mue and his family, and the boy Weake, killed in a surprise raid. Matthiessen observes these people in their timeless rhythm of work and play and war, of gardening and wood gathering, feasts and funerals, pig stealing and ambush.

From 1977 to 1978 during the Papua conflict, the Indonesian Army launched a military campaign in the region, the campaign became known as the Baliem Valley massacre, due to the number of human rights abuses and attacks on civilians during the campaign. The campaign left at least 4,146 dead, although witness statements put the number higher at being over 26,000 dead.

== See also ==
- Baliem Valley languages
