= West Papuan Highlands languages =

Family of Trans-New Guinea languages

West Papuan Highlands
- Irian Highlands
- Geographic distribution: Highlands of Irian Jaya
- Linguistic classification: Trans–New Guinea: West Papuan Highlands
- Subdivisions: Dani; Paniai Lakes; Amung–Dem

Language codes
- ISO 639-3: –
- Glottolog: None
- Map: The Irian Highlands languages of New Guinea The Irian Highlands families Other Trans–New Guinea families Other Papuan languages Austronesian languages Uninhabited

The West Papuan Highland languages, also known as the Irian Highland languages, are a branch of the Trans–New Guinea language family proposed by Larson & Larson (1972) and confirmed by Timothy Usher. William A. Foley considers their Trans–New Guinea identity to be established.

- Dani (Balim Valley) family
- Paniai Lakes (Wissel Lakes) family
- Amung–Dem
  - Uhunduni (Amung, Damal)
  - Dem

== History ==
Capell linked the Dani languages to Kwerba in 1962, a position followed by Wurm, who included Dani-Kwerba and the Wissel Lakes (Paniai Lakes) languages as branches of Trans–New Guinea. Larson & Larson (1972) proposed that the Dani and Paniai Lakes families, along with the Amung and Dem isolates, grouped together within TNG. Ross (2005) suggests a possible link between Dani and Paniai with his West TNG proposal. Usher confirms Larson & Larson and finds that the Amung and Dem languages are closest to each other.
