= Fibula (penile) =

Ring fastened to the human penis

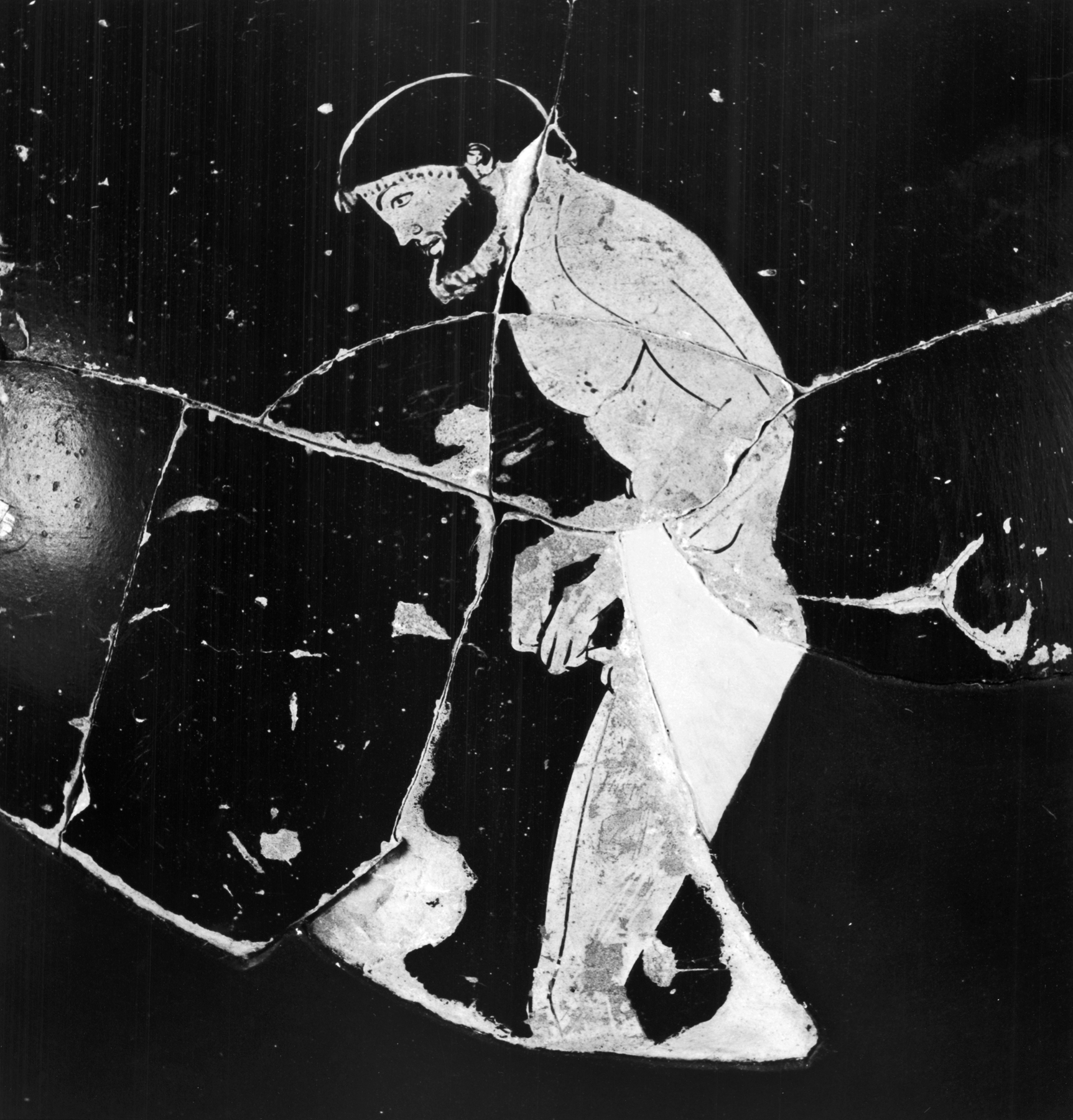
Athlete infibulating himself (psykter by the Syriskos Painter, c. 480 BC)

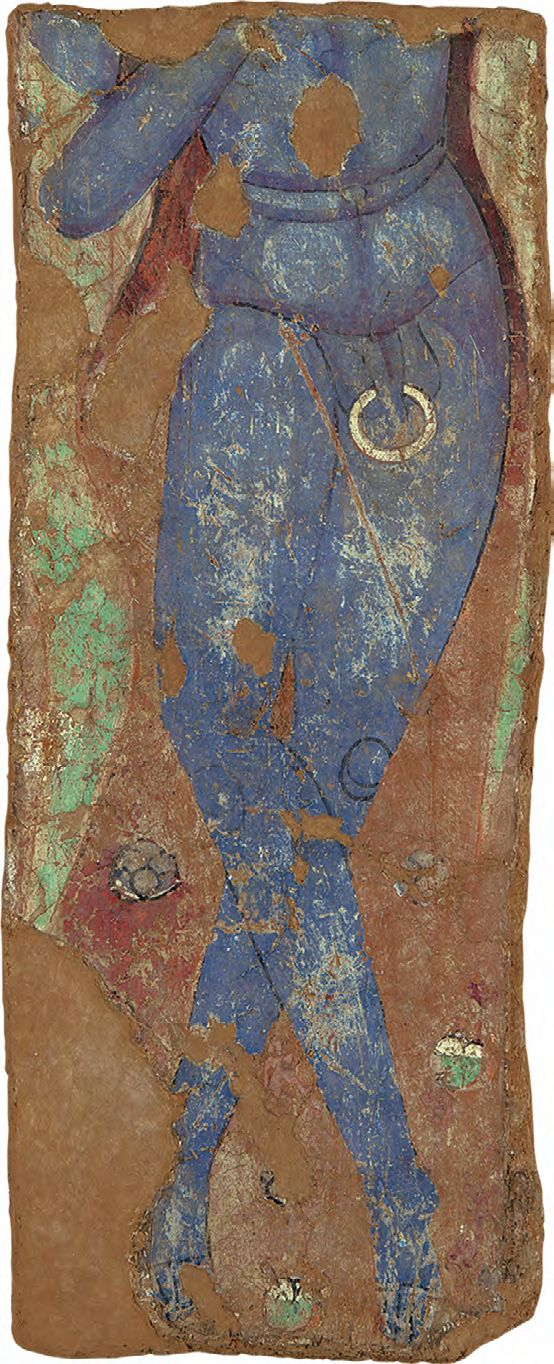
Mural from Cave 198, Kizil Caves, 6th century CE

A penile fibula is foremost a ring, attached with a pin through the foreskin to fasten it above the glans penis. It was mainly used by ancient Roman culture, though it may have originated earlier. This ring type of fibula has been described akin to a "large modern safety pin". Its usage may have had several reasons, for example to avoid intercourse, to promote modesty or the belief that it helped preserve a man's voice. Some Jews also utilized fibulas to hide that they were circumcised. The word fibula could also be used in general in Rome to denote any type of covering of the penis (such as with a sheath) for the sake of voice preservation or sexual abstinence; it was often used by masters on their slaves for this purpose. Fibulas were frequent subject of ridicule among satirists in Rome.

Infibulation could be also a surgical procedure in which two holes were pierced in the foreskin, so a metal clasp could be locked on them to close the prepuce shut. This procedure was similarly criticized by Celsus.

== See also ==
- Boxer at Rest, a Hellenistic Greek sculpture showing infibulation
- Kynodesme, a cord tied around the end of the foreskin to secure the penis
- Koteka, a type of penis sheath
- Foreskin restoration, also known as Epispasm in historical documents.
