= Gabriele Tinti (poet) =

Italian poet and writer (born 1979)

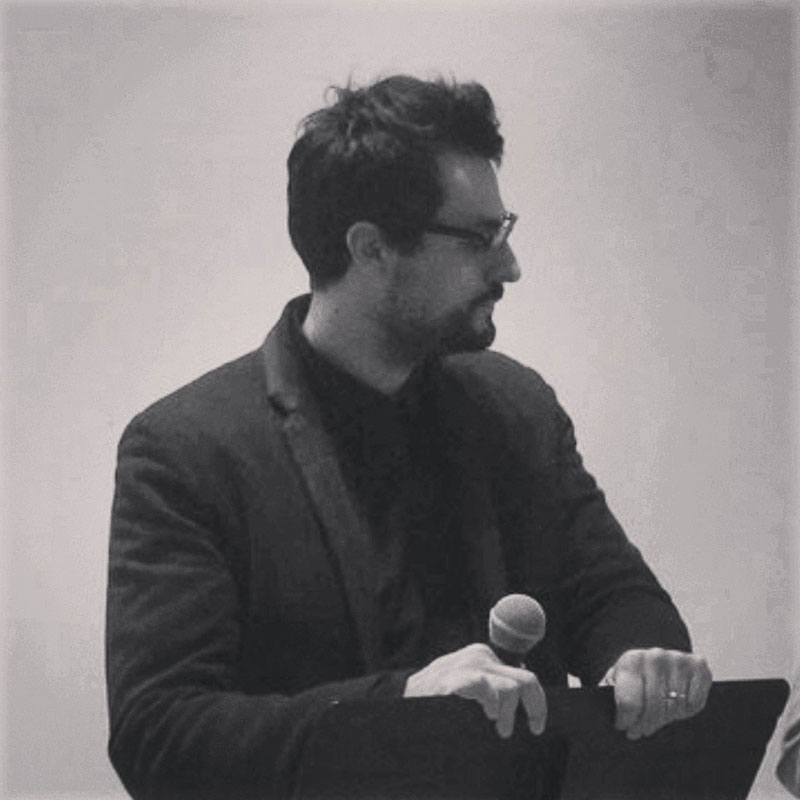
- Gabriele Tinti at Queens Museum of Art in 2013
- Born: 18 December 1979 (age 46); Jesi, Italy
- Occupations: Poet, writer
- Website: gabrieletinti.com

Gabriele Tinti (born 18 December 1979 in Jesi, Italy) is an Italian poet and writer.

== Career ==
Gabriele Tinti has worked with the J. Paul Getty Museum, the Metropolitan Museum of Art, the British Museum, the Los Angeles County Museum of Art, the National Roman Museum, the Capitoline Museums, The Ara Pacis, the National Archaeological Museum, Naples and the Glyptothek of Munich composing poems for ancient works of art including the Boxer at Rest, the Discobolus, Arundel Head, the Ludovisi Gaul, the Victorious Youth, the Farnese Hercules, the Hercules by Scopas, the Elgin Marbles from the Parthenon, the Barberini Faun, the Doryphoros and many other masterpieces.

His works have been the object of readings and performances in front of the works of art that inspired them.

2014 marked his first work with Franco Nero, who then several times read Tinti's poems inspired by the collections in the National Roman Museum and the Capitoline Museums.

In 2015 Robert Davi read Tinti's poem the Boxer at Rest at the J. Paul Getty Museum in Los Angeles, and in subsequent years at the Los Angeles County Museum of Art, again at the J. Paul Getty Museum and in a series of videos for the Treccani, Italian Encyclopaedia of Science, Letters, and Arts.

In 2016 the actor Joe Mantegna read some poems inspired by the figure of Heracles at the Los Angeles County Museum of Art.

From 2016 to 2018 he composed some poems inspired by Giorgio de Chirico's masterpieces with mythological subjects. His works have been read at the Metropolitan Museum of Art and the Peggy Guggenheim Collection by the actor Burt Young, at the Museum of Modern Art in New York by the actor Vincent Piazza and at the Museo del Novecento in Milan by Alessandro Haber.

In 2018 his ekphrastic poetry project 'Ruins' was awarded the Premio Montale with a ceremony at the National Roman Museum in Palazzo Altemps.

In the same year he extended his poetic work inspired by masterpieces of art to Renaissance painting, with a reading at the Pinacoteca di Brera and the Galleria di Palazzo Spinola, working again with the actor Alessandro Haber.

In 2019 he was involved in a series of readings at the Capitoline Museums, the National Roman Museum, the J. Paul Getty Museum and the Los Angeles County Museum of Art in Los Angeles with Marton Csokas, Robert Davi and Jamie McShane.

In February 2020 he returned to the British Museum for a reading inspired by the Trojan heroes on the occasion of the "Troy Myth and Reality" exhibition.

On World Poetry Day, 21 March 2020, the National Roman Museum presented the first poetic audio guide for the museum written by Tinti with readings by Marton Csokas, Alessandro Haber, Franco Nero and Kevin Spacey.

In 2020 the Parco Archeologico Colosseo commissioned him to write a series of pieces evoking the statues once present in the Roman Forum, the Colosseum and the Domus Aurea. His poems were read by Alessandro Haber, Michele Placido, Robert Davi, Stephen Fry, James Cosmo, Marton Csokas, Abel Ferrara and Franco Nero.

His work with Abel Ferrara began in 2020 with a reading inspired by the "Ludovisi Gaul", continued in February 2021 at the Pinacoteca di Brera with a reading inspired by the "Christ at the Column" by Donato Bramante and developed in May 2021 at the Cappella Sansevero with a dramatic reading inspired by the Veiled Christ, culminating in recent performances in front of "The Mocking of Christ" by Beato Angelico at the Museo San Marco in Florence and Andrea Mantegna's "Ecce Homo" at the Musée Jacquemart-André in Paris.

Abel Ferrara also has an excerpt of Tinti's poem inspired by Christ at the Column read to Ethan Hawke in the 2021 film Zeros and Ones. In the same year, the 'Ruins' project was compiled into a book by Eris Pres (London) and Libri Scheiwiller (Milan).

Notable addresses of Tinti's work include those by literary critics, archeologists, philosophers, poets such as Kenneth Goldsmith, Andrew Stewart, Kenneth Lapatin, Lynda Nead, Nigel Spivey, Umberto Curi, Derrick de Kerckhove.

== Collaborations ==
His poems have been performed by actors like Joe Mantegna, Michael Imperioli, Burt Young, Alessandro Haber, Robert Davi, Vincent Piazza, Marton Csokas and Franco Nero.

In 2019 he worked with the two time Oscar winner Kevin Spacey. After having returned to the stage with the video ‘Let me be Frank’, which attracted millions of views, on 2 August Spacey read four of Tinti's poems inspired by the Boxer at Rest in front of a large crowd that gathered at the National Roman Museum in Palazzo Massimo, where the statue is located. The official video was released the next day on Tinti's YouTube channel.

During the COVID-19 pandemic, in association with the Capitoline Museums, the National Roman Museum and the Ministry of Cultural Heritage and Activities (Italy), he launched a series of virtual events inspired by epigraphs collected in the museums working with Malcolm McDowell, Marton Csokas, Robert Davi and Franco Nero.

When the National Roman Museum reopened after the COVID-19 pandemic Tinti worked with Abel Ferrara, who read his dramatic works inspired by the Ludovisi Gaul, a Roman marble group depicting a Gallic man in the act of plunging a sword into his breast.

== Writing ==
His work focuses on the subject of death and suffering and is mainly composed in the form of lucid and epigrammatic poetry. The humanity sung in his writings is the dramatic life of boxers, suicides, defeated heroes and the disabled.

In 2016 he published Last words (Skira Rizzoli) a collection of found poetry in association with Andres Serrano.

His work has been inspired by the Greek lyric poets Archilochus and Theocritus, the Romantics Percy Bysshe Shelley and John Keats and the Russian poets Sergei Yesenin and Alexander Alexandrovich Blok.

== Controversy ==
In an interview in The Washington Post, regarding his work with Kevin Spacey, he said that: "I have always taken the side of the scapegoat (…) I believe that Me Too movement is becoming a violent witch hunt. Spacey, like others, has the right to the presumption of innocence and I cannot in any way support the preventative exclusion and annihilation of a man, woman or work".

His work with Abel Ferrara took place at a time when sculptures were being pulled down all over the world. After the performance Tinti said to la Repubblica: "Sculptures have a voice to be responded to or embodied, but through poetry, not violence".

== List of works ==
=== Books ===
- The Boxer. New York: Eris Press. 2026. ISBN 978-1-971559-07-0 (Poetry)
- Hungry Ghosts. New York: Eris Press. 2025. ISBN 9781916809741. (Poetry)
- Confessions. New York: Eris Press. 2023. ISBN 9781912475742. (Poetry)
- Bleedings. New York: Contra Mundum Press. 2023. ISBN 978-1-940625-60-7. (Poetry)
- Ruins. New York: Eris Press. 2021. ISBN 9781912475278. (Poetry)
- The Earth Will Come To Laugh and Feast. New York: powerHouse Books. 2020. ISBN 9781576879481. (Poetry)
- Last words. Milano - New York: Skira Rizzoli. 2016. ISBN 9788857229874. (Poetry)
- All over (Mimesis edizioni ed.). Milano: Mimesis Publishing. 2013. ISBN 9788857519357. (Poetry)
- The Way of the Cross. Turin-London-Venice-New York: Allemandi&C. 2011. ISBN 9788842220923. (Poetry)

=== Readings and poetry videos ===
Selected videos and readings of his poetry:

- 2025 Judas, Brera, Ministry of Cultural Heritage and Activities (Italy), read by Willem Dafoe
- 2024 Confessions, Pantheon, Ministry of Cultural Heritage and Activities (Italy), read by Willem Dafoe
- 2022 Icarus, Rai, read by Abel Ferrara
- 2022 Prometheus, Rai, read by Abel Ferrara
- 2022 Christ Mocked, Rai, read by Abel Ferrara
- 2021 Bleedings, Rai, read by Abel Ferrara
- 2020 Boxer at Rest, Ministry of Cultural Heritage and Activities (Italy), read by Franco Nero.
- 2019 The boxer, National Roman Museum, read by Kevin Spacey
- 2019 Hermes, Treccani, Los Angeles County Museum of Art, read by Robert Davi
- 2016 Hercules, Los Angeles County Museum of Art read by Joe Mantegna
- 2015 The boxer– Part I & II, J. Paul Getty Museum, read by Robert Davi

== See also ==
- Andres Serrano
- Kevin Spacey
- Abel Ferrara
- Found poetry
- Ekphrasis
- Lyric Poetry
