= Infibulation =

Ritual removal of the vulva

Type III illustrates infibulation

Infibulation is the non-medical removal (mutilation) of the vulva and its suturing, a practice found mainly in northeastern Africa, particularly in Djibouti, Eritrea, Ethiopia, Kenya, Somalia, and Sudan. The World Health Organization refers to the procedure as Type III female genital mutilation.

The term can also refer to the entirely different practice of placing a clasp through the foreskin in men; for more information see the article Fibula (penile).

== Female ==
The World Health Organization refers to female infibulation as Type III female genital mutilation. Often called "pharaonic circumcision" (or farooni) in countries where it is practiced. It refers to the removal of the inner and outer labia and the suturing of the vulva. It is usually accompanied by the removal of the clitoral glans. The practice is concentrated in Djibouti, Eritrea, Ethiopia, Somalia, and Sudan. During a 2014 survey in Sudan, over 80 percent of those who had experienced any form of FGM had been sewn closed.

The procedure leaves a wall of skin and flesh across the vagina and the rest of the pubic area. By inserting a twig or similar object before the wound heals, a small hole is created for the passage of urine and menstrual blood. The legs are bound together for two to four weeks to allow healing.

The vagina is usually penetrated at the time of a woman's marriage by her husband's penis, or by cutting the tissue with a knife. The vagina is opened further for childbirth and usually closed again afterwards, a process known as defibulation (or deinfibulation) and reinfibulation. Infibulation can cause chronic pain and infection, organ damage, prolonged micturition, urinary incontinence, inability to get pregnant, difficulty giving birth, obstetric fistula, and fatal bleeding.

== Male ==
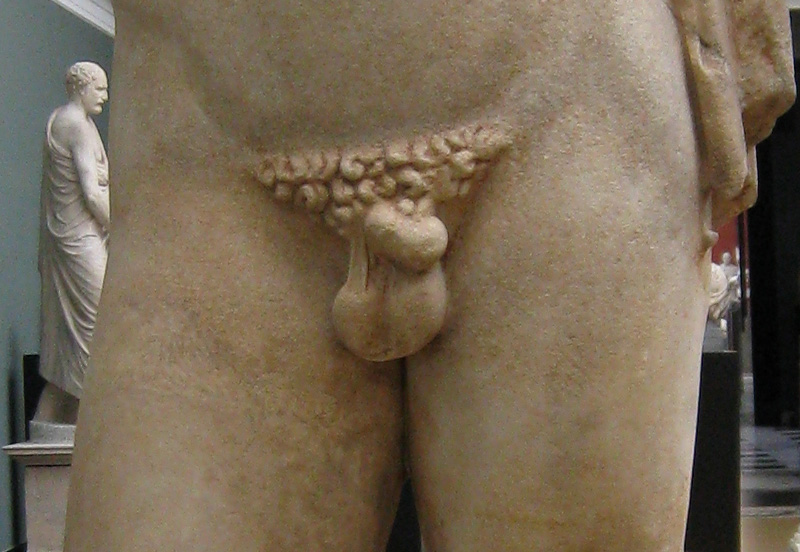
A marble statue of the Greek poet Anacreon (582–485 BCE), showing kynodesmē

Infibulation also referred to placing a clasp through the male foreskin. In ancient Greece, male athletes, singers and other public performers used a clasp or string to close the foreskin and draw the penis over to one side, a practice known as kynodesmē (literally "dog tie"). Many kynodesmē are depicted on vases, almost exclusively confined to symposiasts and komasts, who are as a general rule older (or at least mature) men. In Rome, a fibula was often a type of ring used similarly to a kynodesme.

Kynodesmē was seen as a sign of restraint and abstinence, but was also related to concerns of modesty; in artistic representations, it was regarded as obscene and offensive to show a long penis and the glans penis in particular. Tying up the penis with a string was a way of avoiding what was seen as the shameful and dishonorable spectacle of an exposed glans penis, something associated with those without repute, such as slaves and barbarians. It therefore conveyed the moral worth and modesty of the subject.
