= Willy warmer =

Novelty garment designed to fit over the penis

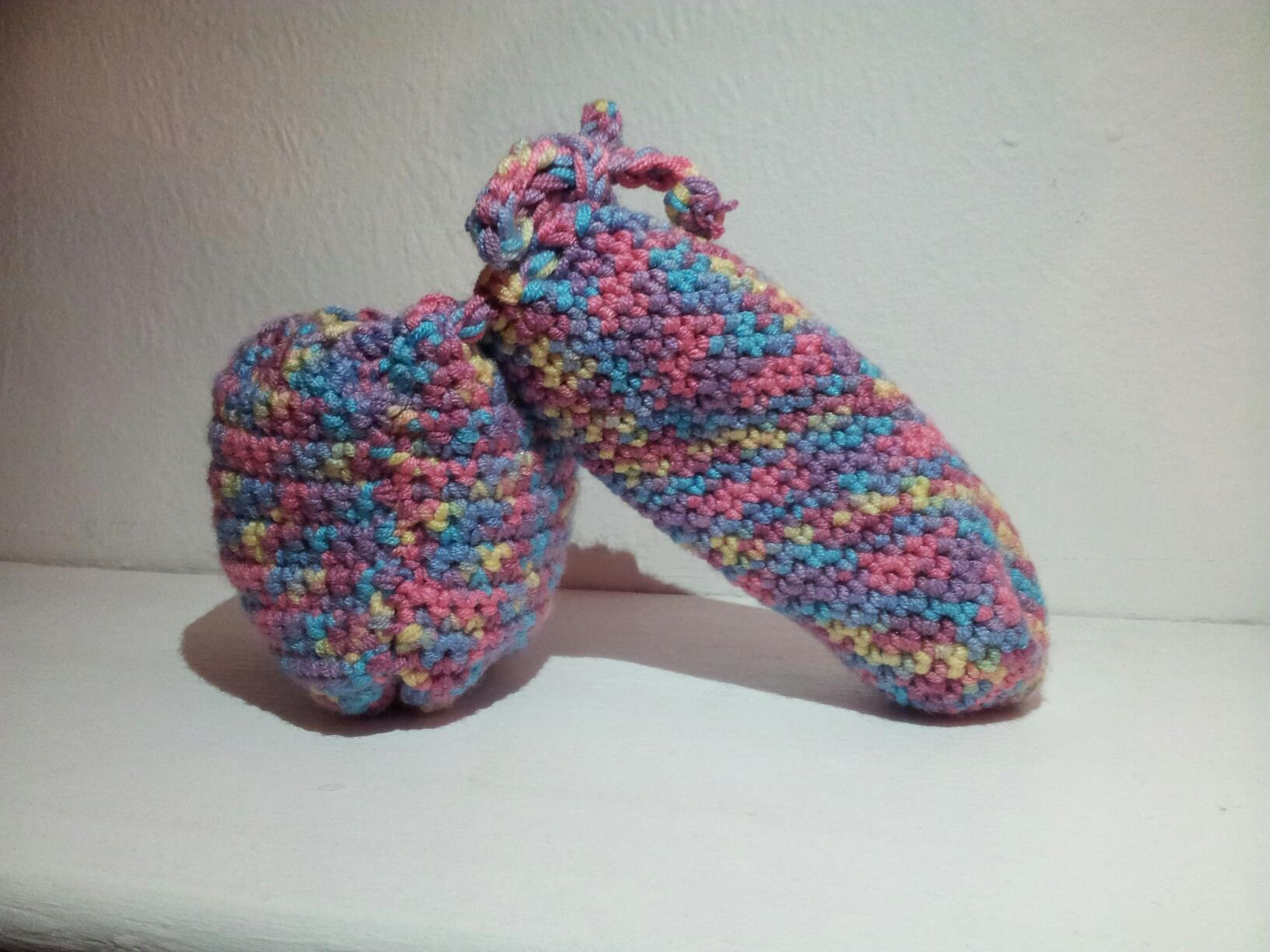
Crocheted willy warmer with drawstring

A willy warmer (or cock sock) is a novelty garment designed to fit over the penis.

== History ==
According to the Croatian knitter Radmila Kus, knitted protector (nakurnjak) was traditionally worn by Croatian men, particularly in the Mrkopalj mountain region, as a guard against frostbite. Such garments were also worn in Norway, where they were called forhyse, vænakot, or suspensorium. Several examples are preserved in the Norwegian Museum of Cultural History. Sometimes in Norway they would be made from squirrel fur with the fur side inside, to be worn under leather trousers in the winter. On the Faroe Islands such garments are called kallvøttur (man mitten) or purrivøttur (testicles mitten). There was a tradition in Norway and Denmark, particularly on the Faroe Islands, where a girl would present her boyfriend with a forhyse to see how seriously he took their relationship. If the gift was rejected, this was seen as evidence that he was not yet ready for marriage.

== In modern culture ==
Since the 20th century, willy warmers are usually made as novelties and joke gifts rather than to serve a functional purpose. In 1939, while filming Gone with the Wind, Clark Gable received a present of a hand-knitted genitalia warmer from Carole Lombard. In the 1950s, Joan Crawford knitted a "cock sock" as a parting present for Porfirio Rubirosa.

Dawn Steel, while working as a merchandiser for Penthouse in the early 1970s, found hand-knitted "cock socks" in Frankfurt, and subsequently secured the rights to market "extra large" red, blue and white versions through the magazine. By the early 1980s, the seaside resort Blackpool had willy warmers displayed alongside other merchandise in gift shops just outside the Pleasure Beach, where they were seen as reflecting the limit of sexually suggestive material which was considered permissible to display publicly. It was claimed in 1991 that King Charles III, received a green knitted warmer one Christmas, which was stored with other unusual gifts in the cellar at Highgrove House.

In male nude photography, as published in magazines such as Playgirl, cock socks have become a humorous substitute for the fig leaf, deliberately focusing attention upon the area concealed. In 1990–91, during the Gulf War, the British tabloid newspaper The Sun printed a pattern for a willy warmer, which it encouraged female readers to knit and send to soldiers in the Gulf. Early 21st century willy warmers are often made to represent religious or political themes, or in the form of animals. For example, in 2004 Ann Summers offered a horse's head design with a neighing speaker. British reality TV star Bobby-Cole Norris has repeatedly made headlines for his choice of willy warmers as swimwear, including both a simple pouch and an anatomically correct variety.

== See also ==
- Codpiece
- Koteka
