= Boxer at Rest =

Hellenistic Greek bronze sculpture

- Terme Boxer, Boxer of the Quirinal
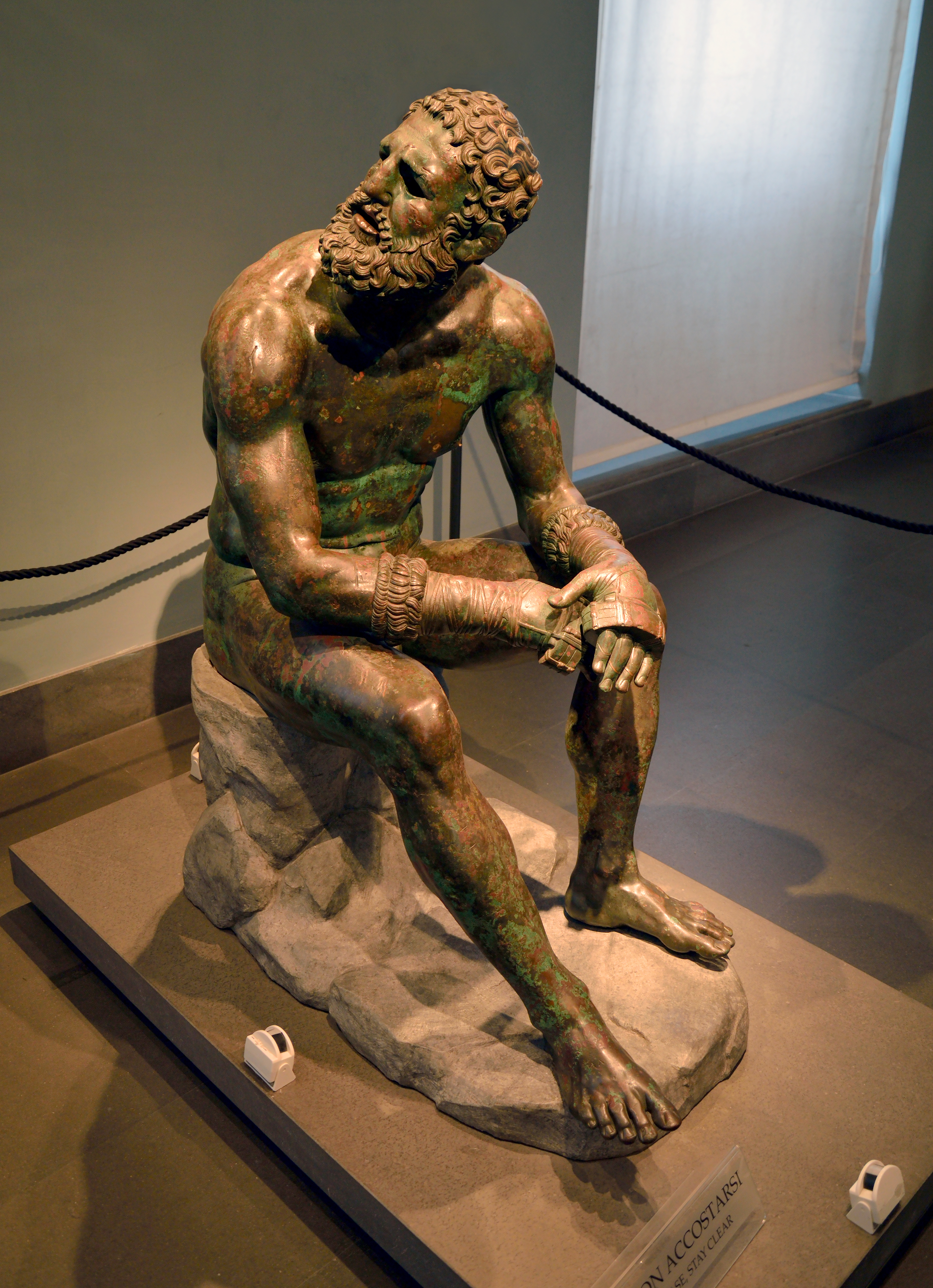
- Year: c. 330—50 BCE
- Medium: Bronze statue
- Location: Palazzo Massimo alle Terme, Rome, Italy

Boxer at Rest, also known as the Terme Boxer, Seated Boxer, Defeated Boxer, or Boxer of the Quirinal, is an original Hellenistic bronze sculpture depicting a seated nude boxer at rest, possibly Theagenes of Thasos, still wearing his himantes (Ancient Greek: ἱμάντες, romanized: himántes, plural of ἱμάς, himás, 'a leathern strap or thong'), a type of leather hand-wrap. It has been given various dates within the period of c. 330—50 BC. It was excavated in Rome in 1885, and is now in the collection of the Museo Nazionale Romano and displayed in the Palazzo Massimo alle Terme.

Boxer at Rest is one of the finest examples of bronze sculptures to have survived from the ancient world; survivals from the period are rare, as they were easily melted down and transformed into new objects. The work comes from a period in Greek art where there is a movement away from idealized heroic depictions of the body and youth, and an exploration of emotional as well as psychological themes and greater realism. These traits are typical of Hellenistic art and thoroughly displayed in this sculpture, making it a hallmark of the Hellenistic style.

== Discovery ==
The Boxer is one of two unrelated bronzes (the other being the unidentified Hellenistic Prince) discovered on the slopes of the Quirinal within a month of each other in 1885, possibly from the remains of the Baths of Constantine. It appears that both had been carefully buried in antiquity. The archaeologist Rodolfo Lanciani, who was present at the sculpture's discovery, wrote:

I have witnessed, in my long career in the active field of archaeology, many discoveries; I have experienced surprise after surprise; I have sometimes and most unexpectedly met with real masterpieces; but I have never felt such an extraordinary impression as the one created by the sight of this magnificent specimen of a semi-barbaric athlete, coming slowly out of the ground, as if awakening from a long repose after his gallant fights.

— Rodolfo Lanciani, Ancient Rome in the Light of Recent Discoveries (1890), p. 305-306

== Description and interpretation ==
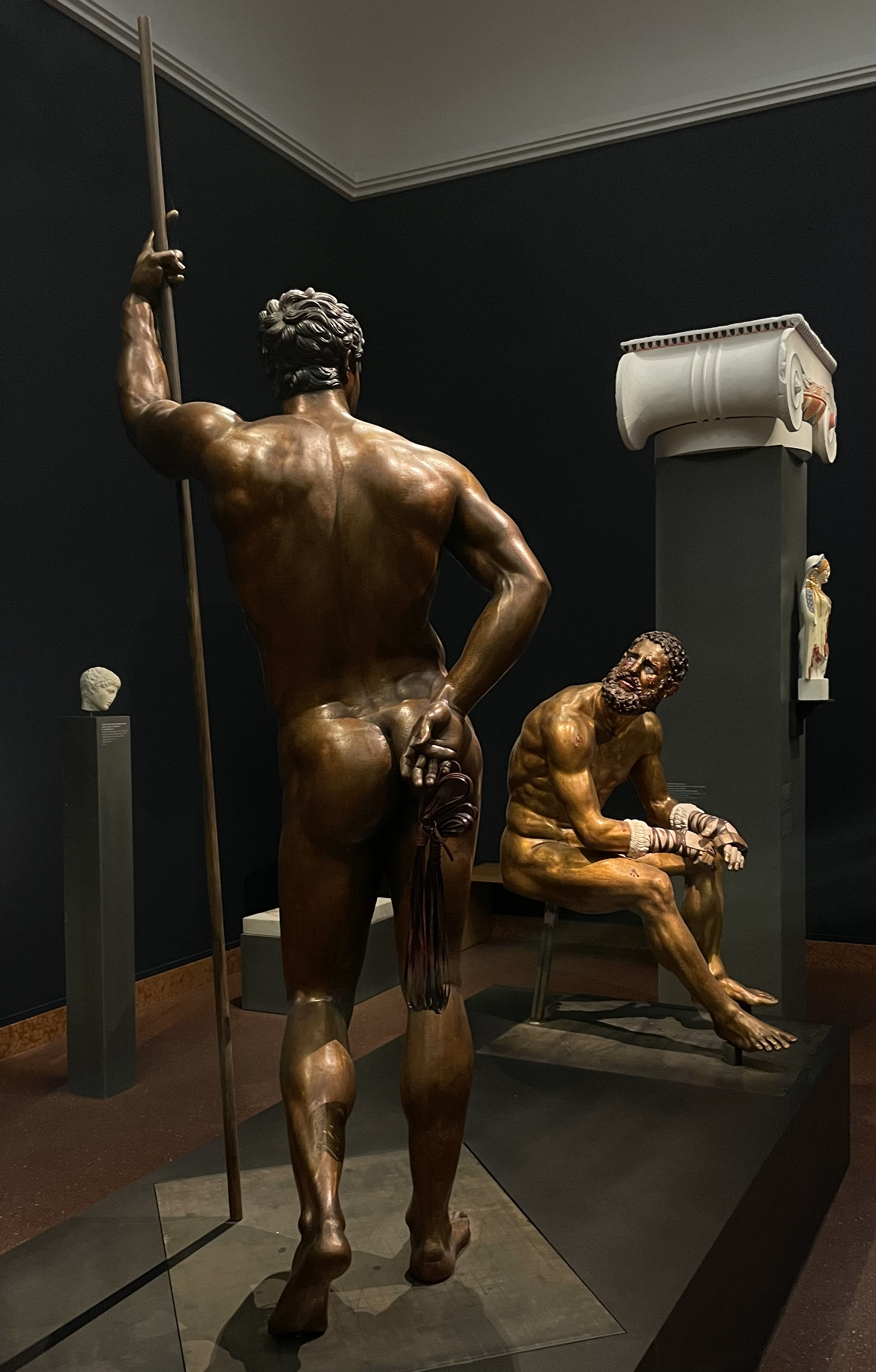
Experimental color reconstruction of the bronze statues from the Quirinal, Liebieghaus Polychromy Research Project (Brinkmann & Koch-Brinkmann)

The statue is a masterpiece of Hellenistic athletic professionalism, with a top-heavy over-muscled torso and scarred and bruised face, penis bound by a kynodesme, cauliflower ears, broken nose, Morton's toe and a mouth suggesting broken teeth. The boxer was also depicted as bearded, which would have been a typical characteristic of ancient boxers. R. R. R. Smith, the classicist, believes that the statue does not show a true portrait but is instead genre realism, a generic character of "boxer". A 2018 reconstruction project executed by the Frankfurt Liebieghaus Polychromy Research Project and headed by Vinzenz Brinkmann follows the interpretation of Otto Rossbach (1898) and Phyllis L. Williams (1945) and identifies the statue as Amykos, King of the Bebryces.

In 1989, both bronzes were meticulously conserved by Nikolaus Himmelmann, in preparation for their exhibition at the Akademisches Kunstmuseum in Bonn. The sculpture is soldered together from eight segments, separately cast through the lost-wax process; the joins have been filed and finished to be virtually invisible. The lips and wounds and scars about the face were originally inlaid with copper, and further copper inlays on the right shoulder, forearm, caestus and thigh represented drops and trickles of blood. The fingers and toes were worn from being rubbed by passers-by in ancient times, which has suggested that the Boxer was carefully buried to preserve its talismanic value, when the Baths were abandoned after the Goths cut the aqueducts that fed them. These baths remained mostly unused until the 6th and 7th century when pilgrims being treated nearby in the Xenodochium of Santi Nereo ed Achilleo were buried at the location of the baths.

The statue was displayed in the United States for the first time from June to July 2013 at the Metropolitan Museum of Art in New York City as part of the "Year of Italian Culture in the United States".

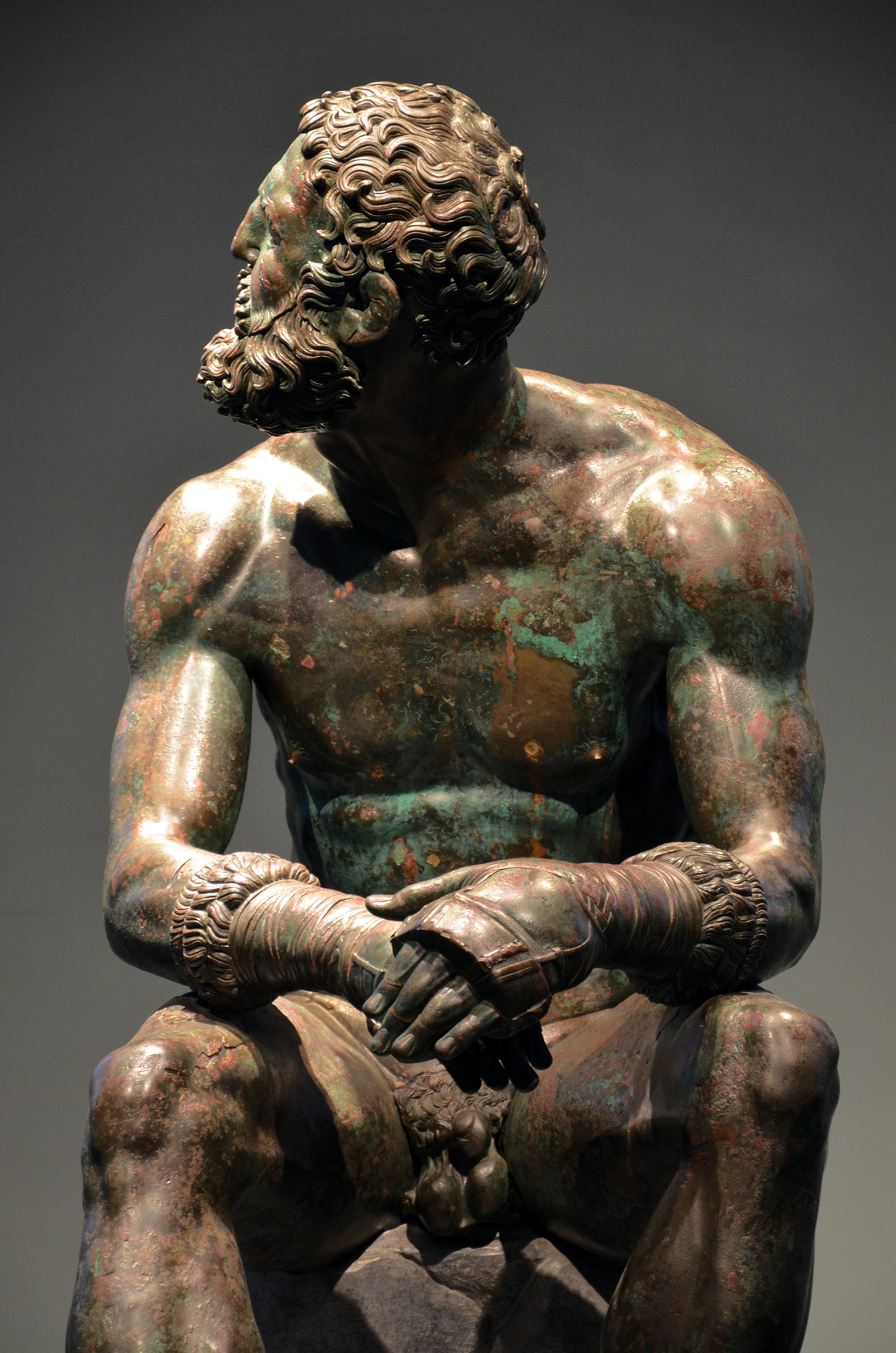
Front

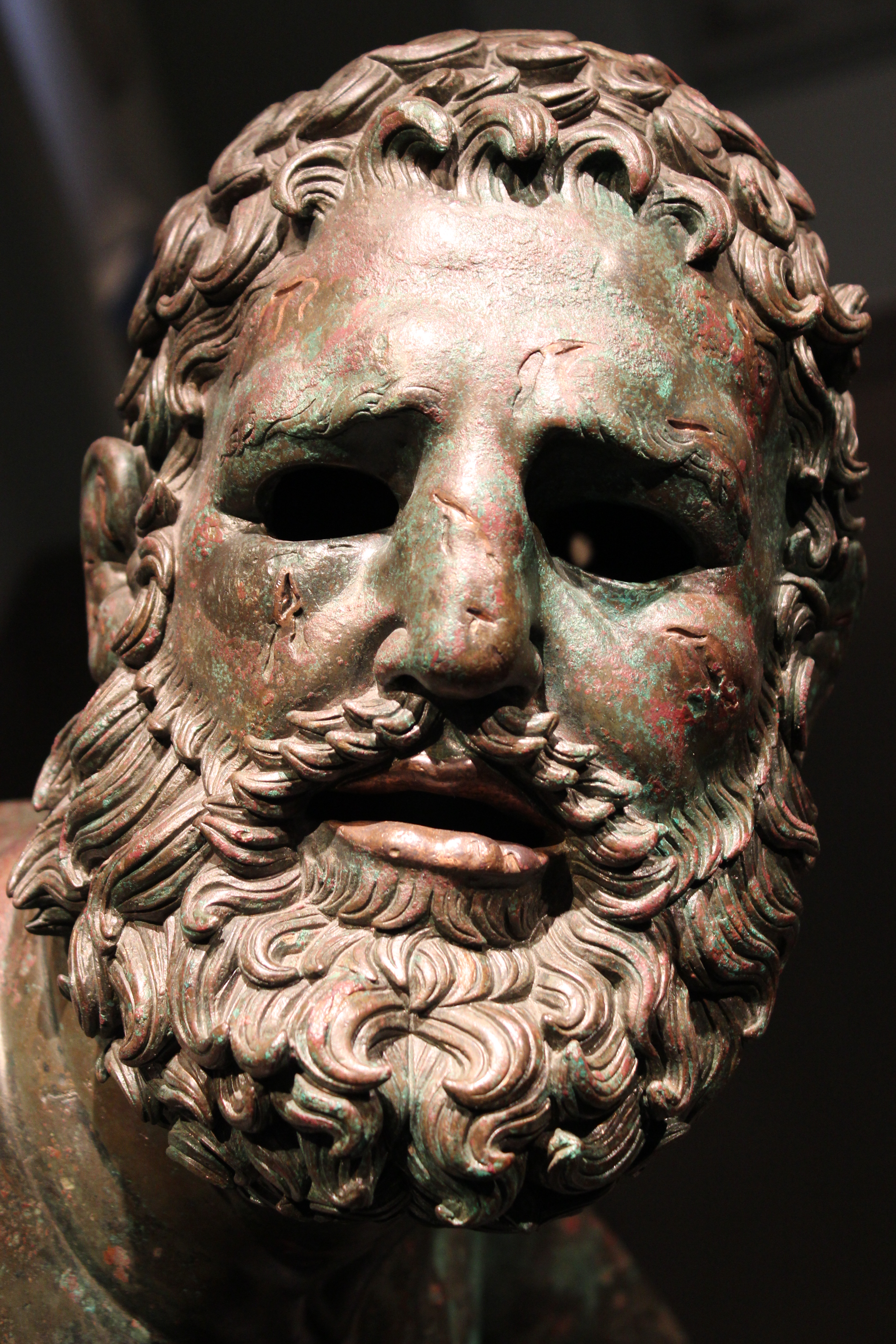
Head

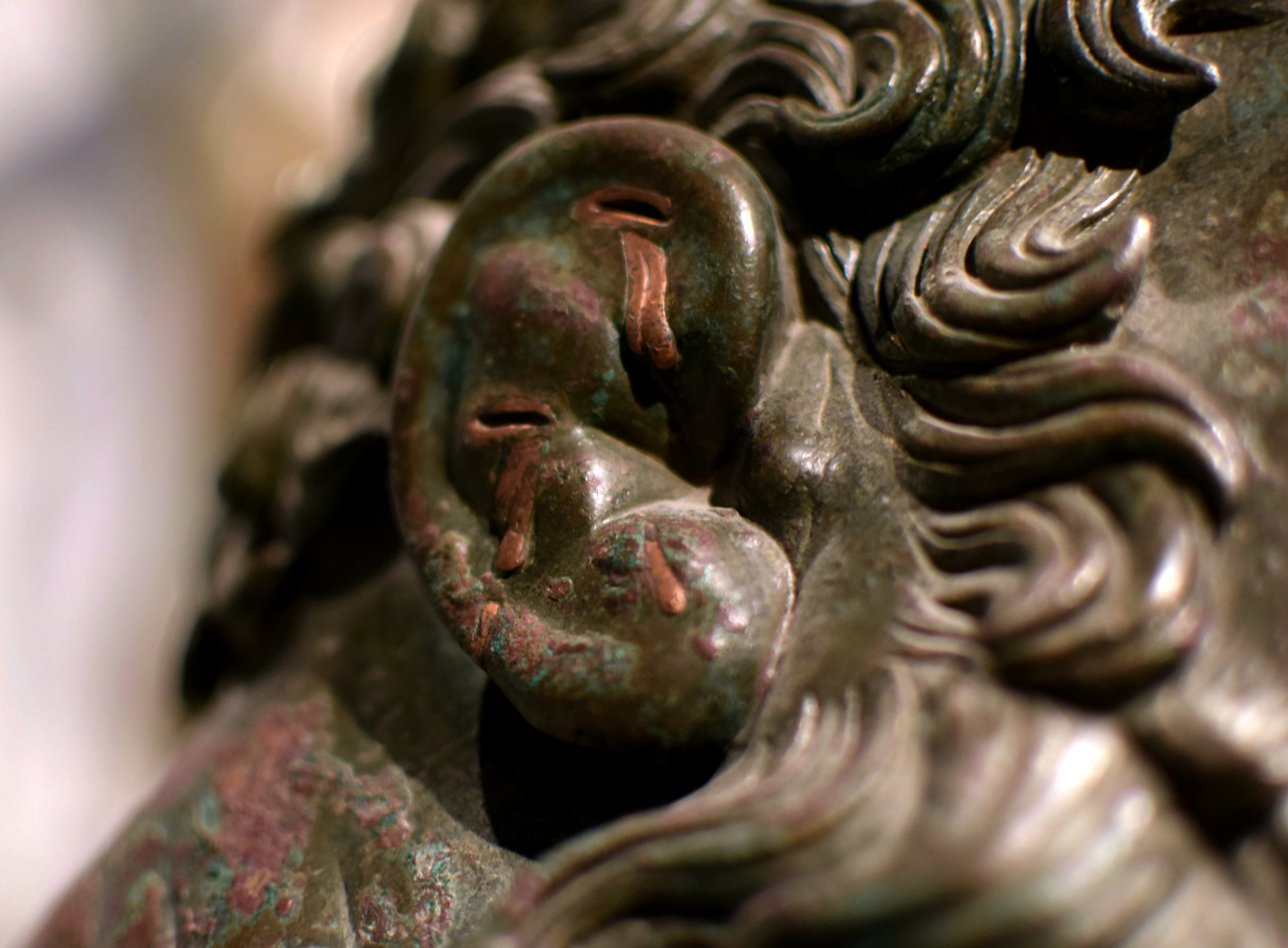
Cauliflower ear

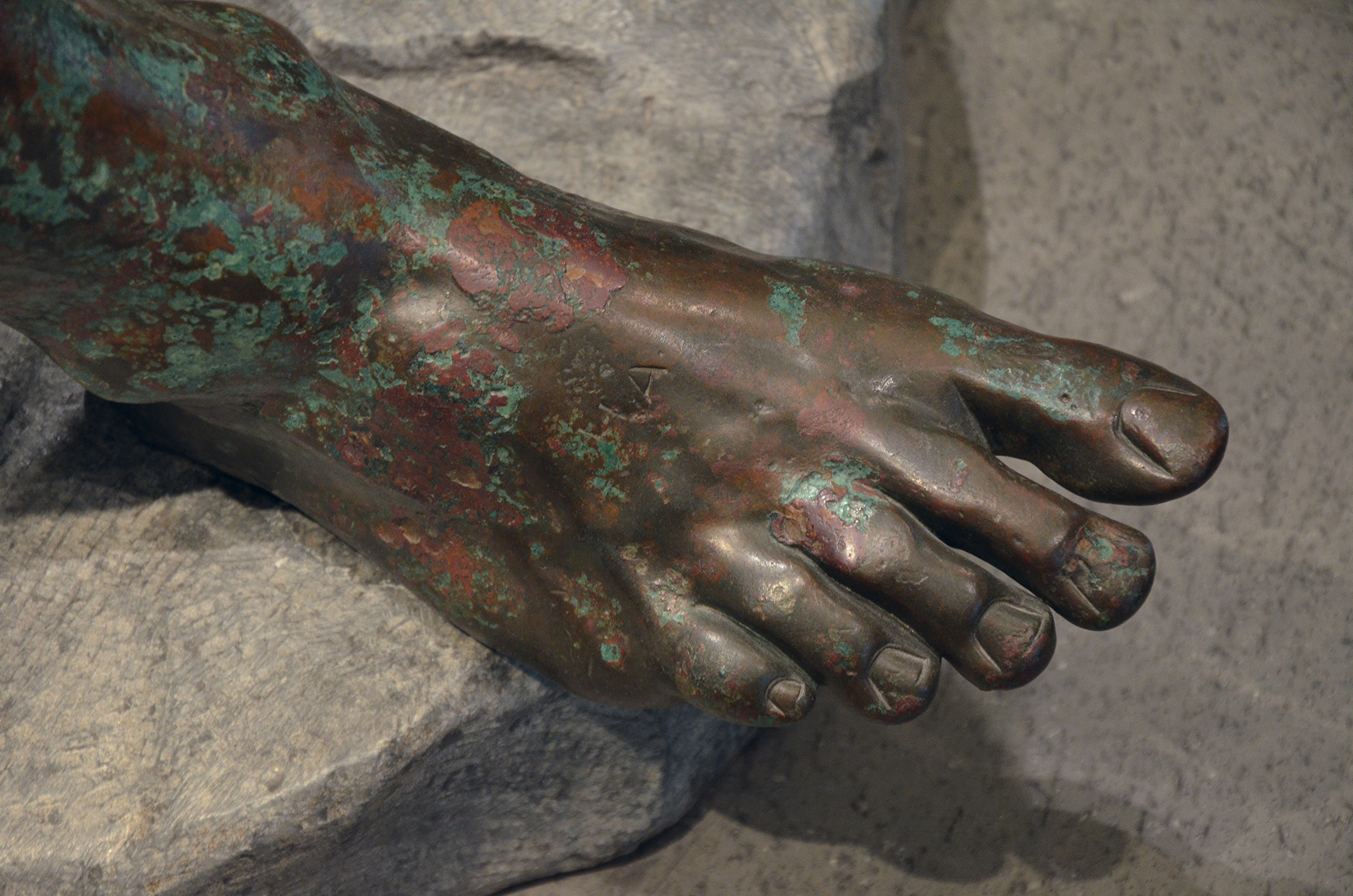
Morton's toe

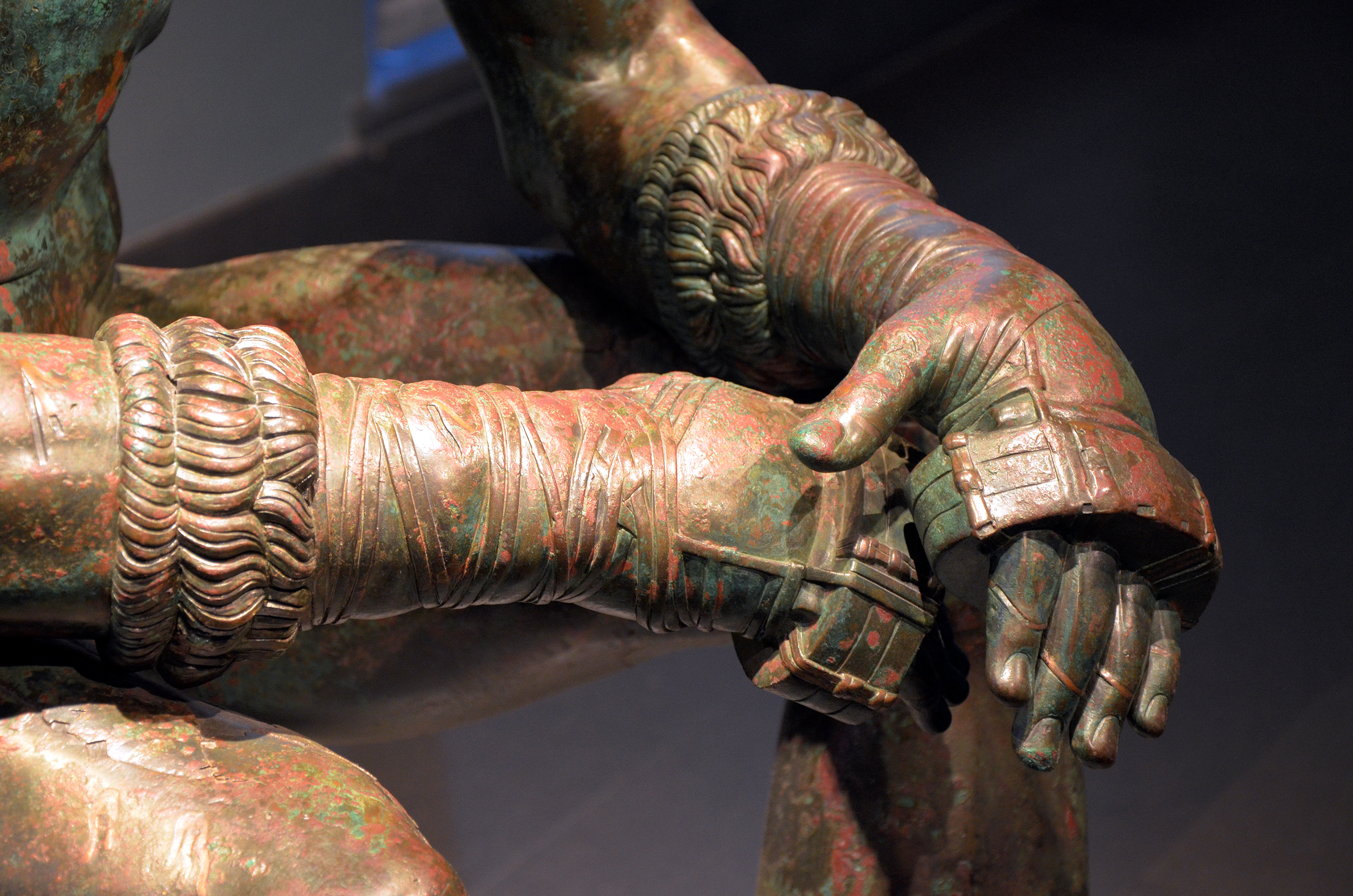
Cestus

For a long time, it was believed, based on a few visible letters, that the statue was by a certain Apollonius, possibly the creator of the "Belvedere Torso." However, this has now been disproved; in fact, there is no signature on the Boxer.

== Reception ==
External videos
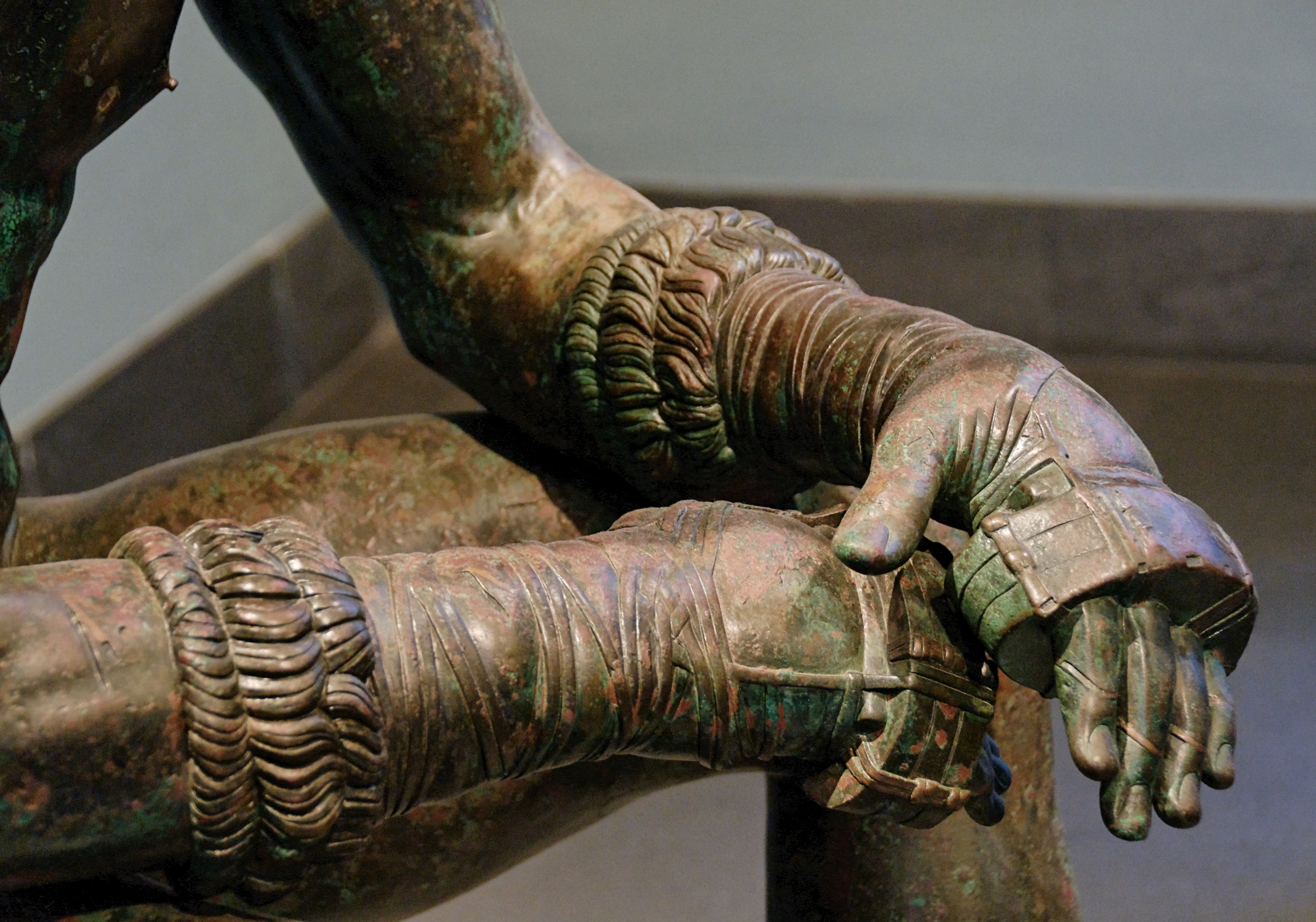
- Apollonius's Boxer at Rest, Smarthistory

The literary and aesthetic reception of the statue continues to be of high regard for its aesthetic virtues. In 1991, Thom Jones wrote "The Pugilist at Rest", a short story which includes the aesthetic reflection upon the statue's rare quality as seen through the eyes of a worn and weary boxer contemplating its inspiration. He suggested that the sitter may be the famed Ancient boxer, Theogenes.

During the time of its display in New York during the summer of 2013 (ended 20 July), New York magazine published a full page dedication to the special qualities and attributes of the statue by Jerry Saltz. Saltz described the six distinctive features of the statue as follows: (i) The Pose, distinct for its massiveness and "elemental" form, (ii) The Face, noted for the large brow and columnar neck, (iii) The Blood, noted by its inlaid copper upon the bronze statue itself, (iv) The Scarred Genitals, distinct for being infibulated for cultural and aesthetic purposes of ancient times, (v) The Hands, noted for being astounding yet gentle at the same time, and (vi) The Foresight, referring to the sculptor's strength of vision which resembles and conjures Goya's Giant as well as comparison with "Velazquez and Rembrandt", as Saltz completes his list.

The Italian poet Gabriele Tinti has written essays and some poems on sculpture and presented a series of readings in front of the statue at the J. Paul Getty Museum with the actor Robert Davi and at the National Roman Museum with the actor Franco Nero. Paul Gallico, the American boxing commentator who was himself an amateur boxer, examined the statue in 1935. On the basis of this he concluded that the Terme Boxer was a left-handed slugger who faced a fast-moving and right-handed opponent who circled him and wore him down with punches to Terme Boxer's right while avoiding his left. Thus the Terme Boxer could not land his devastating knock-out punch. Gallico's assessment was forensic, and based on the pattern of wounds which are all on the Terme Boxer's right - some blows smashed into the right side of his face and others hit his right shoulder and arm. The Terme Boxer must have tried to protect his head by raising his right arm and the wounds there are interpreted as defensive. Gallico who had called many prizefights concluded that the Terme Boxer was worn down and brought to exhaustion, as the statue shows. Gallico believed that the Terme Boxer statue depicts the boxer as having lost the contest.
