= Codpiece =

Flap or pouch that covers the crotch of men's trousers

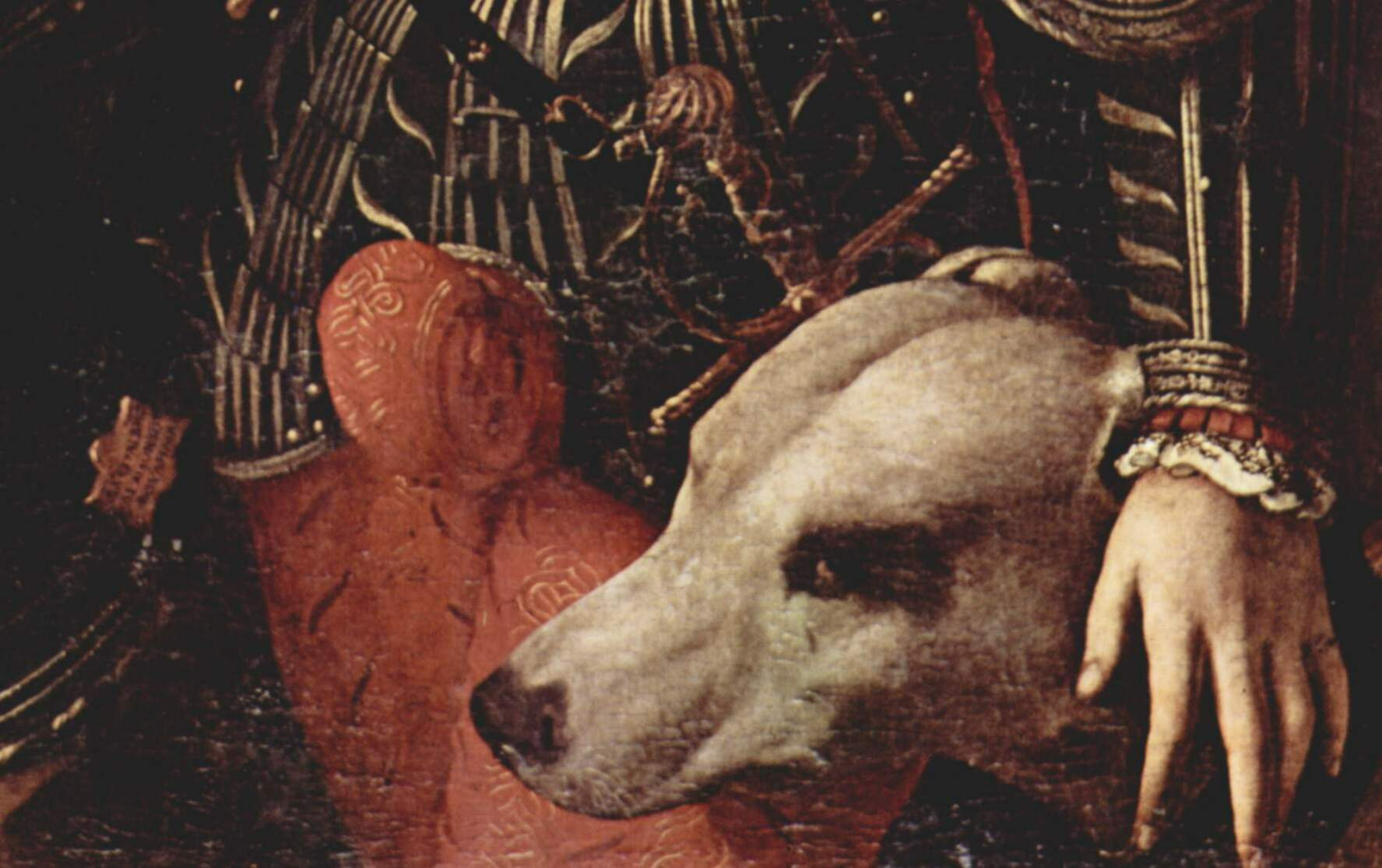
Codpiece and dog belonging to Guidobaldo II della Rovere, Duke of Urbino, portrait by Angelo Bronzino, 1531–32

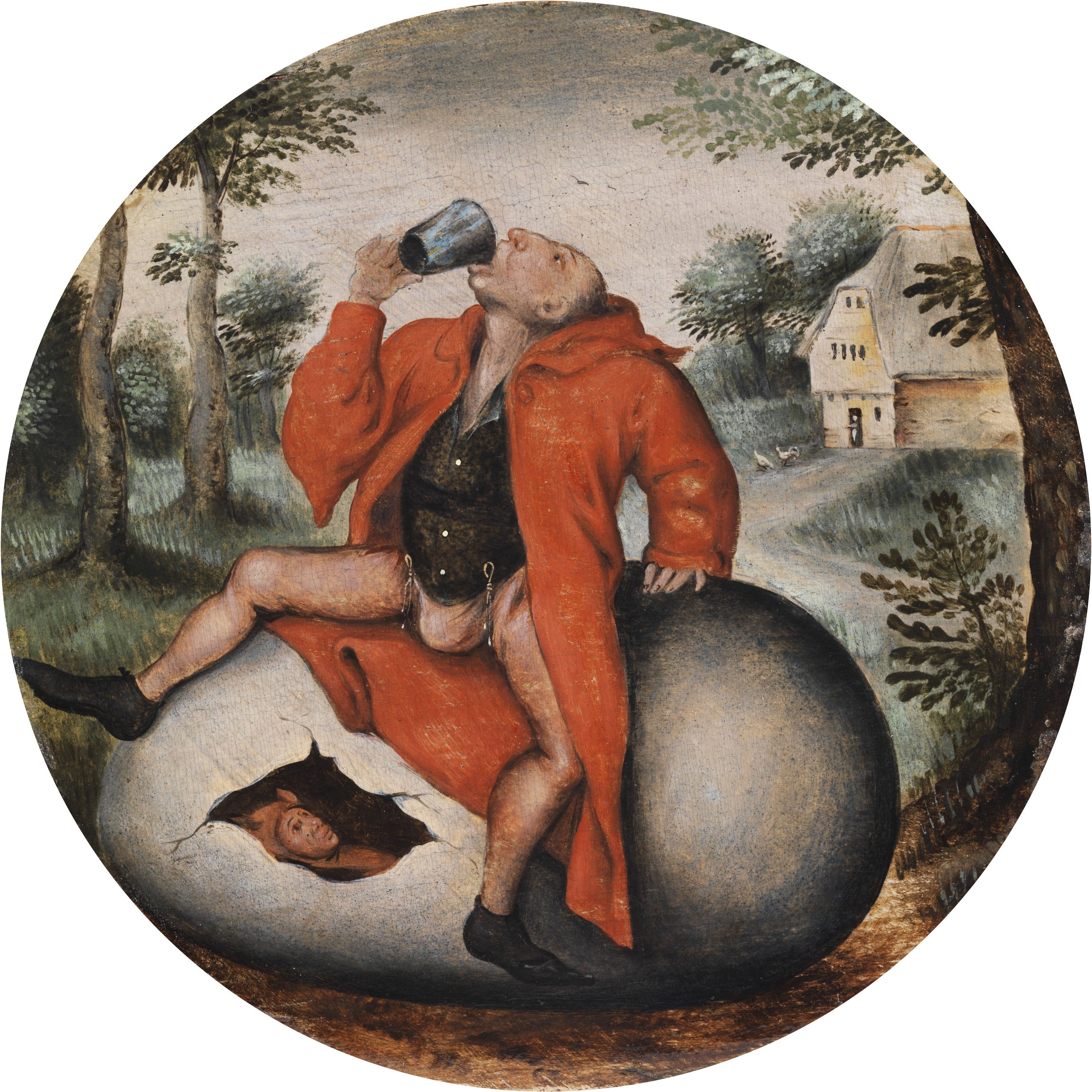
A codpiece was commonly worn during the Renaissance; oil on oak painting by Pieter Brueghel the Younger

A codpiece (from Middle English cod 'scrotum') is a triangular piece that attached to the front of men's hose, covering the fly. It may be held in place by ties or buttons. It was an important fashion item of European clothing during the 15th–16th centuries, in the 16th century becoming a firm upwards-pointing projection based on a stiff material such as boiled leather, or in plate armour, steel.

In the modern era, similar clothing pieces are worn in the leather subculture, and in performance costumes, such as for rock and metal musicians. A similar device with rigid construction, an athletic cup, is used as protective gear for male athletes.

== In European fashion ==
From the ancient world there are extant depictions of articles of clothing designed to cover just the male genitalia; for example, archaeological recovery at Minoan Knossos on Crete has yielded figurines, some of whom wear only a garment covering the male genitalia. However, the codpiece, per se, appeared in everyday European fashion for men only many centuries later, associated with hose and trousers.

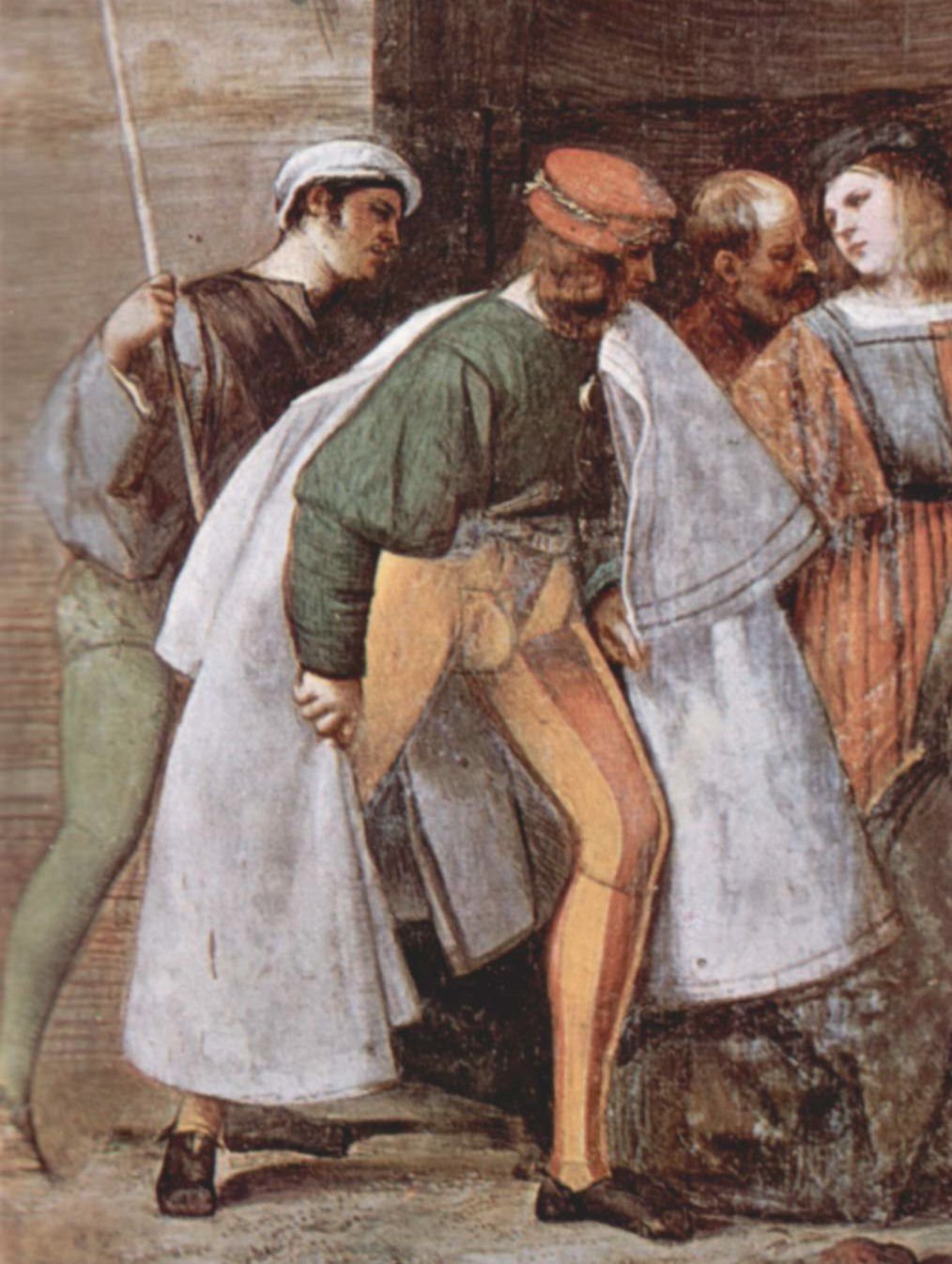
1511 codpiece with buttons

In 14th century European fashions, men's hose were two separate legs worn over linen drawers, leaving a man's genitals covered only by a layer of the linen drawers. As the century wore on and men's hemline fashion rose, the hose became longer and joined at the centre back, there rising to the waist, but remaining open at the centre front. Further shortening of the cote or doublet fashion resulted in more prominence of the genitals; this area would then be covered with a triangular material called a codpiece. Most of what is known about the cut, fit, and materials used for Renaissance codpieces is through portraits, clothing inventories, receipts for payments and tailor cutting guides.

As time passed, codpieces became shaped and padded to emphasize rather than to conceal the penis. Such excessive codpieces became an object of derision showered on outlandish fashions. The Renaissance author François Rabelais refers satirically to a book entitled On the Dignity of Codpieces in the foreword to his 1532 book The Histories of Gargantua and Pantagruel. This fashion reached its peak of size and decoration in the 1540s before falling out of use by the 1590s.

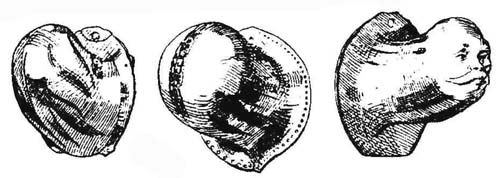
Metal codpieces, 16th century

Suits of armor of the 16th century followed civilian fashion, and for a time, codpieces were a prominent addition to the full suits of armor. A few examples of full suits of armor with codpieces are on display in museums today. The Metropolitan Museum of Art in New York City has one. The Higgins Armory in Worcester, Massachusetts, also had an example on display until its close. The armor of Henry VIII displayed in the Tower of London has a codpiece as well. Examples of metal parts of such armor are depicted by Wendelin Boeheim in his 1890 publication on the history of weapons, Handbuch der Waffenkunde, which was published in Leipzig, Germany.

Ian Anderson from the band Jethro Tull was a notable codpiece wearer at the height of the band's fame. As the band's website declares: "He declares a lifelong commitment to music as a profession, being far too young to hang up his hat or his flute, although the tights and codpiece have long since been consigned to some forgotten bottom drawer."

== Gallery ==
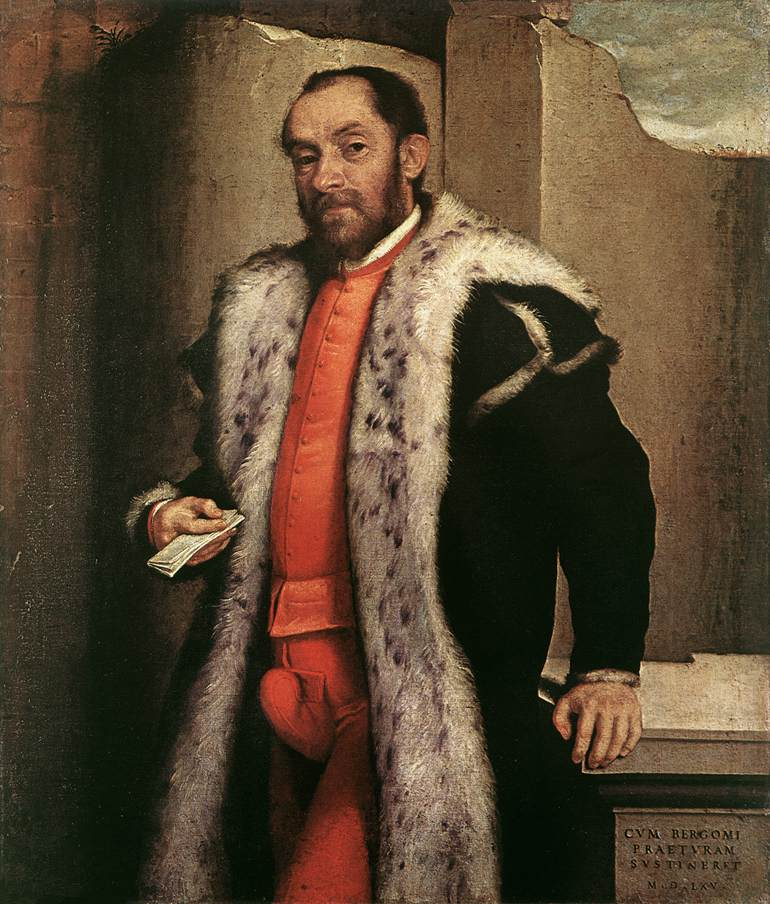
Portrait of Antonio Navagero (1565) with an accentuated codpiece, oil on canvas by Giovanni Battista Moroni, Pinacoteca di Brera, Milan

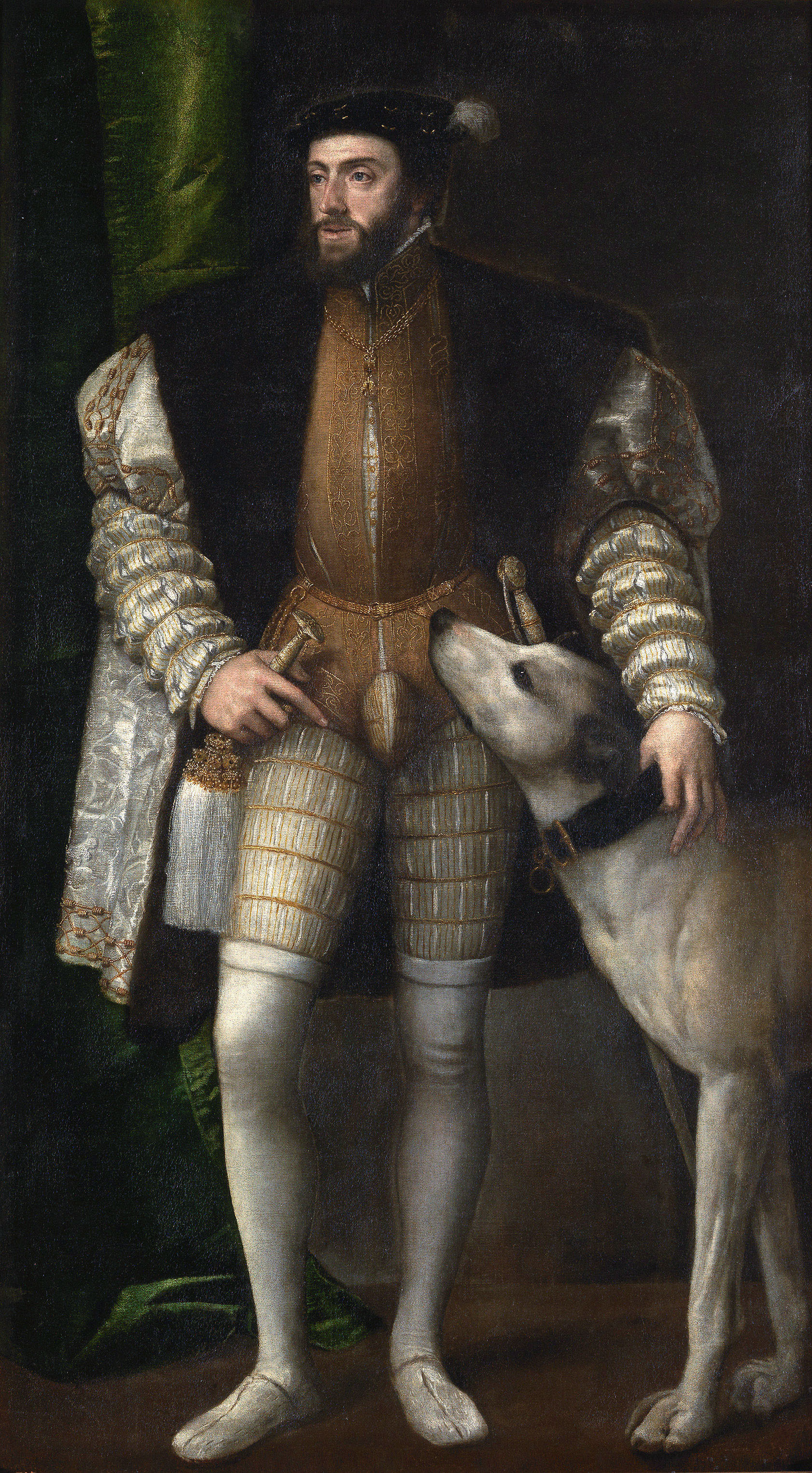
Charles V, Holy Roman Emperor, by Titian, 1533, shown wearing a codpiece with short doublet, Museo del Prado

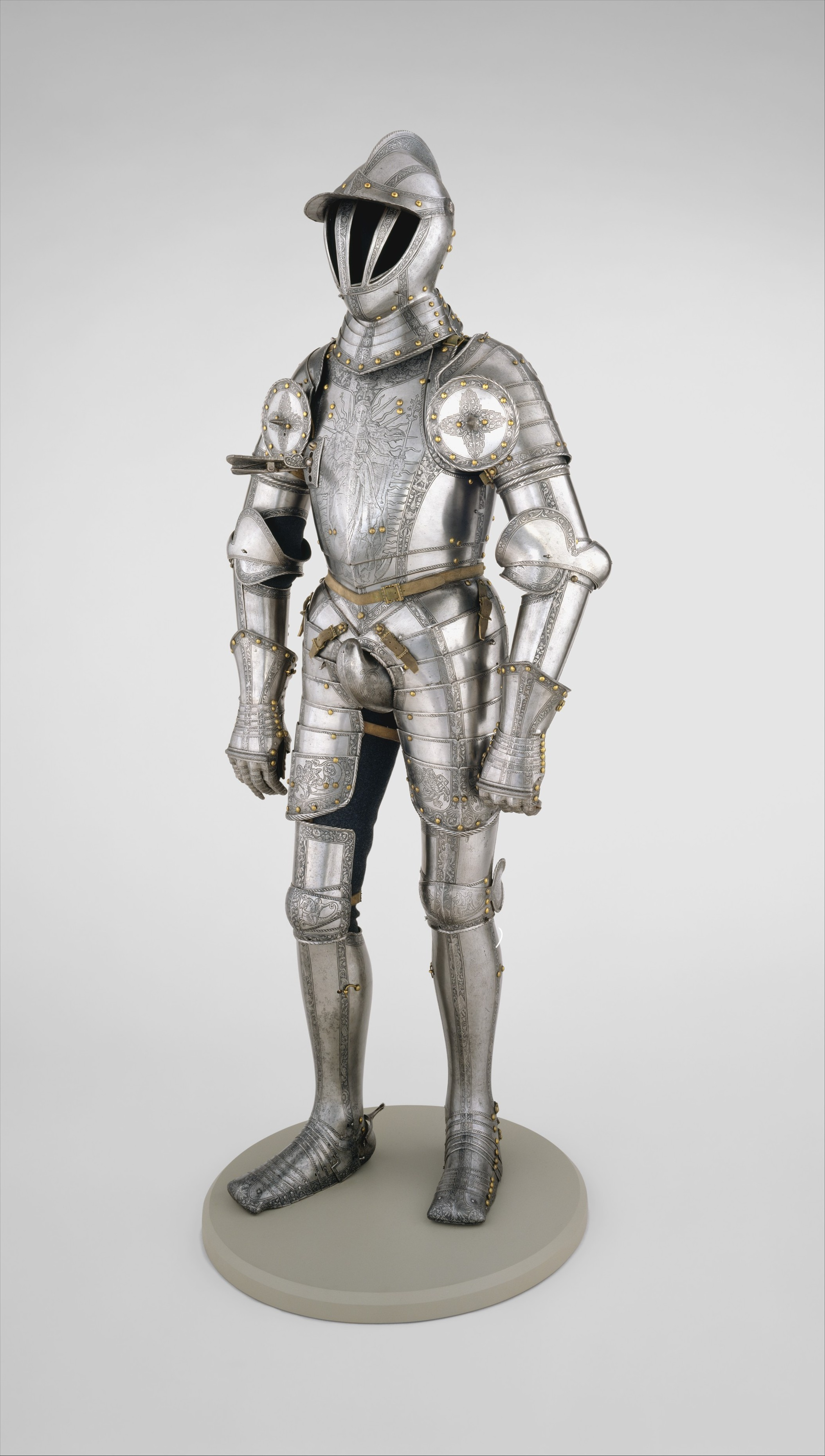
Armor of Ferdinand I, Holy Roman Emperor (1549), Metropolitan Museum of Art

== See also ==
- Jockstrap
- Koteka, penis sheath used in Papua New Guinea
- Kynodesme
- Willy warmer
- 1500–1550 in fashion
- 1550–1600 in fashion
