= Koteka Tribal Assembly =

The Koteka Tribal Assembly (Indonesian: Dewan Musyawarah Masyarakat Adat Koteka, abbreviated as DeMMaK) is a cultural organisation of the Koteka-wearing tribes of the then Papua province region in Indonesia. It was established in January 2000 (25 years ago) as an outcome of discussions among the elders of several tribes in the highlands of the region. The main goal of the assembly is to peacefully, democratically and legally work towards the recognition and protection of customary laws, values and beliefs of the Koteka peoples. Many activists from the organization who were involved in peaceful protests have been tortured and forced into exile.

DeMMaK was in May 2000, prior to the Papuan People's Congress II (2000) held in Jayapura. The field leader of DeMMaK is Benny Wenda. Sam Karoba is the founder and international chair of DeMMaK. Though DeMMaK is generally supportive of the PDP, it accuses the latter of being too accommodating of the government.

Koteka Tribes claimed to consists of seven major tribes in the central and southern highlands of Papua; namely Lani, Mee, Amungme, Kamoro, Yali, Damal, and Moni with other sub-tribes such as Nggem, Walak, Hubla, Kimyal, Momuna, Ngalik. According to DeMMaK, the above is the division of the Koteka Tribes according to foreigners. The people from the Koteka Tribes themselves classify the Koteka Tribes into four major tribes: Lani, Mee, Loma and Yali Tribes.

It is organised in as a confederation that consists of elders who independently and autonomously join and or leave the assembly as they wish, and contribute to the organisation according to their willingness and capabilities in order to achieve their goal. DeMMaK is managed under coordination of a Secretary-General that is assisted by Coordinators based on activities carried out within the Assembly.

== See also ==
- Koteka peoples
