= Umberto Curi =

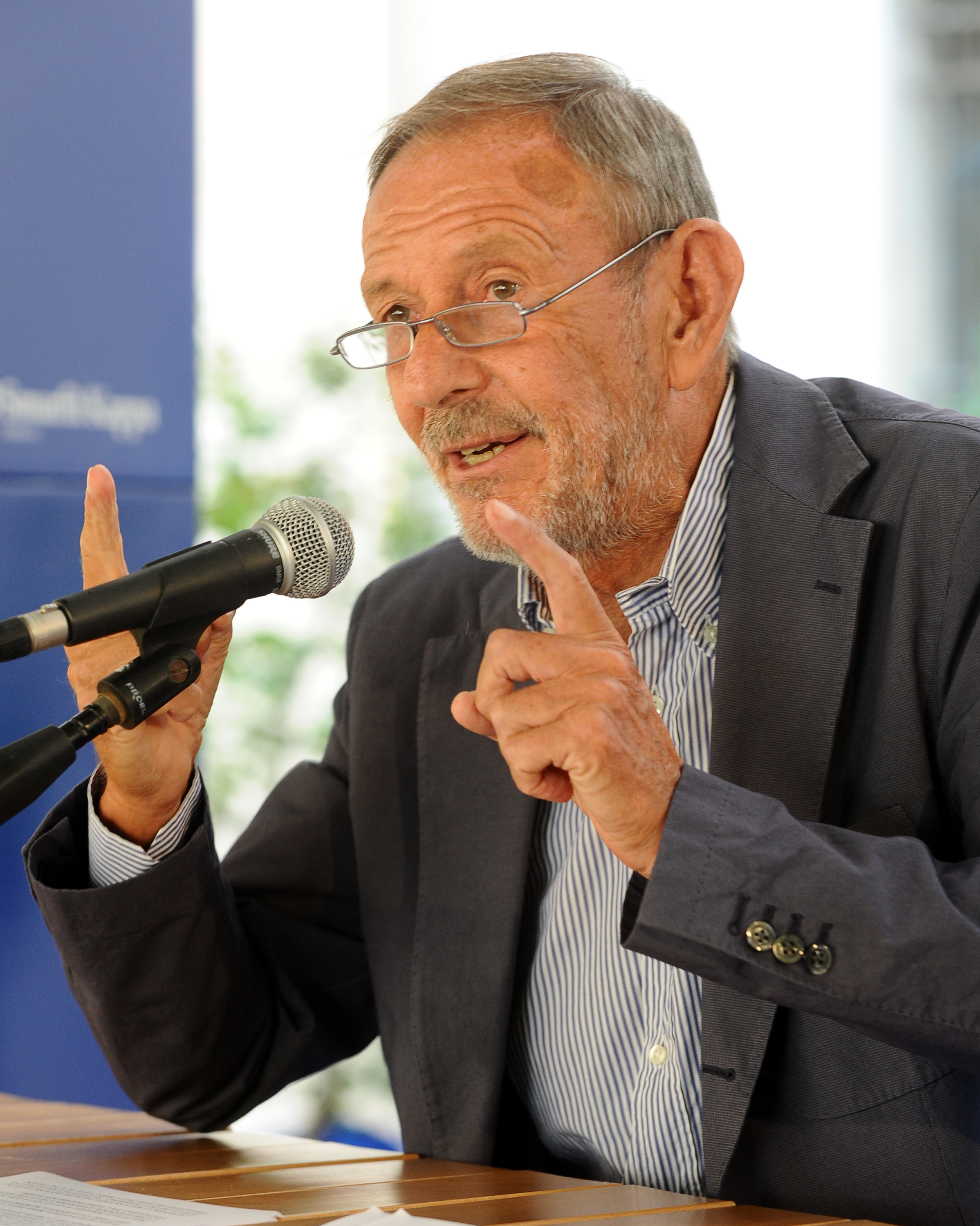
- Curi in 2012
- Born: September 4, 1941 (age 84); Verona, Italy
- Known for: poetry

Umberto Curi (Verona, 4 September 1941) is an Italian philosopher and former professor at University of Padua.

== Biography ==
Umberto Curi obtained his degree in 1964 and subsequently specialized in philosophy in 1967 at the University of Padua. In 1971 he obtained the teaching position in the "history of modern and contemporary philosophy". He became a full professor in 1986, at the Faculty of Lettere e Filosofia of the University of Padua. He retired in 2008 and was then appointed emeritus professor. He directed the “Istituto Gramsci-Veneto” cultural foundation for over twenty years and was also, for a decade, a member of the Board of Directors of the Venice Biennale.

== Works ==
- Il problema dell'unità del sapere nel comportamentismo, CEDAM, Padova, 1967.
- Analisi operazionale e operazionismo, CEDAM, Padova, 1970.
- L'analisi operazionale della psicologia, Franco Angeli, Milano, 1973.
- Dagli Jonici alla crisi della fisica, CEDAM, Padova, 1974.
- Sulla “scientificità” del marxismo, Feltrinelli, Milano, 1975.
- Anticonformismo e libertà intellettuale: per una dialettica tra pensiero e politica, Padova, 1977.
- Psicologia e critica dell'ideologia, Bertani, Roma, 1977.
- La ricerca in America 1900-1940, a cura di, Marsilio, Venezia, 1978.
- Società civile e stato tra Hegel e Marx, Cleup, Padova, 1980.
- Katastrophé. Sulle forme del mutamento scientifico, Arsenale Cooperativa, Venezia, 1982.
- La razionalità scientifica, Abano Terme, 1982.
- La linea divisa. Modelli di razionalità e pratiche scientifiche nel pensiero occidentale, De Donato, Bari, 1983.
- Pensare la guerra. Per una cultura della pace, Dedalo, Bari, 1985.
- Dimensioni del tempo, a cura di, Franco Angeli, Milano, 1987.
- L'opera di Einstein, Gabriele Corbo, Ferrara, 1988.
- La cosmologia oggi tra scienza e filosofia, Gabriele Corbo, Ferrara, 1988.
- La politica sommersa. Per un'analisi del sistema politico italiano, Franco Angeli, Milano, 1989.
- Lo scudo di Achille. Il PCI nella grande crisi, Franco Angeli, Milano, 1990.
- L'albero e la foresta. Il Partito Democratico della Sinistra nel sistema politico italiano (con Paolo Flores d'Arcais), Franco Angeli, Milano, 1990.
- Erwin Schroedinger, scienziato e filosofo, Il Poligrafo, Padova, 1990.
- The antropic principle, CUP, Cambridge (UK), 1991.
- Metamorfosi del tragico tra classico e moderno, De Donato, Bari. 1991.
- L'albero e la foresta. Il Partito Democratico della Sinistra nel sistema politico italiano (with Paolo Flores D'Arcais), Milano, 1991.
- La repubblica che non c'è, Milano, 1992.
- Origini. L'universo, la vita, l'intelligenza, Il Poligrafo, Padova, 1993.
- Pensare la guerra. Per una cultura della pace, Dedalo, Bari, 1993.
- Kosmos. Cosmology between Science and Philosophy, CUP, Cambridge (UK), 1994.
- Poròs. Dialogo in una società che rifiuta la bellezza (with Angelina de Lillo), Milano, 1995
- L'orto di Zenone. Coltivare per osmosi (with Federico Friggio), Milano, 1996.
- La cognizione dell'amore. Eros e filosofia, Feltrinelli, Milano, 1997.
- Il mantello e la scarpa. Filosofia e scienza tra Platone e Einstein, Il Poligrafo, Padova, 1998.
- Pensare la guerra. L'Europa e il destino della politica, Dedalo, Bari, 1999.
- Pólemos. Filosofia come guerra, Bollati Boringhieri, Torino, 2000.
- Endiadi. Figure della duplicità, Feltrinelli, Milano, 2000.
- Lo schermo del pensiero. Cinema e filosofia, Raffaello Cortina Editore, Milano, 2000.
- Ombre delle idee. Filosofia del cinema fra «American beauty» e «Parla con lei», Pendragon, Bologna, 2002.
- Filosofia del Don Giovanni. Alle origini di un mito moderno, Bruno Mondadori, Milano, 2002.
- Il farmaco della democrazia. Alle radici della politica, Marinotti, Milano, 2003.
- La forza dello sguardo, Bollati Boringhieri, Torino, 2004.
- Skenos. Il Don Giovanni nella società dello spettacolo (with Laura Cesaroni), Milano, 2005.
- Libidine e denuncia. L'eros nella società della corruzione, Milano, 2005.
- Un filosofo al cinema, Bompiani, Milano, 2006.
- Meglio non essere nati. La condizione umana tra Eschilo e Nietzsche, Bollati Boringhieri, Torino, 2008.
- Miti d'amore. Filosofia dell'eros, Bompiani, Milano, 2009.
- Pensare con la propria testa, Mimesis, Milano, 2009 (con due cd).
- Straniero, Raffaello Cortina Editore, Milano, 2010.
- Passione, Raffaello Cortina Editore, Milano, 2013.
- La porta stretta. Come diventare maggiorenni, Bollati Boringhieri, Torino, 2015.
- I figli di Ares. Guerra infinita e terrorismo, Castelvecchi, Roma, 2016.
- La brama dell'avere (with Sabino Chialà), Il Margine, Trento, 2016.
- Il coraggio di pensare, manualistica di filosofia, Loescher editore, Torino, 2018.
