= Kynodesme =

Cord or string worn by ancient Greece and Etruria athletes

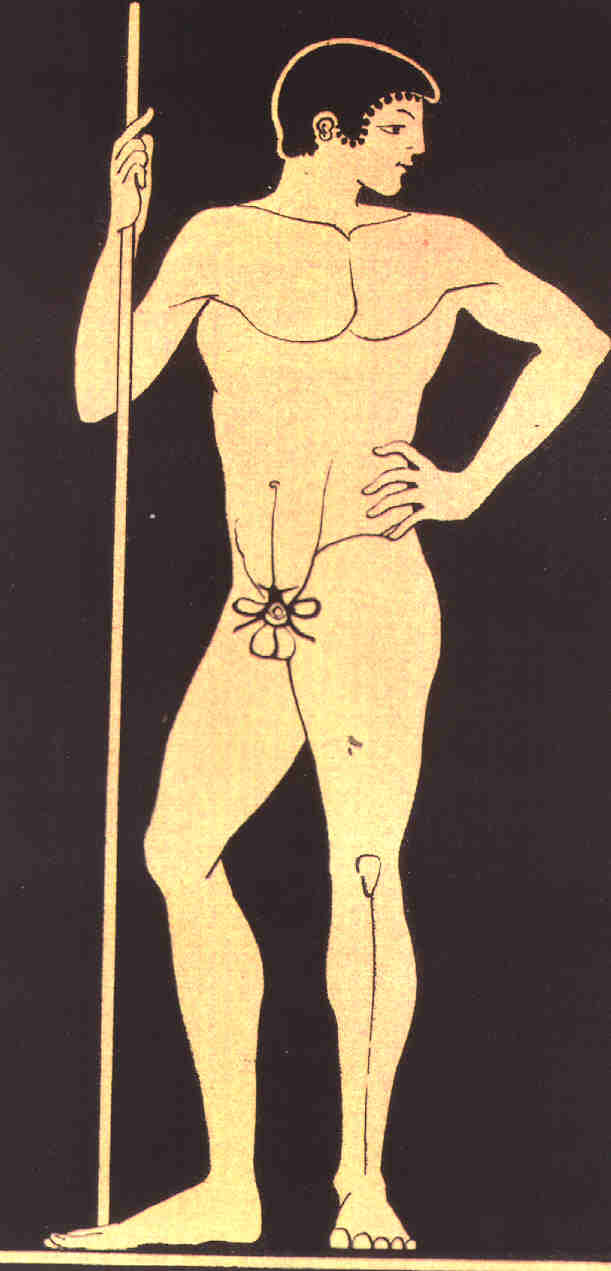
Picture of a classical Greek athlete wearing the kynodesme (attributed to the Triptolemos painter, dating from about 480 BC)

A kynodesmē (Greek: κυνοδέσμη, English translation: "dog tie") was a cord or string or sometimes a leather strip that was worn primarily by athletes in Ancient Greece and Etruria to prevent the exposure of the glans penis in public (considered to be ill-mannered) and to restrict untethered movement of the penis during sporting competition. It was tied tightly around the akroposthion, the most distal, tubular portion of the foreskin that extends beyond the glans. As depicted in Ancient Greek art the kynodesme was worn by some athletes, actors, poets, symposiasts and komasts. It was worn temporarily while in public and could be taken off and put back on at will. The remaining length of cord could either be attached to a waist band to pull the penis upward and expose the scrotum, or tied around the base of the penis and scrotum so that the penis appeared to curl downwards.

== Purpose ==
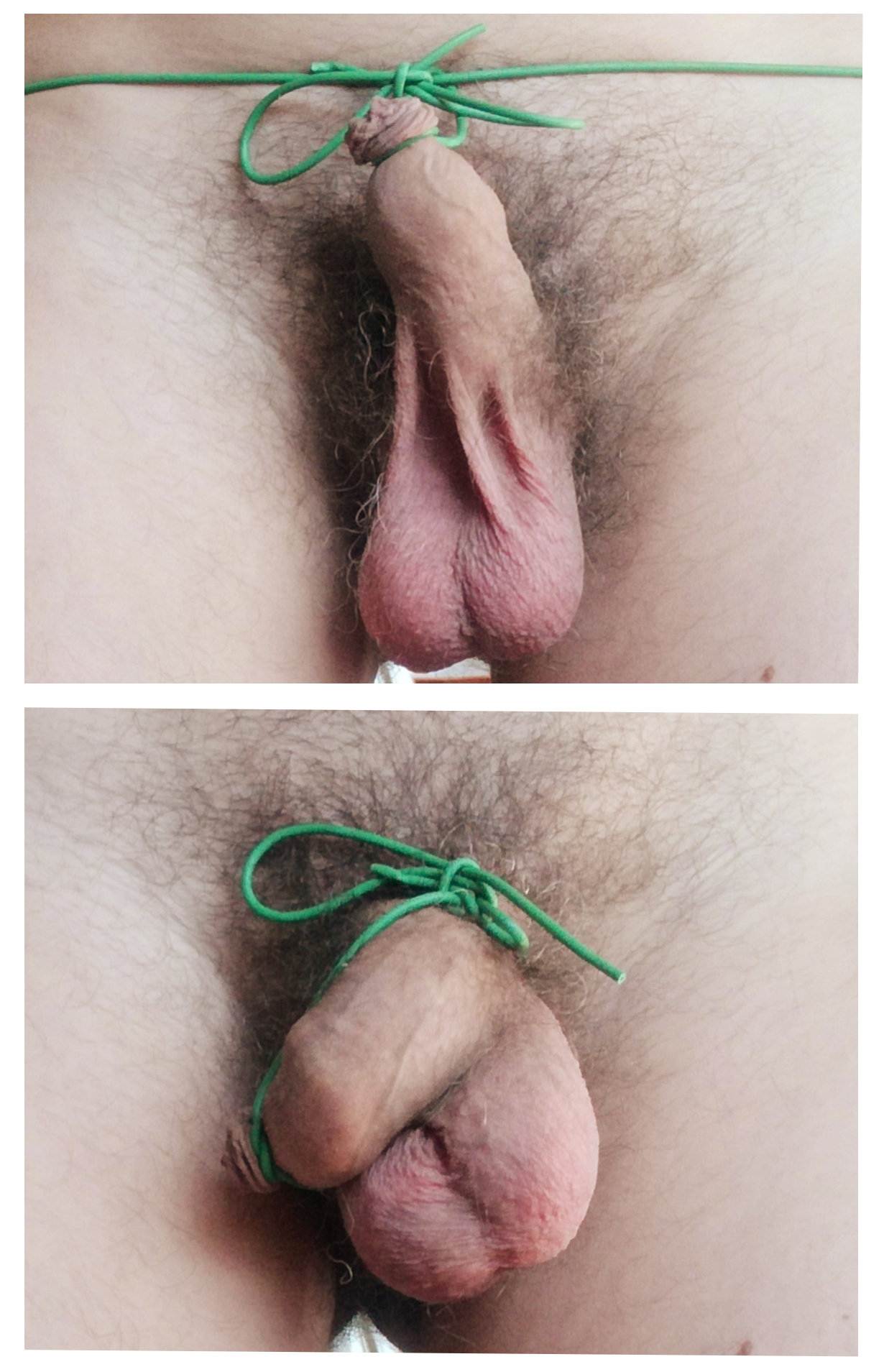
The two different ways in which the kynodesme may be tied. Above: the tie around the foreskin is connected to a belt-like loop around the waist. Below: the tie around the foreskin is connected to a loop around the scrotum.

The public exposure of the penis head was regarded by the Greeks as dishonourable and shameful, something only seen in slaves and barbarians. Modesty and decency demanded that men who showed themselves naked in a public setting, such as athletes or actors, must conceal their glans.

The usage of the kynodesme might have also helped to naturally elongate the foreskin, which was seen as desirable.

In Greek and Roman medical practice, the uncontrolled dispersing of semen was thought to weaken men, and was particularly thought to affect the quality of the masculine voice. In ancient Rome, this form of non-surgical infibulation might thus be used by singers as a regimen for preserving the voice.

== In art ==
It is first alluded to in literature in the 5th century BC, in the partially preserved satyr play Theoroi by Aeschylus. There is earlier evidence from the images of athletes on Ancient Greek pottery. The Kynodesme was also used by the Etruscans and Romans who called it a ligatura praeputii. The Romans however preferred to use a ring known as a fibula, rather than a band, to conceal the glans.

== See also ==
- Codpiece (from Middle English: cod, meaning "scrotum") – a covering flap or pouch that attaches to the front of men's trousers, enclosing the genital area
- Koteka – a penis sheath traditionally worn by native male inhabitants of some ethnic groups in New Guinea to cover their genitals
- Namba – a traditional penis sheath from Vanuatu
- A penile fibula is a ring, attached with a pin through the foreskin to fasten it above the glans penis

== Sources ==
- Hodges FM. The Ideal Prepuce in Ancient Greece and Rome: Male Genital Aesthetics and Their Relation to Lipodermos, Circumcision, Foreskin Restoration, and the Kynodesme. Bulletin of the History of Medicine 2001; 75:375–405.
- Osborne, Robin (2004). Greek History. London and New York: Routledge. p. 10. ISBN 0-415-31717-7.
- Keuls, Eva (1986). Reign of the Phallus. Berkeley and Los Angeles, California: University of California Press. p. 68. ISBN 0-520-07929-9.
