= Koteka =

Traditional New Guinean penis sheath

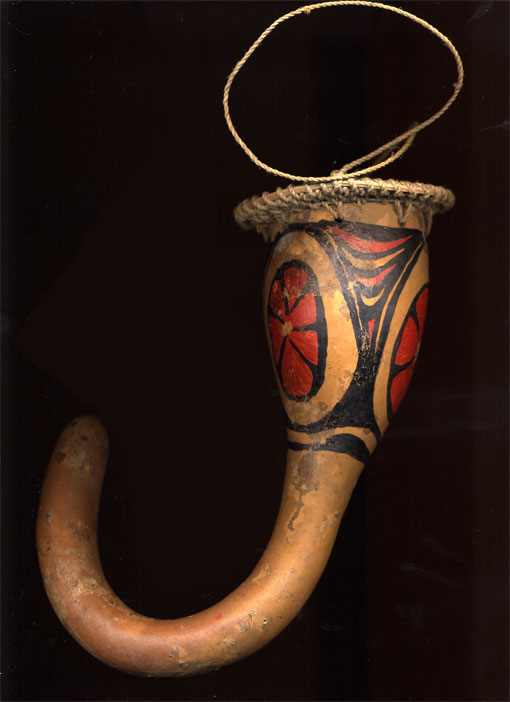
- Koteka souvenir
- Place of origin: Indonesia (Central Papua and Highland Papua); Papua New Guinea

The koteka (Mee, lit. 'clothing'), also referred to as a horim or penis gourd, is a penis sheath traditionally worn by native male inhabitants of some (mainly highland) ethnic groups in New Guinea. The koteka is normally made from a dried-out gourd, Lagenaria siceraria, although unrelated species such as pitcher-plant (Nepenthes mirabilis) are also used. The koteka is held in place by a small loop of fiber attached to the base of the koteka and placed around the scrotum. A secondary loop placed around the chest or abdomen is attached to the main body of the koteka.

Men choose kotekas similar to ones worn by other men in their respective cultural groups. For example, Yali men favour long, thin kotekas that help hold up the multiple rattan hoops worn around their waists, whereas Lani men wear double gourds held up with strips of cloth and use the space between the two gourds for carrying small items such as money and tobacco.

== Traditions ==
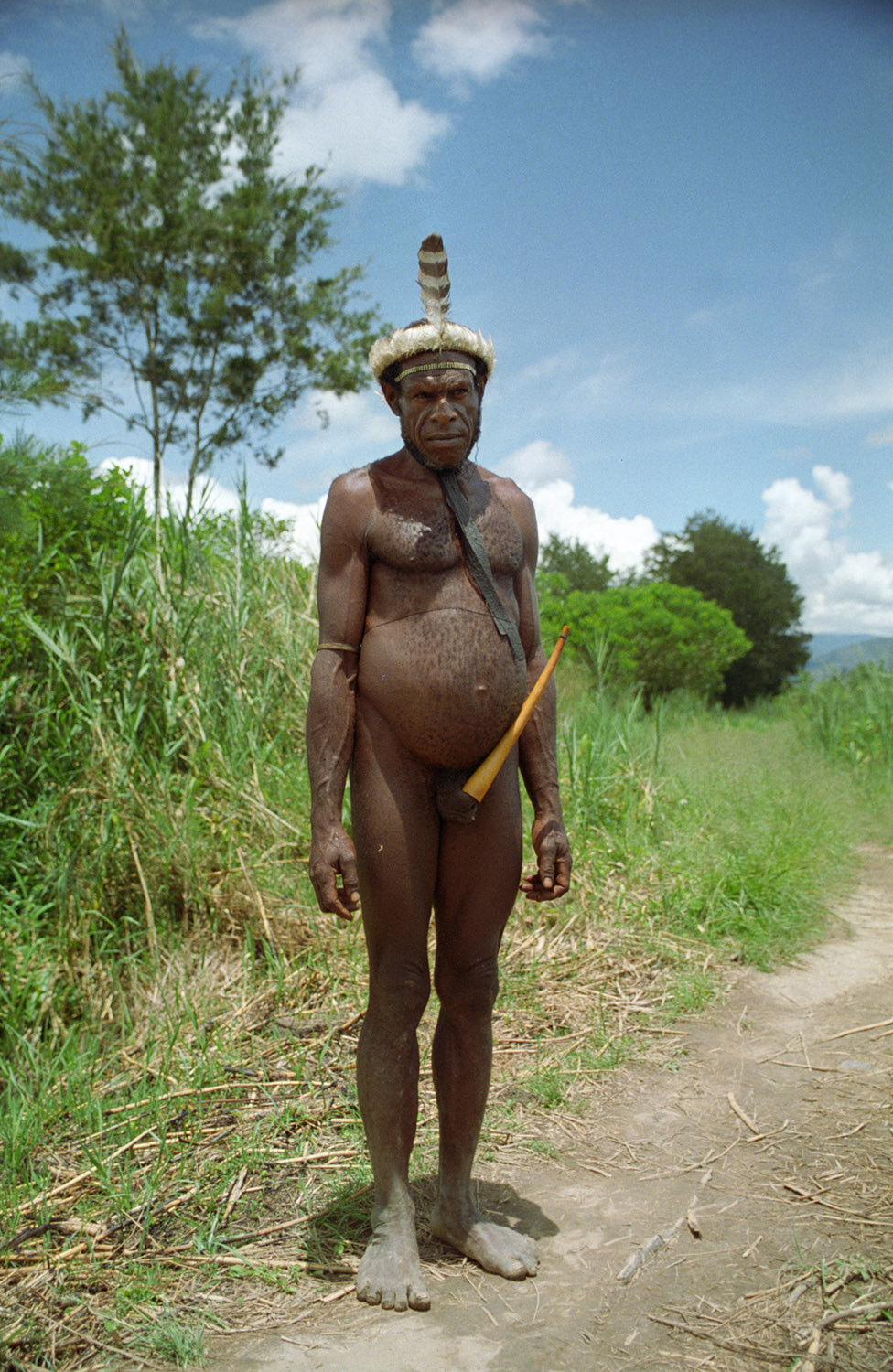
Dani warrior in the Baliem Valley wearing a holim

The koteka is traditional clothing in certain New Guinea highlands societies, including in the Grand Baliem Valley of Western New Guinea and the Ok Tedi and Telefomin regions of Papua New Guinea. Usually the koteka is worn without other clothing and is tied in an upward position.

== Tribal identification ==
Many tribes can be identified by the way they wear the koteka. The koteka may be pointed straight out, straight up, or at an angle. The diameter of the koteka can also be distinctive to an individual tribe. For Hubula (Dani) people of Baliem Valley, the shape of horim is associated with the social status of the wearer. A curved horim toward the front (kolo) is worn by Ap Kain, the leader of Dani confederation, a curved horik to the side (haliag) is worn by Ap Menteg (war general) and Ap Ubalik (healer or cultural leader). A straight Horim is worn by ordinary people. For Lani people, the angle is the marker of status. If the kobewak leans to the left the wearer is Apendabogur (war general). On the other hand if it leans to the right, the wearer is an aristocrat or rich. Straight kobewaks are worn by virgin men.

The koteka is made of a specially grown gourd. Stone weights are tied to the bottom of the gourd to stretch it out as it grows. Curves can be made in it by the use of string to restrain its growth in whatever direction the grower wishes; the koteka can be quite elaborately shaped in this manner. When harvested, the gourd is emptied and dried. It is sometimes waxed with beeswax or resin. It can be painted or have shells, feathers, and other decorations attached to it.

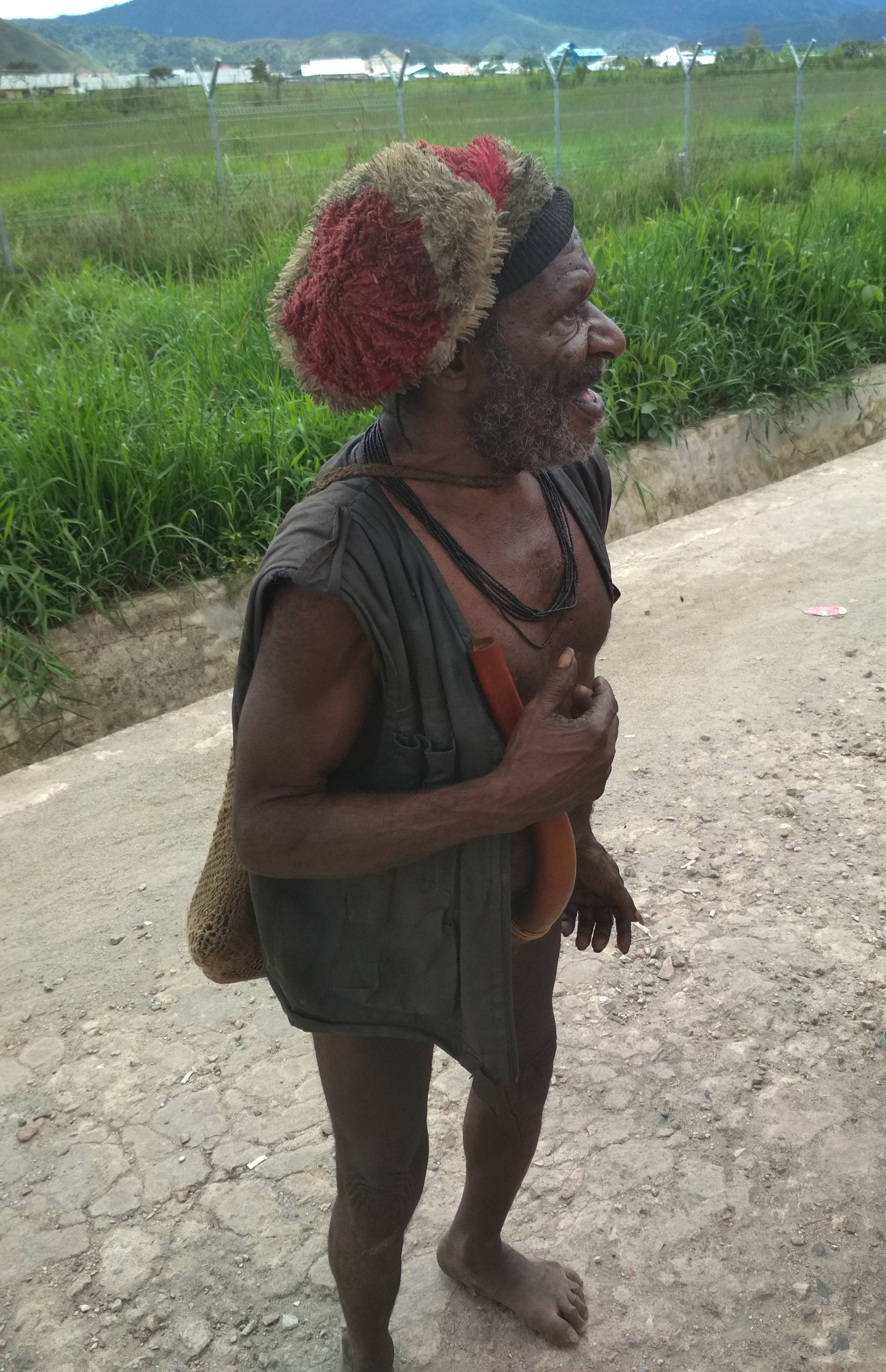
Mee man wearing a curved koteka

True kotekas as worn by the Mee consist of three types, long straight and curved used for festivities and traditional events, and short koteka for everyday use. They are worn using rope made from toya (Dendrobium utile) which is then knitted with tree barks fibres (usually from melinjo) to form the rope called koteka ma taboma. Unlike other koteka-wearing tribes, Mee men also wear other clothing items alongside their Kotekas. These clothing and bags are made with the same knitted fabric of toya and tree bark fibres.

The term koteka is used as a self-proclaimed name by Assembly of Koteka Tribes (DeMMak) organization who claimed to represent Koteka people, a union of seven major koteka-wearing tribes in the central and southern highlands of Papua; namely Lani, Mee, Amungme, Kamoro, Yali, Damal, and Moni with other sub-tribes such as Nggem, Walak, Hubla, Kimyal, Momuna, Ngalik.

== Discouragement of usage ==
In 1971–1972, the Indonesian New Order government launched "Operasi Koteka" ("Operation Koteka") which consisted primarily of trying to encourage the people to wear shorts and shirts because such clothes were considered more "modern." However the people did not have changes of clothing, did not have soap, and were unfamiliar with the care of such clothing, so the unwashed clothing caused skin diseases. There were also reports of men wearing the shorts as hats and the women using the dresses as carrying bags.

Eventually, the campaign was abandoned. Nevertheless, shirts and pants are required in government buildings, and children are required to wear them in school. As of 2019, it is estimated that only 10% highland population (in Central Papua and Highland Papua) regularly uses koteka, and it is only used during a cultural festival or as a souvenir.

== Phallocrypts ==
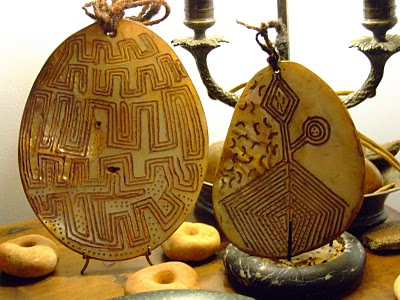
A Lonka Lonka, an ornate carved-pearl-shell type of phallocrypt worn by some Aboriginal peoples of Australia

Phallocrypts are decorative penis sheaths worn in parts of New Guinea during traditional ceremonies. They are usually made out of gourds or woven fibers and decorated with feathers, beads, cowry shells, and small metal ornaments. The most elaborate phallocrypts are sold to tourists as souvenirs and are not usually representative of ones used in ceremonies.

== Use in other regions ==
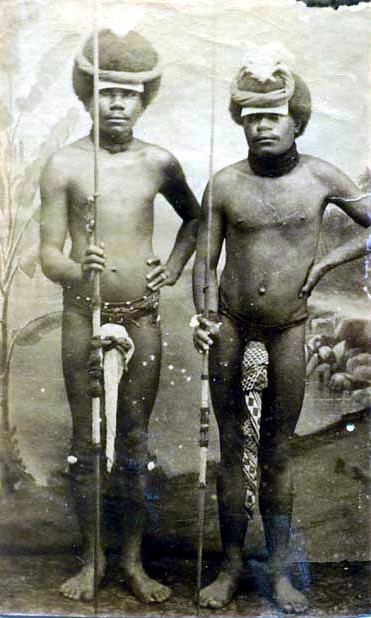
Two Kanak warriors posing with penis gourds and spears in New Caledonia, around 1880

The namba worn by some tribes in central Vanuatu is closely related to the koteka. It was also worn by the Kanak people of New Caledonia.

Some native tribes in South America and Africa have used penis sheaths.

== See also ==
- Codpiece
- Kynodesme
- Namba (clothing)
