= Western New Guinea =

Region of Indonesia

Western New Guinea Papua West Irian / Irian Jaya / West Papua
- Region
- Country: Indonesia
- Provinces: Central Papua (Wanggar, Nabire); Highland Papua (Jayawijaya); Papua (Jayapura); South Papua (Salor, Merauke); Southwest Papua (Sorong); West Papua (Manokwari)
- Largest cities: Jayapura; Sorong; Manokwari; Merauke; Nabire; Timika; Wamena

Area
  - Total: 412,214.61 km^{2} (159,156.95 sq mi)

Population (mid-2022 estimate)
  - Total: 5,601,888
  - Density: 13.58974/km^{2} (35.19726/sq mi)

Demographics
  - Ethnic groups: Papuans, Ambonese, Bugis, Butonese, Evav/Kei, Javanese, Makassar, Minahasa, Toraja
  - Languages: Indonesian (official), Papuan Malay (lingua franca) and others
- Time zone: UTC+09:00 (Indonesia Eastern Time)
- ISO 3166-2: ID-PP
- Vehicle registration plates: PA; PB; PG; PS; PT; PY

Western New Guinea, also known as Papua, Indonesian New Guinea, and Indonesian Papua, is the western half of the island of New Guinea, formerly Dutch and granted to Indonesia in 1962. Given the island is alternatively named Papua, the region is also called West Papua (Indonesian: Papua Barat). It is one of the seven geographical units of Indonesia in ISO 3166-2:ID.

Lying to the west of Papua New Guinea and geographically a part of the Australian continent, the territory is almost entirely in the Southern Hemisphere and includes the Biak and Raja Ampat archipelagoes. The region is predominantly covered with rainforest where traditional peoples live, including the Dani of the Baliem Valley. A large proportion of the population live in or near coastal areas. The largest city is Jayapura.

The island of New Guinea has been populated for tens of thousands of years. European traders began frequenting the region around the late 16th century due to spice trade. In the end, the Dutch Empire emerged as the dominant leader in the spice war, annexing the western part of New Guinea into the colony of Dutch East Indies. The Dutch remained in New Guinea until 1962, even though other parts of the former colony had declared independence as the Republic of Indonesia in 1945. Following negotiations and conflicts with the Indonesian government, the Dutch transferred Western New Guinea to a United Nations Temporary Executive Authority (UNTEA) in 1962, which was again transferred to Indonesia after the controversial Act of Free Choice in 1969.

The interior is predominantly populated by ethnic Papuans while coastal towns are inhabited by descendants of intermarriages between Papuans, Melanesians and Austronesians, including other Indonesian ethnic groups. Migrants from the rest of Indonesia also tend to inhabit the coastal regions. The province is also home to some uncontacted peoples. The seas surrounding New Guinea historically formed part of wider Southeast Asian maritime trade networks that connected the Indonesian archipelago to the Pacific and the Indian Ocean worlds.

In 2020, the region had a census population of 5,437,775, the majority of whom are indigenous; the official estimate as of mid-2022 was 5,601,888. It is currently governed as six autonomous provinces of Indonesia. The official language is Indonesian, with Papuan Malay the most used lingua franca. Estimates of the number of local languages in the region range from 200 to over 700, with the most widely spoken including Dani, Yali, Ekari and Biak. The predominant official religion is Christianity, followed by Islam. The main industries include agriculture, fishing, oil production, and mining. The province has a large potential in natural resources, such as gold, nickel, petroleum, etc.

== Name ==
Speakers align themselves with a political orientation when choosing a name for the western half of the island of New Guinea. The official name of the region is "Papua" according to the International Organization for Standardization (ISO). Independence activists refer to the region as "West Papua", while Indonesian officials have also used "West Papua" to name the western province of the region since 2007. Historically, the region has had the official names of Netherlands New Guinea (1895–1962), West New Guinea or West Irian (1962–1973), Irian Jaya (1973–2002), and Papua (2002–present). The expected Indonesian translation of "Western New Guinea", Nugini Barat, is currently only used in historical contexts such as kampanye Nugini Barat "Western New Guinea campaign".

== History ==
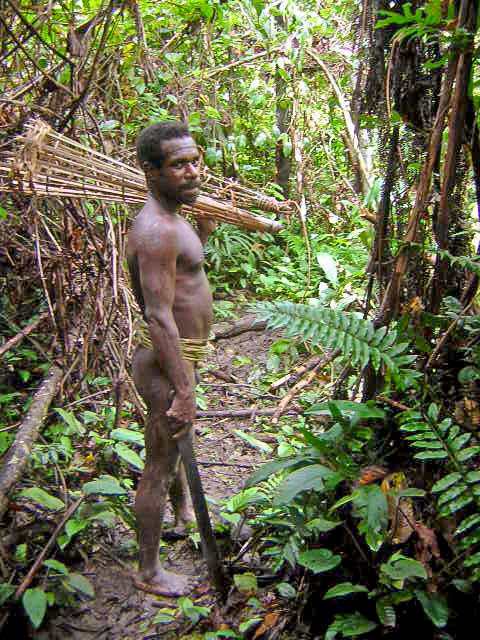
Before the 1970s, the Korowai people of Papua were an uncontacted people.

Human habitation is estimated to have begun over 50,000 years ago. Trade between New Guinea and neighbouring‌ Indonesian islands was documented as early as the seventh century, and archipelagic rule of New Guinea by the 13th. The Netherlands made claim to the region and commenced missionary work in nineteenth century. The region was incorporated into the Indonesian republic in the 1960s. Following the 1998 commencement of reforms across Indonesia, Papua and other Indonesian provinces received greater regional autonomy. In 2001, "Special Autonomy" status was granted to the region, although up to 2006, implementation had been partial. The region was divided in 2003 into the provinces of Papua and West Papua. In 2022, the new provinces of Central Papua, Highland Papua, South Papua, and Southwest Papua were created.

=== Etymology ===
Historical affiliations

Dutch East India Company 1640s–1799
Dutch East Indies 1800–1942; 1944–1949
Empire of Japan 1942–1944
Dutch New Guinea 1949–1962
UNTEA 1962–1963
Indonesia 1963–present

There are several theories regarding the origin of the word Papua. One theory is that the name comes from the word 'Papo Ua', named by the Tidore Sultanate, which in the Tidore language means "not joining" or "not being united", meaning that there was no king who rules the area. Before the age of colonization, the Tidore Sultanate controlled some parts of the Bird's Head Peninsula in what is now the provinces of West Papua and Southwest Papua before expanding to also include coastal regions in the current province of Papua. This relationship plays an important historical role in binding the archipelagic civilizations of Indonesia to the Papuan world. Another theory is that the word Papua comes from the Malay word 'papuwah', which means 'frizzled hair'. It was first mentioned in the 1812 Malay Dictionary by William Marsden, although it was not found in earlier dictionaries. In the records of 16th century Portuguese and Spanish sailors, the word 'Papua' is the designation for the inhabitants of the Raja Ampat Islands and the coastal parts of the Bird's Head Peninsula.

The former name of the province, Irian Jaya, was suggested during a tribal committee meeting in Tobati, Jayapura, formed by Atmoprasojo, head of the bestuur school in the 1940s. Frans Kaisiepo, the committee leader suggested the name from Mansren Koreri myths, Iri-an from the Biak language of Biak Island, meaning "hot land" referring to the local hot climate, but also from Iryan which means heated process as a metaphor for a land that is entering a new era. In Serui Iri-an (lit. land-nation) means "pillar of nation", while in Merauke Iri-an (lit. placed higher-nation) means "rising spirit" or "to rise". The name was promoted in 1945 by Marcus Kaisiepo, brother of the future governor Frans Kaisiepo. The name Irian was politicized later by Marthin Indey and Silas Papare with the Indonesian acronym 'Ikut Republik Indonesia Anti Nederland' (Join the Republic of Indonesia oppose the Netherlands). The name was used throughout the Suharto administration, until it was changed to Papua during the administration of President Abdurrahman Wahid.

The Dutch, who arrived later under Jacob Le Maire and Willem Schouten, called it Schouten island. They later used this name only to refer to islands off the north coast of Papua proper, the Schouten Islands or Biak Island. When the Dutch colonized this island as part of the Dutch East Indies, they called it Nieuw Guinea.

Speakers align themselves with a political orientation when choosing a name for the western half of the island of New Guinea. The official name of the region is "Papua" according to International Organization for Standardization (ISO). Independence activists refer to the region as "West Papua," while Indonesian officials have also used "West Papua" to name the westernmost province of the region since 2007. Historically, the region has had the official names of Netherlands New Guinea (1895–1962), West New Guinea or West Irian (1945–73), Irian Jaya (1973–2002), and Papua (2002–present).

=== Pre-colonial era ===
Papuan habitation of the region is estimated to have begun over 50,000 years ago. Research indicates that the highlands were an early and independent centre of agriculture, and show that agriculture developed gradually over several thousands of years; the banana has been cultivated in this region for at least 7,000 years. Austronesian peoples migrating through Maritime Southeast Asia settled in the area at least 3,000 years ago, and populated especially in Cenderawasih Bay. Diverse cultures and languages have developed in the island due to geographical isolation; there are over 300 languages and two hundred additional dialects in the region. (see Papuan languages, Austronesian languages, Central–Eastern Malayo-Polynesian languages)

As early as the 8th century, the Chinese mention of a land known as Tungki, which was a source of spices and may have referred to New Guinea. Meanwhile, around 600 AD, the Sumatra-based empire of Srivijaya referred to the island as Janggi. The empire engaged in trade relations with western New Guinea, initially taking items like sandalwood and birds-of-paradise in tribute to China, but later making slaves out of the Papuan people. They were followed by Chinese traders, as well as several from the Middle East. It is also believed that Indian sailors from ancient times gave the island the name of Samudrananta, which means 'at edge of the ocean'.

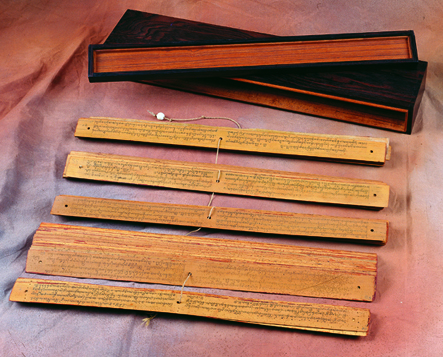
The Nagarakertagama mentioned a region in the east called Wanin, present-day Onin Peninsula in the Fakfak Regency, West Papua

The 14th-century Majapahit poem Nagarakretagama mentioned Wwanin or Onin and Sran as a recognized territory in the east, today identified as Onin peninsula in Fakfak Regency in the western part of the larger Bomberai Peninsula south of the Bird's Head Peninsula. At that time, Papua was said to be the eighth region of the Majapahit Empire.

Wwanin was probably the oldest name in recorded history to refer to the western part of the island of New Guinea. The pronunciation of the word gradually shifted over the centuries to Onin,^{:69} according to Rumphius notes from the 17th century, Ternate people called the area Woni. Meanwhile, Sran refers to an ancient local kingdom of Sran Eman Muun, located in the southern part of Bomberai Peninsula called Koiwai (modern day Kaimana Regency), which was the predecessor of local Papuan kingdoms in the area.

A transcript from the Nagarakretagama says the following:

Ikang sakasanusasanusa Makasar Butun Banggawai Kuni Ggaliyao mwang i [ng] Salaya Sumba Solot Muar muwah tigang i Wandan Ambwan Athawa maloko Ewanin ri Sran ini Timur ning angeka nusatutur.

According to some linguists, the word Ewanin is another name for Onin as recorded in old communal poems or songs from Wersar, while Sran popularly misunderstood to refers to Seram Island in Maluku, is more likely another name for a local Papuan kingdom which in its native language is called Sran Eman Muun, based in Kaimana and its furthest influence extends to the Kei Islands, in southeastern Maluku.

Various tribes near the area, and local kingdoms from Rumbati to Patipi Bay, claimed descent of ancient Javanese migrants or past interactions with Java. For example, the Kondjol/Onim clan of Tehit people claimed to have ancient heirloom (traditionally called Qya-Trifan to explain their origin and usually kept secret) consisting of a buddha statue and kris and claimed their ancestor Onain fled Java to New Guinea through Maluku with the ancestor of Anggiluli fleeing religious persecution. Meanwhile, Rumbati Kingdom of the Bauw clan was claimed to have been founded by a Javanese sailor called Bau from Gresik who married an Anggiluli woman and a Koiwai woman. His son Nawa-Nawa Bauw later became king of Rumbati, while his other son, Mnau founded the Ati-ati Kingdom. Both of these kingdom with Fatagar Kingdom, whose ancestors were either descended from kings of Ugar Island or Baik Mountains (like ancestors of Sran kings) formed the three primary kingdoms of the Onin area.^{:242}

=== 16th century ===
From at least the 15th century (or even earlier), Southeast Asian Muslim merchants and Papuans interacted for trade. From Sultanates located in the Moluccas, Muslim merchants developed exclusive trading ties with the natives of West Papua by the 17th century. Around the 16th century, knowledge of ironworking reached the region, introduced by Muslims from Maluku.

In 1511, Antonio d'Arbau, a Portuguese sailor, called the Papua region as "Os Papuas" or Ilha de Papo. Don Jorge de Menetes, a sailor from Spain also stopped by in Papua a few years later (1526–1527), he refers to the region as 'Papua', which was mentioned in the diary of Antonio Pigafetta, the clerk for the Magellan voyage. The name Papua was known to Pigafetta when he stopped on the island of Tidore.

On 16 May 1545, Yñigo Ortiz de Retez, a Spanish maritime explorer in command of the San Juan de Letran, left port in Tidore, a Spanish stronghold in the Maluku Islands and going by way of the Talaud Islands and the Schoutens, reached the northern coast of New Guinea, which was coasted till the end of August when, owing to the 5°S latitude, contrary winds and currents, forcing a return to Tidore arriving on 5 October 1545. Many islands were encountered and first charted, along the northern coast of New Guinea, and in the Padaidos, Le Maires, Ninigos, Kaniets and Hermits, to some of which Spanish names were given. On 20 June 1545 at the mouth of the Mamberamo River (charted as San Agustin) he took possession of the land for the Spanish Crown, in the process giving the island the name by which it is known today. He called it Nueva Guinea owing to the resemblance of the local inhabitants to the peoples of the Guinea coast in West Africa.

In his book Nieuw Guinea, Dutch author WC. Klein explained the beginning of the influence of the Bacan Sultanate in Papua. There he wrote: In 1569 Papoese hoof den bezoeken Batjan. Ee aanterijken worden vermeld (In 1569, Papuan tribal leaders visited Bacan, which resulted in the creation of new kingdoms). According to the oral history of the Biak people, there used to be a relationship and marriage between their tribal chiefs and the sultans of Tidore in connection with Gurabesi, a naval leader of Waigeo from Biak. The Biak people is the largest Melanesian tribe, spread on the northern coast of Papua, making the Biak language widely used and considered the language of Papuan unity. Due to the relationship of the coastal areas of Papua with the Sultans of Maluku, there are several local kingdoms on this island, which shows the entry of feudalism.

Near the end of the sixteenth century, the Sultanate of Ternate under Sultan Baabullah (1570–1583) had influence over parts of Papua. Since the 16th century, apart from the Raja Ampat Islands which was contested between the Bacan Sultanate, Tidore Sultanate, and Ternate Sultanate, other coastal areas of Papua from the island of Biak to Mimika became vassals of the Tidore Sultanate. The Tidore Sultanate adheres to the trade pact and custom of Uli-Siwa (federation of nine), there were nine trade partners led by Tidore in opposition to the Ternate-led Uli Lima (federation of five). In administering its regions in Papua, Tidore divide them to three regions, Korano Ngaruha ( lit. Four Kings ) or Raja Ampat Islands, Papoua Gam Sio ( lit. Papua The Nine Negeri ) and Mafor Soa Raha ( lit. Mafor The Four Soa ). The role of these kingdoms began to decline due to the entry of traders from Europe to the archipelago marking the beginning of colonialism in the Indonesian Archipelago. During Tidore's rule, the main exports of the island during this period were resins, spices, slaves and the highly priced feathers of the bird-of-paradise. Sultan Nuku, one of the most famous Tidore sultans who rebelled against Dutch colonization, called himself "Sultan of Tidore and Papua", during his revolt in the 1780s. He commanded loyalty from both Moluccan and Papuan chiefs, especially those of Raja Ampat Islands. Following Tidore's defeat, much of the territory it claimed in western part of New Guinea came under Dutch rule as part of the Dutch East Indies.

=== European colonisation ===
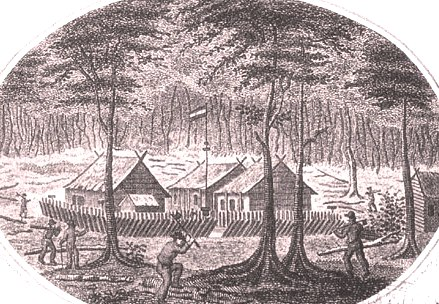
Fort Du Bus in 1828

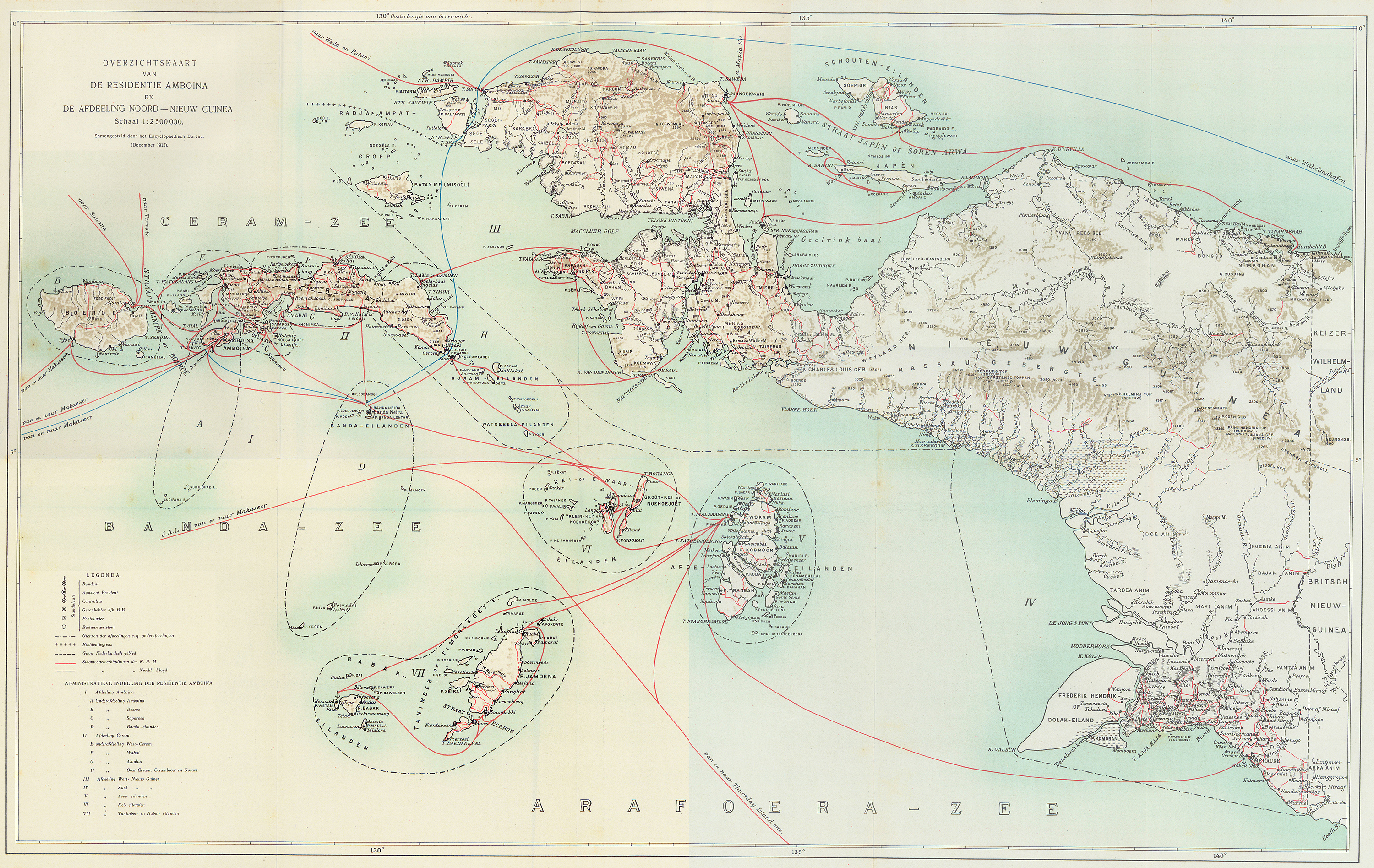
Dutch expeditions in Netherlands New Guinea 1907–1915.

The first map showing the whole island as an island was published in 1600 and shown 1606, Luís Vaz de Torres explored the southern coast of New Guinea from Milne Bay to the Gulf of Papua including Orangerie Bay, which he named Bahía de San Lorenzo. His expedition also discovered Basilaki Island, naming it Tierra de San Buenaventura, which he claimed for Spain in July 1606. On 18 October, his expedition reached the western part of the island in present-day Indonesia, and also claimed the territory for the King of Spain.

In 1606, a Duyfken expedition led by the commander Wiliam Jansen from Holland landed in Papua. This expedition consisted of 3 ships, where they sailed from the north coast of Java and stopped at the Kei Islands, at the southwestern coast of Papua. With the increasing Dutch grip in the region, the Spanish left New Guinea in 1663. In 1660, the Dutch recognized the Sultan of Tidore's sovereignty over New Guinea. New Guinea thus became notionally Dutch as the Dutch held power over Tidore.

In 1793, Britain established a settlement near Manokwari. However, it failed. By 1824 Britain and the Netherlands agreed that the western half of the island would become part of the Dutch East Indies. Dutch New Guinea in the early 19th century was administered from the Moluccas. Although the coast had been mapped in 1825 by Lieutenant Commander D.H. Kolff, there had been no serious effort to establish a permanent presence in Dutch New Guinea. The British, however, had shown considerable interest in the area, and were threatening to settle it. To prevent this, the Governor of the Moluccas, Pieter Merkus, urged the Dutch government to establish posts along the coast. An administrative and trading post established in 1828 on Triton Bay on the southwest coast of New Guinea. On 24 August 1828, the birthday of King William I of the Netherlands, the Dutch flag was hoisted and the Dutch claimed all of Western New Guinea, which they called Nieuw Guinea Several native chieftains proclaimed their loyalty to the Netherlands. The post was named Fort Du Bus for the then-Governor General of the Dutch East Indies, Leonard du Bus de Gisignies. 30 years later, Germans established the first missionary settlement on Mansinam Island, near Manokwari. While in 1828 the Dutch claimed the south coast west of the 141st meridian and the north coast west of Humboldt Bay in 1848, they did not try to develop the region again until 1896; they established settlements in Manokwari and Fak-Fak in response to perceived Australian ownership claims from the eastern half of New Guinea. Great Britain and Germany had recognized the Dutch claims in treaties of 1885 and 1895. At the same time, Britain claimed south-east New Guinea, later as the Territory of Papua, and Germany claimed the northeast, later known as the Territory of New Guinea. The German, Dutch and British colonial administrators each attempted to suppress the still-widespread practices of inter-village warfare and headhunting within their respective territories. In 1901, the Netherlands formally purchased West New Guinea from the Sultanate of Tidore, incorporating it into the Netherlands East Indies.

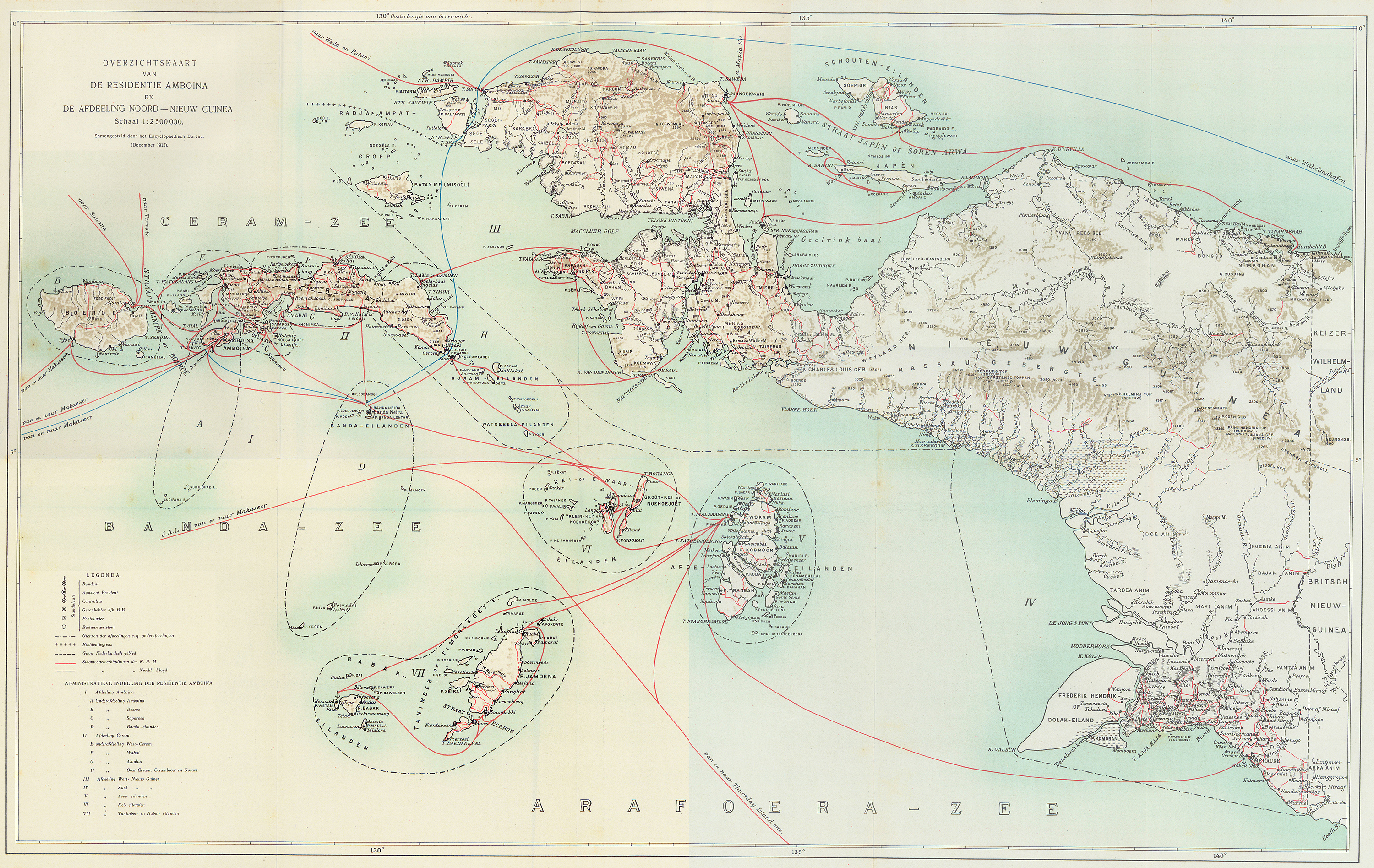
Dutch expeditions in Netherlands New Guinea 1907–1915.

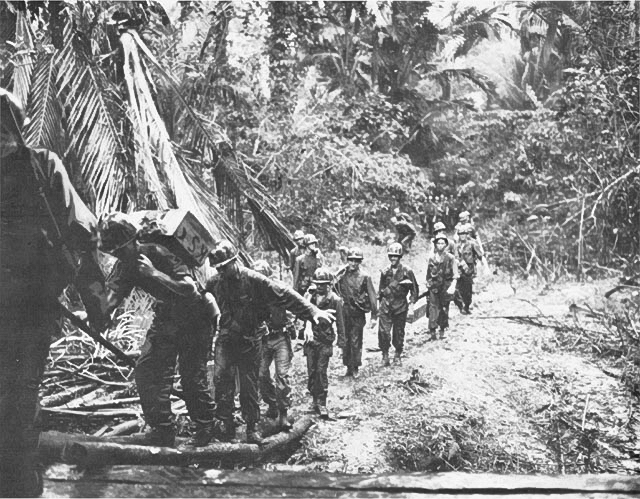
U.S. troops landing in Tanahmerah Bay during Operation Reckless, 1944

Dutch activity in the region remained in the first half of the twentieth century, notwithstanding the 1923 establishment of the Nieuw Guinea Beweging (New Guinea Movement) in the Netherlands by ultra right-wing supporters calling for Dutchmen to create a tropical Netherlands in Papua. This pre-war movement without full government support was largely unsuccessful in its drive, but did coincide with the development of a plan for Eurasian settlement of the Dutch Indies to establish Dutch farms in northern West New Guinea. This effort also failed as most returned to Java disillusioned, and by 1938 just 50 settlers remained near Hollandia and 258 in Manokwari. Overall, during their reign, the Dutch mostly regarded West New Guinea as a "wasteland, fit only for political exiles and unwanted officials". The Dutch established the Boven Digul camp in Tanahmerah, as a prison for Indonesian nationalists. Among those interned here were writer Marco Kartodikromo, Mohammad Hatta, who would become the first vice president of Indonesia, and Sutan Sjahrir, the first Indonesian Prime Minister. The Dutch authorities never had effective control over the whole territory. By 1937, they only administered one third of the estimated population, and were mostly limited to coastal areas.

Before about 1930, European maps showed the highlands as uninhabited forests. When first flown over by aircraft, numerous settlements with agricultural terraces and stockades were observed. The most startling discovery took place on 4 August 1938, when Richard Archbold discovered the Grand Valley of the Baliem River, which had 50,000 yet-undiscovered Stone Age farmers living in villages. The people, known as the Dani, were the last society of its size to make first contact with the rest of the world.

=== World War II ===
The region became important in World War II with the Pacific War upon the Netherlands' declaration of war on Japan after the bombing of Pearl Harbor. In 1942, the northern coast of West New Guinea and the nearby islands were occupied by Japan. By late 1942, most of the Netherlands Indies were occupied by Japan. Behind Japanese lines in New Guinea, Dutch guerrilla fighters resisted under Mauritz Christiaan Kokkelink.

In 1944, forces led by American general Douglas MacArthur launched a four-phase campaign from neighbouring Papua New Guinea to liberate Dutch New Guinea from the Japanese. Phase 1 was the capture of Hollandia (now Jayapura). Involving 80,000 Allied troops, it was the largest amphibious operation of the war in the southwest Pacific. Phase 2 was the capture of Sarmi and was met with strong Japanese resistance. The capture of Biak to control the airfield and nearby Numfor was Phase 3. Hard battles were fought on Biak which was exacerbated by Allied intelligence underestimating the strength of Japanese forces. The fourth and final phase was the push to Japanese airbases on Morotai and towards the Philippines. The Allies also fought for control of Merauke as they feared it could be used as a base for Japanese air attacks against Australia.

Allied forces drove out the Japanese after Operations Reckless and Persecution, with amphibious landings near Hollandia, from 21 April 1944. The area served as MacArthur's headquarters until the conquest of the Philippines in March 1945. Over twenty U.S. bases were established and half a million US personnel moved through the area. West New Guinean farms supplied food for the half million US troops. Papuan men went into battle to carry the wounded, acted as guides and translators, and provided a range of services, from construction work and carpentry to serving as machine shop workers and mechanics. Following the end of the war, the Dutch retained possession of West New Guinea from 1945.

=== Preparing for independence ===
In 1944, Jan van Eechoud set up a school for bureaucrats in Hollandia (now Jayapura). One early headmaster of the school was Soegoro Atmoprasojo, an Indonesian nationalist graduate of Taman Siswa and former Boven-Digoel prisoners, in one of these meetings the name "Irian" was suggested. Many of these school early graduates would go on to found Indonesian independence movement in Western New Guinea, while some went on to support Dutch authorities and pursue Papuan independence. In December 1945, Atmoprasojo alongside his students were planning for a rebellion, however Dutch authorities would be alerted by a defecting member of Papuan Battalion on 14 December 1945, utilising forces from Rabaul, Dutch authorities would also capture 250 people possibly involved in this attack. The news of Indonesian independence proclamation arrived in New Guinea primarily through shipping labourers associated with Sea Transport Union of Indonesia (Sarpelindo), who were working for ships under the flag of Australian and the Dutch. This led to the formation of the Komite Indonesia Merdeka or KIM branch in Abepura, Hollandia in October 1946, originally an organization for Indonesian exiles in Sydney. It was led by J.A. Gerungan, a doctor who led an Abepura hospital, by December 1946, it came to be led by Martin Indey. KIM was one of the first Indonesian nationalist groups in New Guinea, whose members were mostly former associates of Soegoro. Simultaneously another separate Indonesian nationalist movement in New Guinea formed when Sam Ratulangi, was exiled at Serui, along with his six staff by the Netherlands Indies Civil Administration on 5 July 1946. In exile he met with Silas Papare who was also exiled from a failed Pagoncang Alam led rebellion to free Atmoprasojo, on 29 November 1946, an organization called Indonesian Irian Independence Party (PKII) was formed. A year later, on 17 August 1947, former students of Soegoro and others would held a red and white flag-raising ceremony to commemorate the Indonesian independence day.

KIM and PKII members began to start movements in other areas of New Guinea, most of these were unsuccessful, and the perpetrators were either imprisoned or killed. In Manokwari, a movement called Red and White Movement was founded, which was led by Petrus Walebong and Samuel D. Kawab. This movement later spread to Babo, Kokas, Fakfak, and Sorong. In Biak, a local branch of KIM was joined with Perserikatan Indonesia Merdeka which was formed earlier in September 1945 under the leadership of Lukas Rumkorem. Lukas would be captured and exiled to Hollandia, with the charge he instigated violence among local population accused of trying to kill Frans Kaisiepo and Marcus Kaisiepo. Still the movement did not disappear in Biak, Stevanus Yoseph together with Petero Jandi, Terianus Simbiak, Honokh Rambrar, Petrus Kaiwai and Hermanus Rumere on 19 March 1948, instigate another revolt. Dutch authorities had to send reinforcements from Jayapura. The Dutch imposed a harder penalty, with capital punishment for Petro Jandi, and a life sentence to Stevanus Yoseph. Meanwhile, another organization was formed on the 17 August 1947, called the Association of Young Men of Indonesia under the leadership of Abraham Koromath.

Around the Bomberai Peninsula area of Fakfak, specifically in Kokas, an Indonesian nationalist movement was led by Machmud Singgirei Rumagesan. On 1 March 1946, he ordered that all the Dutch's flags in Kokas to be changed into Indonesian flags. He was later imprisoned in Doom Island, Sorong, where he managed to recruit some followers as well as the support from local Sangaji Malan Dutch authorities later aided by incoming troops from Sorong arrested the King Rumagesan and he was given capital punishment. Meanwhile, in Kaimana, King Muhammad Achmad Aituarauw founded an organization called Independence With Kaimana, West Irian (MBKIB), which similarly boycotted Dutch flags every 31 August. In response of this activity, Aituarauw was arrested by the Dutch and exiled to Ayamaru for 10 years in 1948. Other movements opposing the Dutch under local Papuan kings includes, New Guinea Islamic Union led by Ibrahim Bauw, King of Rumbati, Gerakan Pemuda Organisasi Muda led by Machmud Singgirei Rumagesan and Abbas Iha, and Persatuan Islam Kaimana of Kaimana led by Usman Saad and King of Namatota, Umbair.

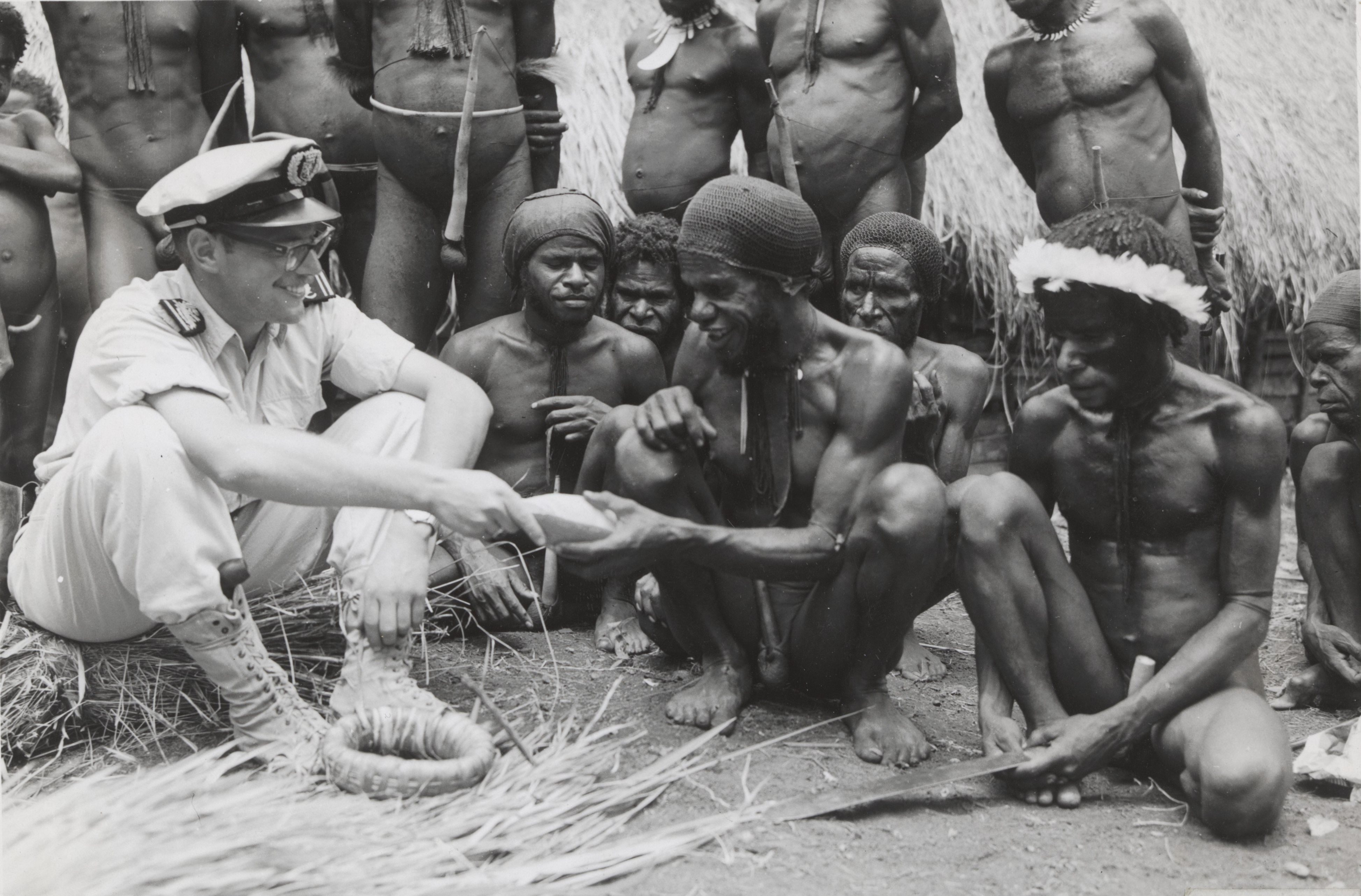
Dutch colonial civil servant in the Baliem Valley, 1958

Following the Indonesian National Revolution, the Netherlands formally transferred sovereignty to the United States of Indonesia, on 27 December 1949. However, the Dutch refused to include Netherlands New Guinea in the new Indonesian Republic and took steps to prepare it for independence as a separate country. Following the failure of the Dutch and Indonesians to resolve their differences over West New Guinea during the Dutch-Indonesian Round Table Conference in late 1949, it was decided that the present status quo of the territory would be maintained and then negotiated bilaterally one year after the date of the transfer of sovereignty. However, both sides were still unable to resolve their differences in 1950, which led the Indonesian President Sukarno to accuse the Dutch of reneging on their promises to negotiate the handover of the territory. On 17 August 1950, Sukarno dissolved the United States of Indonesia and proclaimed the unitary Republic of Indonesia. Indonesia also began to initiate incursions to New Guinea in 1952, though most of these efforts would be unsuccessful. Most of these failed infiltrators would be sent to Boven-Digoel which would form clandestine intelligence groups working from the primarily southern part of New Guinea in preparation for war.

In December 1950 the United Nations requested the Special Committee on Decolonization to accept transmission of information regarding the territory in accord with Article 73 of the Charter of the United Nations. After repeated Indonesian claims to possession of Dutch New Guinea, the Netherlands invited Indonesia to present its claim before an International Court of Law. Indonesia declined the offer. In attempt to prevent Indonesia taking control of the region, the Dutch significantly raised development spending off its low base, and encouraged Papuan nationalism. The Dutch began building schools and colleges to train professional skills with the aim of preparing them for self-rule by 1970. A naval academy was opened in 1956, and Papuan troops and naval cadets began service by 1957. A small western elite developed with a growing political awareness attuned to the idea of independence and close links to neighbouring‌ eastern New Guinea (which was then administered by Australia.) Local Council elections were held and Papuan representatives elected from 1955. Throughout the 1950s, government expenditures more than tripled, and Papuan enrolments in schools increased by over 50%. However, the Dutch did little to improve the areas which were not under their control, which by 1954, contained to half the overall population.

Following the defeat of the third Afro-Asian resolution in November 1957, the Indonesian government embarked on a national campaign targeting Dutch interests in Indonesia; A total of 700 Dutch-owned companies with a valuation total of around $1.5 billion was nationalised. By January 1958, ten thousand Dutch nationals had left Indonesia, many returning to the Netherlands. By June 1960, around thirteen thousand Dutch nationals mostly Eurasians from New Guinea left for Australia, with around a thousand moving to the Netherlands. Following a sustained period of harassment against Dutch diplomatic representatives in Jakarta, the Indonesian government formally severed relations with the Netherlands in August 1960.

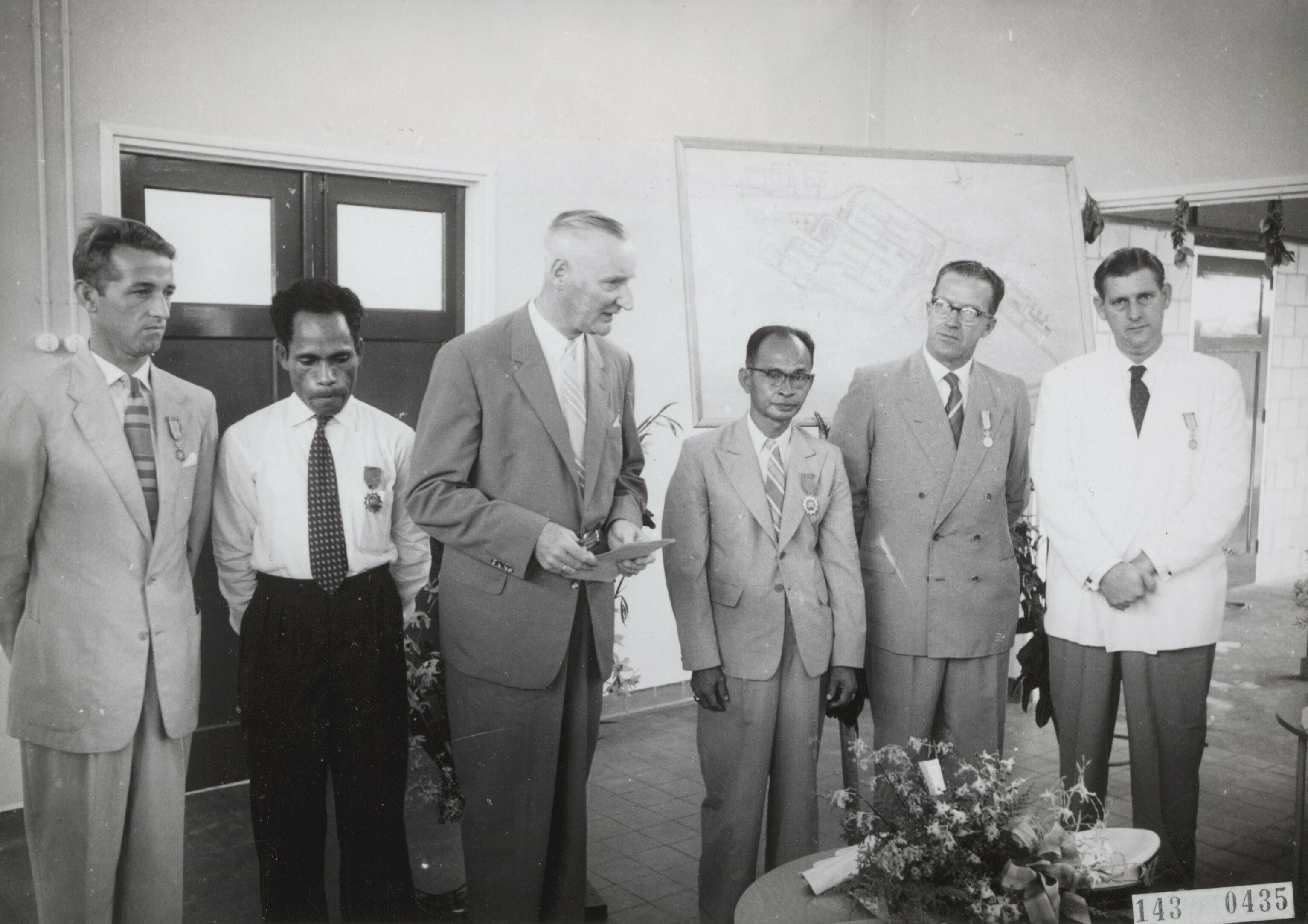
Dutch and Papuan officials during the opening of the Central Hospital in Hollandia, 1959

In response to Indonesian aggression, the Netherlands government stepped up its efforts to prepare the Papuan people for self-determination in 1959. These efforts culminated in the establishment of a hospital in Hollandia (modern–day Jayapura, currently Jayapura Regional General Hospital or RSUD Jayapura), a shipyard in Manokwari, agricultural research sites, plantations, and a military force known as the Papuan Volunteer Corps. By 1960, a legislative New Guinea Council had been established with a mixture of legislative, advisory and policy functions. Half of its members were to be elected, and elections for this council were held the following year. Most importantly, the Dutch also sought to create a sense of West Papuan national identity, and these efforts led to the creation of a national flag (the Morning Star flag), a national anthem, and a coat of arms. The Dutch had planned to transfer independence to West New Guinea in 1970.

After news that the Hague was considering a United States plan to turn over the territory to United Nations administration, Papuan Councillors met for six hours in the New Guinea Council building on 19 October 1961 to elect a National Committee which drafted a Manifesto for Independence & Self-government, a National flag (Morning Star), State Seal, selected a national anthem ("Oh My Land Papua"), and called for the people to be known as Papuans. The New Guinea Council voted unanimous support of these proposals on 30 October 1961, and on 31 October 1961 presented the Morning Star flag and Manifesto to Governor Platteel, who recognized the flag and anthem on 18 November 1961, and these ordinances came into effect on 1 December 1961.

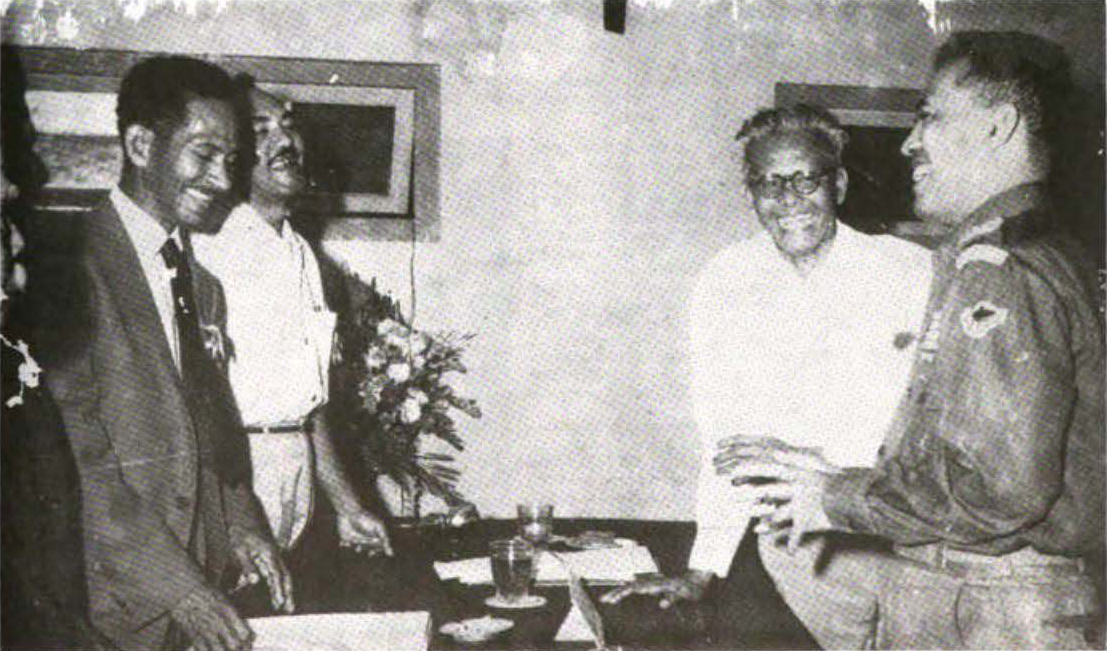
M.S. Rumagesan, Silas Papare, N.L.Suwages, Soegoro Atmoprasodjo, and A.H. Nasution in Putra-putra Irian Barat ('Sons of Irian Barat') Conference in Cibogo Bogor, 14–15 April 1961

Following the raising of the Papuan National Flag on 1 December 1961, tensions further escalated. Multiple rebellions erupted inside New Guinea against Dutch authorities, such as in Enarotali, Agats, Kokas, Merauke, Sorong and Baliem Valley. On 18 December 1961 Sukarno issued the Tri Komando Rakjat (People's Triple Command), calling the Indonesian people to defeat the formation of an independent state of West Papua, raise the Indonesian flag in the territory, and be ready for mobilisation at any time. In 1962 Indonesia launched a significant campaign of airborne and seaborne infiltrations against the disputed territory, beginning with a seaborne infiltration launched by Indonesian forces on 15 January 1962. The Indonesian attack was defeated by Dutch forces including the Dutch destroyers Evertsen and Kortenaer, the so-called Vlakke Hoek incident. Amongst the casualties was the Indonesian Deputy Chief of the Naval Staff; Commodore Yos Sudarso.

=== Indonesian annexation ===
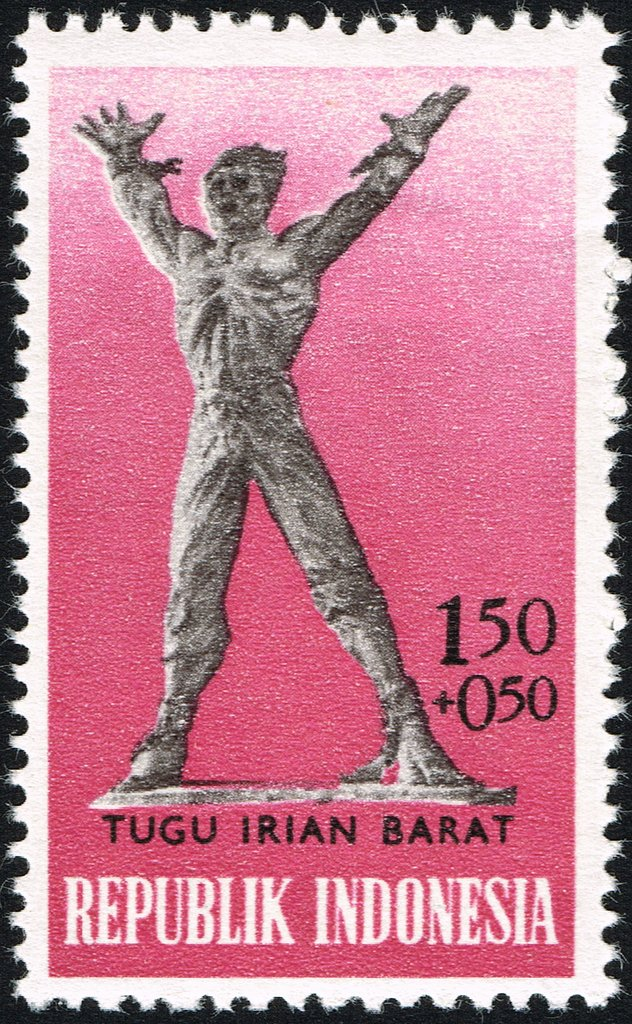
The Sukarno-era West Irian Liberation Monument in Lapangan Banteng, Jakarta.

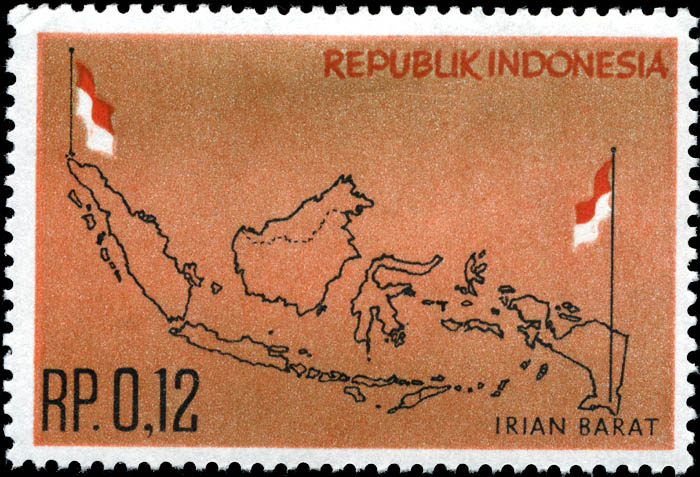
Rp 0.12 Indonesian stamp of 1963.

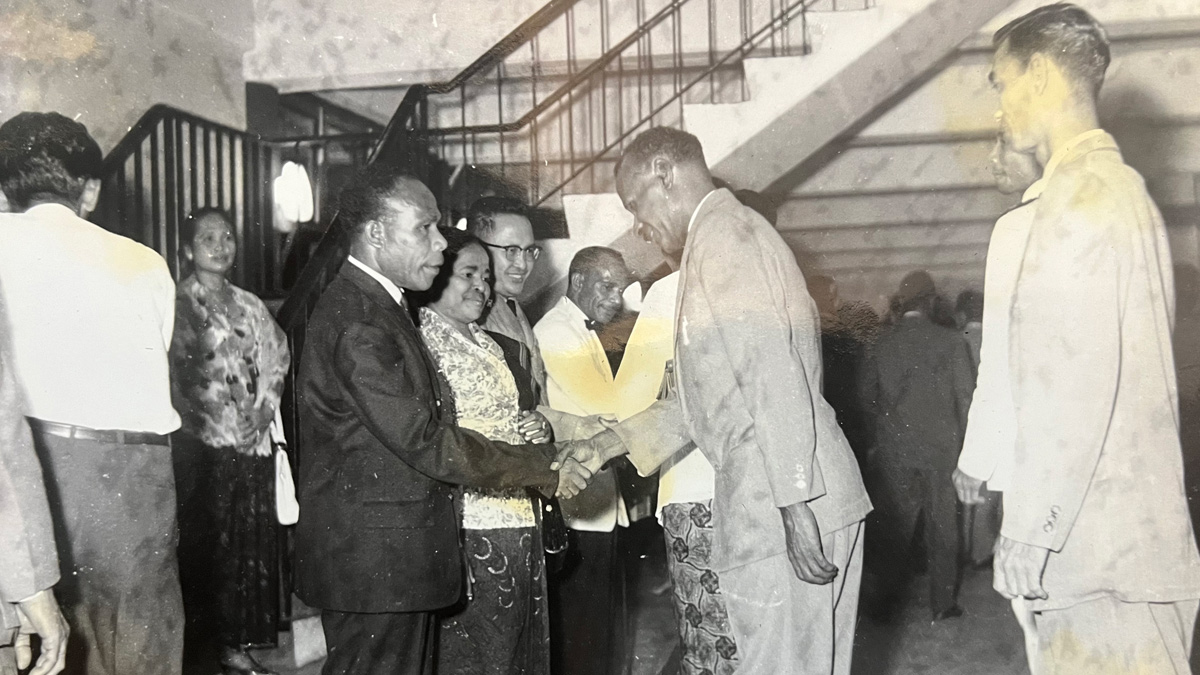
Handover ceremony of West Irian Governorship from Jan Bonay to Frans Kaisiepo, 1965

Sukarno made the takeover of Western New Guinea a focus of his continuing struggle against Dutch imperialism and part of a broader Third World conflict with the West. Both of Sukarno's key pillars of support, the Communist Party of Indonesia and Indonesian army supported his expansionism. In December 1961, President Sukarno created a Supreme Operations Command for the "liberation of Irian". In January 1962, Suharto, recently promoted to major General, was appointed to lead Operation Mandala, a joint army-navy-air force command. This formed the military side of the Indonesian campaign to win the territory. Indonesian forces had previously infiltrated the territory using small boats from nearby islands. Operations Pasukan Gerilya 100 (November 1960) and Pasukan Gerilya 200 (September 1961), were followed around the time of Suharto's appointment by Pasukan Gerilya 300 with 115 troops leaving Jakarta on four Jaguar class torpedo boats (15 January). They were intercepted in the Aru Sea and the lead boat was sunk. 51 survivors were picked up after flotilla commander Commodore Yos Sudarso went down with his boat. Parachute drops were made onto the swampy south coast away from the main concentration of Dutch forces. The commandos were thwarted by tall trees on which they were snared and by the swampy terrain, and much equipment was lost or damaged. Having been prepared for eventual independence by the Dutch, Papuan fighters attacked the paratroopers or handed them over to Dutch authorities. Of the 1,429 paratroopers, 216 were KIA or MIA, and 296 were captured.

Although Indonesian seaborne and paratroop incursions into the territory met with little success, the Dutch knew that a military campaign to retain the region would require protracted jungle warfare, and, unwilling to see a repeat of their futile efforts in the armed struggle for Indonesian independence in the 1940s, agreed to American mediation. Supporting the secret talks was the new American president, John F Kennedy, who said that compromise "will inevitably be unsatisfactory in some degree to both sides", and wrote to the then Dutch Prime Minister Jan de Quay, encouraging the Netherlands to relinquish control of Western New Guinea to Indonesia and warning of Indonesia's potential alliance with communist powers if Sukarno was not appeased. Kennedy took the advice of American ambassador to Indonesia, Howard Jones, and that of his own National Security Council, which was counter to the views of the Dutch and the CIA. Kennedy sent his brother Robert to Jakarta to solicit entry into negotiations without pre-conditions. Sukarno had hinted at releasing Allen Pope, who was sentenced to death for bombing Ambon four years previously, however, he now offered to release Pope in exchange for America's support against the Dutch.

In July 1962, Suharto's Mandala Command was preparing to resolve the military campaign with a major combined air and sea assault on the trade and communications centre of Biak Island, which was the location of a Dutch military base and the only jet airstrip. However, this risky operation did not eventuate as continuing US efforts to have the Netherlands secretly negotiate the transfer of the territory to Indonesian administration succeeded in creating the "New York Agreement", which was signed on 15 August 1962. The Australian government, which had previously supported Papuan independence, also reversed its policy to support incorporation with Indonesia.

The vaguely worded agreement, ratified in the UN on 21 September 1962, required authority to be transferred to a United Nations Temporary Executive Authority (UNTEA) on 1 October 1962, and that once UNTEA had informed the public of the terms of the Agreement, administration of the territory would transfer to Indonesia after 1 May 1963, until such time as Indonesia allowed the Papuans to determine whether they wanted independence or be part of Indonesia. On 1 May 1963, UNTEA transferred total administration of West New Guinea to the Republic of Indonesia. The capital Hollandia was renamed Kota Baru for the transfer to Indonesian administration and on 5 September 1963, West Irian was declared a "quarantine territory" with Foreign Minister Subandrio administering visitor permits.

The agreement stated that by 1969 the United Nations should oversee a referendum of the Papuan people, in which they would be given two options: to remain part of Indonesia or to become an independent nation. For a period of time, Dutch New Guinea were under the United Nations Temporary Executive Authority, before being transferred to Indonesia in 1963. A referendum was held in 1969 under the new president Suharto, which was referred locally as PEPERA shortened from Penentuan Pendapat Rakyat (Determination of the People's Opinion) or Act of Free Choice by independence activists. This referendum was held according to parameters set in Article XVIII of the final version of the New York Agreement, in which the will of the population would be assessed through a musyawarah or traditional consensus. The referendum was recognized by the international community and the region became the Indonesian province of Irian Jaya.

The 1,026 elders were hand-picked by the Indonesian government out of an estimated population of 800,000 as the Western New Guinea representatives for the vote. The men were given gifts of clothing and cigarettes, any who protested were hauled away and beaten. The General announced that the representatives had voted "unanimously" for integration.

I witnessed the event [the 'Act of Free Choice' in 1969] and saw the hypocrisy of world politics and felt the numbing sadness of a people being taken over by another race.

I lost count of the number of Papuans who, under cover of darkness, thrust letters under my arm or furtively into my hand. I lost count of the number of desperate, appealing letters left in my room or hidden in big shells given to me by Papuans so afraid that Indonesia might find out they had communicated with a journalist.

Some of the letters were soaked in blood, one carried 5000 names, and all spoke of living in fear of the Indonesian Army.

— Hugh Lunn, "Showing we're ready to appease", The Australian, 13 October 1976

This has been characterised as an act of "legitimised forced incorporation" into the Republic of Indonesia. However, in the traditional political culture of the Papuan people themselves, there is a system known as noken, primarily within communities in the central highlands of Papua although similar systems are practiced elsewhere in Melanesia, in which the decisions of a tribe, clan, or village, is represented by the tribal chief or the big man. Soon after, as of United Nations Resolution 2504 (XXIV) the region became the 26th province of Indonesia. The 1969 Act of Free Choice is considered contentious, with even United Nations observers recognizing the elders were placed under duress and forced to vote yes.

While several international observers including journalists and diplomats criticized the referendum as being rigged, the U.S. and Australia support Indonesia's efforts to secure acceptance in the United Nations for the pro-integration vote. That same year, 84 member states voted in favour for the United Nations to accept the result, with 30 others abstaining. Due to the Netherlands' efforts to promote a West Papuan national identity, a significant number of Papuans refused to accept the territory's integration into Indonesia. These formed the separatist Organisasi Papua Merdeka (Free Papua Movement) and have waged an insurgency against the Indonesian authorities, which continues to this day.

=== Province of Indonesia ===
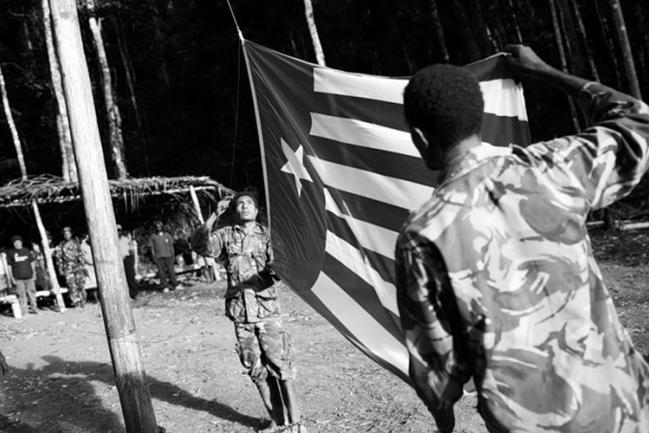
West Papuan separatists raising the Morning-Star flag in the jungles of Papua, 1971

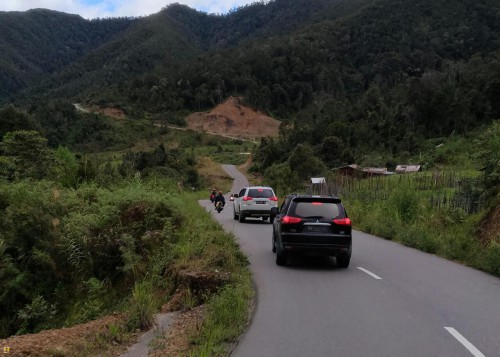
A section of Trans-Papua Highway connecting Deiyai and Mimika in Central Papua

In 1980, the Trans Irian Jaya Highway, currently Trans-Papua Highway, began construction. The highway would link unconnected cities and regions across the region, which were previously only accessible by sea or, for inland areas, by air. However, some experts suggested prioritizing development of local indigenous people over infrastructure development in order to be parallel with non-Papuan migrants, who were progressively inhabiting Western New Guinea's cities at the time.

From the first days of integration to Indonesia, some of the people in the region refused to be part of Indonesia and have pushed for independence ever since. Opposition to Indonesian rule stems from Indonesian government policies applied to the province. The two main factors are "a forced campaign of Indonesianisation and a complete disregard for the material and social welfare of West Papuans". There are regular mass protests throughout West Papua in support of independence but the Indonesian military and police often use lethal force to disperse them. The Free Papua Movement (OPM) was set up to provide a formal resistance towards Indonesian rule. Local and international protest followed the impact of human rights abuses and transmigration by other Indonesians into the region. Since the 1960s, consistent reports have filtered out of the territory of government suppression and terrorism, including murder, political assassination, imprisonment, torture, and aerial bombing. The Indonesian government disbanded the New Guinea Council and forbade the use of the West Papua flag or the singing of the national anthem. There has been resistance to Indonesian integration, both through civil disobedience (such as Morning Star flag raising ceremonies) and via the formation of the Organisasi Papua Merdeka (OPM, or Free Papua Movement) in 1965. Estimates vary significantly on the total death toll of West Papuans by the Indonesian military. Many West Papuans and international organisations describe the situation in West Papua as "genocide". A Sydney University academic has estimated more than 100,000 Papuans, one sixteenth of the population, have died as a result of government-sponsored violence against West Papuans, while others had previously specified much higher death tolls. An increasingly common figure being used is 500,000 people Rebellions occurred in remote mountainous areas in 1969, 1977, and the mid-1980s, occasionally spilling over into Papua New Guinea.

In the 1970s and 1980s, the Indonesian government accelerated its transmigration program, under which tens of thousands of Javanese and Sumatran migrants were resettled to Papua. Prior to Indonesian rule, the non-indigenous population was estimated at 16,600; while the Papuan population were a mix of Roman Catholics, Protestants and animists following tribal religions. The transmigration program officially ended in the late 1990s. An independence congress in 2000 calling for independence resulted in a military crackdown of independence supporters.

=== 21st century ===
Since 2002, display of Morning Star flag is allowed in West Papua only if accompanied by, and not raised higher than, the flag of Indonesia.

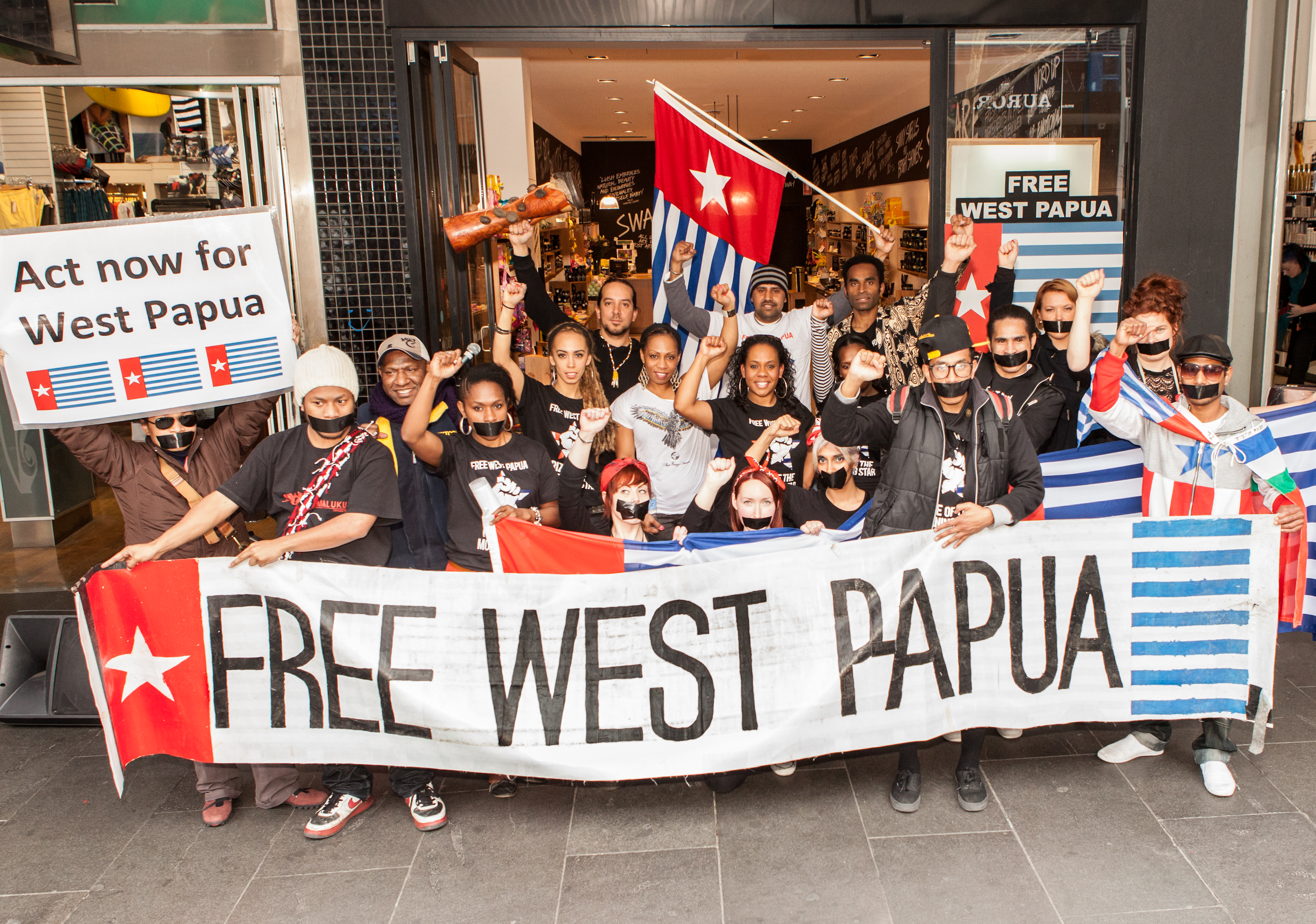
Free West Papua protest in Melbourne, Australia, August 2012.

In 2011, Indonesia submitted an application for membership to the Melanesian Spearhead Group (MSG) for the then two Papua provinces (as well as three other Melanesian majority provinces of Nusa Tenggara Timur, Maluku, and Maluku Utara) and was granted observer status. The West Papua National Council for Liberation independence movement made an unsuccessful application for membership to the MSG in 2013 after which the United Liberation Movement for West Papua (ULMWP) was established in December 2014 to unite the three main political independence movements under a single umbrella organisation. In June 2015, the ULMWP was granted MSG observer status as representative of West Papuans outside the country while Indonesia was upgraded to associate member.

In 2016, at the 71st Session of the UN General Assembly, leaders of several Pacific Island countries called for UN action on alleged human rights abuses committed against Papua's indigenous Melanesians, with some leaders calling for self-determination for West Papua. Indonesia accused the countries of interfering with Indonesia's national sovereignty. In 2017, at the 72nd Session, the leaders called again for an investigation into killings and various alleged human rights abuses by Indonesian security forces.

Following his election in 2014, Indonesian president, Joko Widodo, embarked on reforms intended to alleviate grievances of Native Papuans, such as stopping the transmigration program and starting massive infrastructure spending in Papua, including building Trans-Papua roads network. The Joko Widodo administration has prioritized infrastructure and human resource development as a great framework for solving the conflict in Papua. The administration has implemented a one-price fuel policy in Papua, with Jokowi assessing that it is a form of "justice" for all Papuans. The administration has also provided free primary and secondary education.

Security forces have been accused of abuses in the region including extrajudicial killings, torture, arrests of activists, and displacements of entire villages. On the other hand, separatists have been accused and claimed much of the same violence, such as extrajudicial killings of both Papuan and non-Papuan civilians, torture, rapes, and attacking local villages. Protests against Indonesian rule in Papua happen frequently, the most recent being the 2019 Papua protests, one of the largest and most violent, which include burning of mostly non-Papuan civilians and Papuans that did not want to join the rally.

The 2019 Papua protests began on 19 August 2019, and mainly took place across the region in response to the arrests of 43 Papuan students in Surabaya for allegedly disrespecting the Indonesian flag.

During the Megawati Sukarnoputri administration in 2001, aside from changing the province name from "Irian Jaya" to "Papua", Papua gained a "Special Autonomy" status, an attempted political compromise between Papuans and the central government that has weak support within the Jakarta government. However according to some observers, this "Special Autonomy" has never been fully implemented. After the passing of the new Papuan Special Autonomy Law in 2021, the region was divided into six provinces in 2022. Regardless, some Papuans refuse any promises of autonomy from Indonesia as they are instead demanding independence, and a free referendum for all Papuans to determine whether they choose independence or not.

== Geography ==
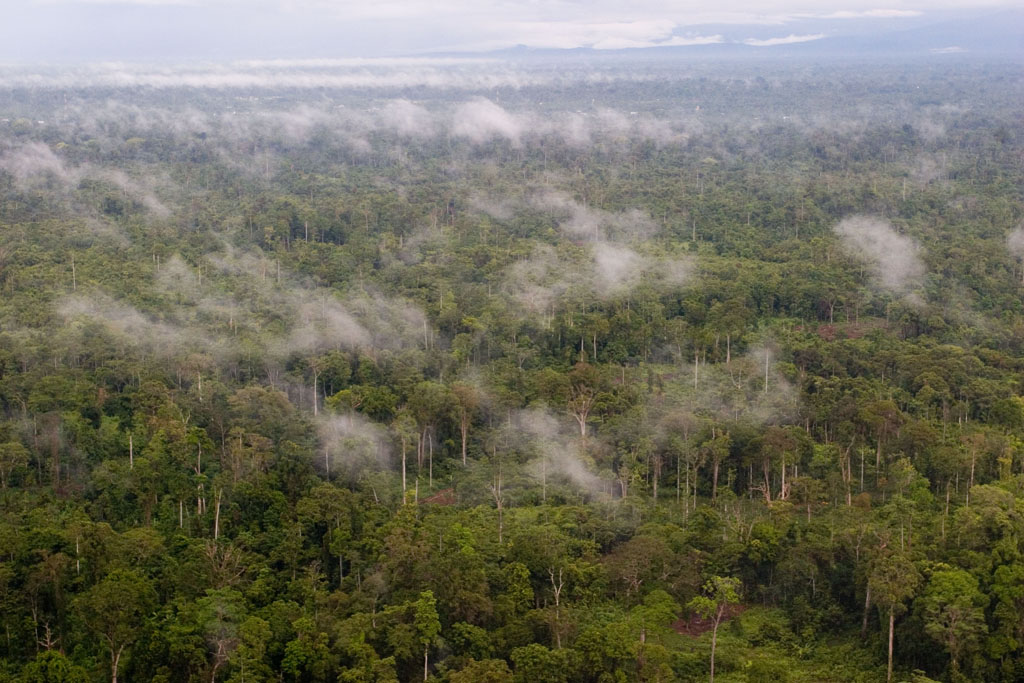
The lowland rainforest of the Western New Guinea

The region is 1,200 kilometres (750 miles) from east to west and 736 kilometres (457 miles) from north to south. It has an area of 412,214.61 square kilometres (159,157 square miles), which equates to approximately 22% of Indonesia's land area. The northern part of the border with Papua New Guinea follows the 141st meridian east until it reaches the Fly River.

The island of New Guinea lies to the east of the Malay Archipelago, with which it is sometimes included as part of a greater Indo-Australian Archipelago. Geologically it is a part of the same tectonic plate as Australia. When world sea levels were low, the two shared shorelines (which now lie 100 to 140 metres‌ below sea level), and combined with lands now inundated into the tectonic continent of Sahul, also known as Greater Australia. The two landmasses became separated when the area now known as the Torres Strait flooded after the end of the Last Glacial Period.

The island of New Guinea was once part of the Australian landmass and lay on the continent of Sahul. The collision between the Indo-Australian Plate and the Pacific Plate resulted in the formation of the Maoke Mountains, which run through the centre of the region and are 600 km (373 mi) long and 100 km (62 mi) across. The range includes about ten peaks over 4,000 metres (13,000 feet), including Puncak Jaya (4,884 m or 16,024 ft), Puncak Mandala (4,760 m or 15,620 ft) and Puncak Trikora (4,750 m or 15,580 ft). This range ensures a steady supply of rain from the tropical atmosphere. The tree line is around 4,000 m (13,100 ft) and the tallest peaks feature small glaciers and are snowbound year-round. Both north and west of the central ranges, the land remains mountainous – mostly 1,000 to 2,000 metres (3,300 to 6,600 feet) high with a warm humid climate year-round. The highland areas feature alpine grasslands, jagged bare peaks, montane forests, rainforests, fast-flowing rivers, and gorges. Swamps and low-lying alluvial plains with fertile soil dominate the southeastern section around the town of Merauke. Swamps also extend 300 kilometres (190 miles) around the Asmat region.

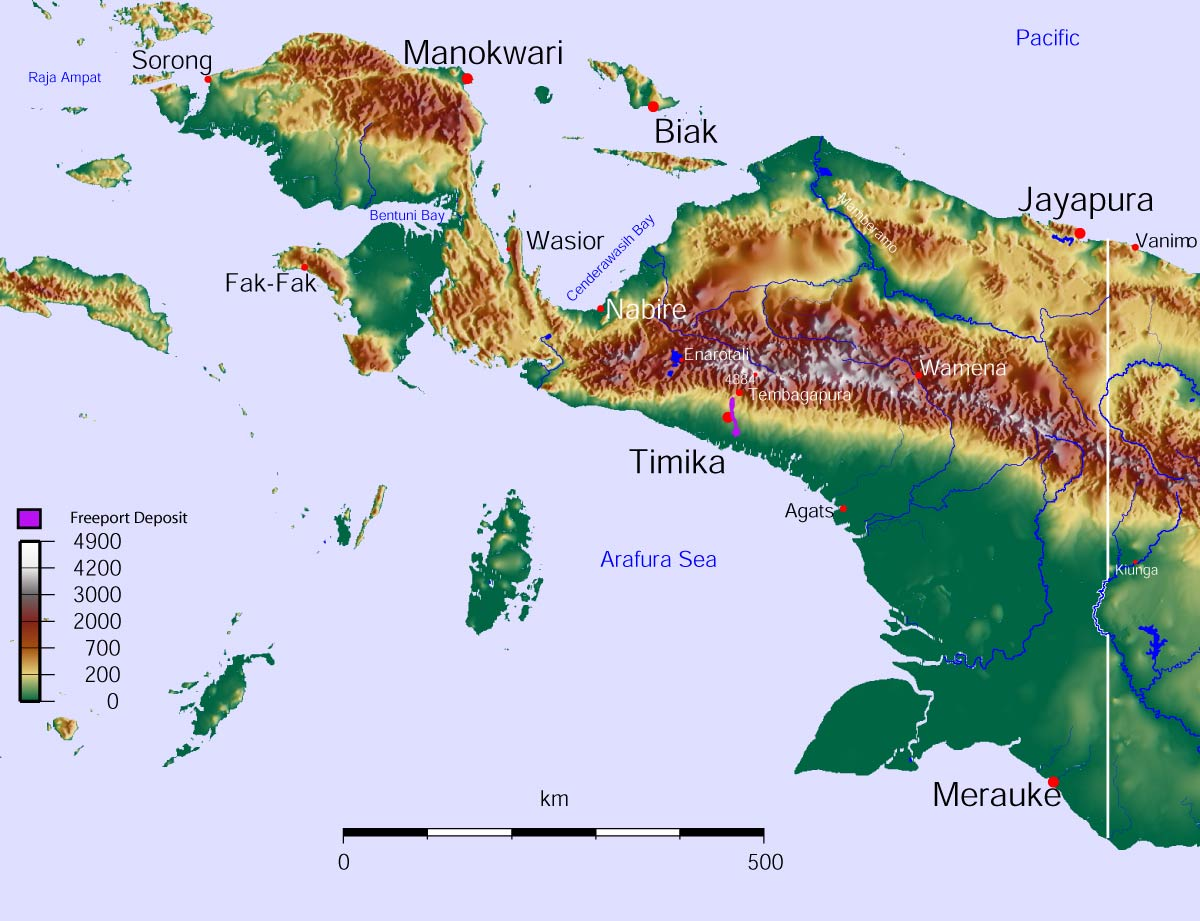
The rugged and mountainous topography of Western New Guinea.

The Mamberamo River is the region's largest and runs through the length of Papua. The result is a large area of lakes and rivers known as the Lakes Plains region. The southern lowlands, habitats of which included mangrove, tidal and freshwater swamp forest, and lowland rainforest, are home to populations of fishermen and gatherers such as the Asmat people.

Papua, like most parts of Indonesia, has two seasons, the dry season and the rainy season. From June to September the wind flows from Australia and does not contain much water vapour resulting in a dry season. On the other hand, from December to March, the wind currents contain a lot of water vapour originating from Asia and the Pacific Ocean so that the rainy season occurs. The average temperature in Papua ranges from 19 °C to 28 °C and humidity is between 80% and 89%. The average annual rainfall is between 1,500 mm and 7,500 mm. Snowfalls sometime occurs in the mountainous areas of New Guinea, especially the central highlands region.

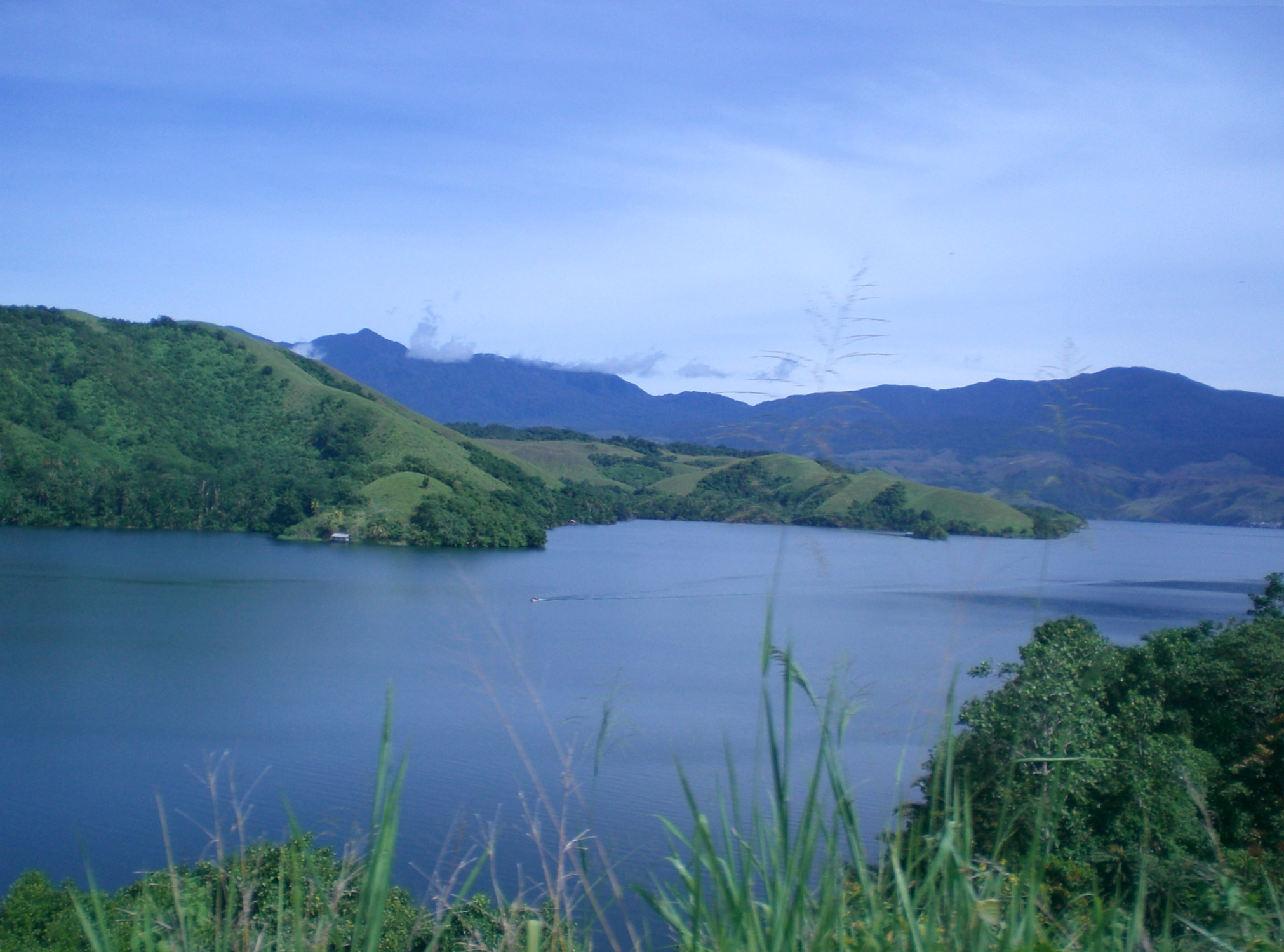
View of Lake Sentani near Jayapura

Various other smaller mountain ranges occur both north and west of the central ranges. Except in high elevations, most areas possess a hot, humid climate throughout the year, with some seasonal variation associated with the northeast monsoon season.

Another major habitat feature is the vast northern lowlands. Stretching for hundreds of kilometres‌, these include lowland rainforests, extensive wetlands, savanna grasslands, and some of the largest expanses of mangrove forest in the world. The northern lowlands are drained principally by the province's largest river, the Mamberamo River and its tributaries on the western side, and by the Sepik on the eastern side. The result is a large area of lakes and rivers known as the Lakes Plains region.

=== Ecology ===
Lying in the Asia-Australian transition zone near Wallacea, the region's flora and fauna include Asiatic, Australian, and endemic species. The region is 75% forest and has a high degree of biodiversity. The island has an estimated 16,000 species of plants, 124 genera of which are endemic. The mountainous areas and the north are covered with dense rainforest. Highland vegetation also includes alpine grasslands, heath, pine forests, bush and scrub. The vegetation of the south coast includes mangroves and sago palms and in the drier southeastern section, eucalypts, paperbarks, and acacias.

Marsupial species dominate the region; there are an estimated 70 marsupial species (including possums, wallabies, tree-kangaroos, and cuscus), and 180 other mammal species (including the endangered long-beaked echidna). The region is the only part of Indonesia to have kangaroos, marsupial mice, bandicoots, and ring-tailed possums. The approximately 700 bird species include cassowaries (along the southern coastal areas), bowerbirds, kingfishers, crowned pigeons, parrots, and cockatoos. Approximately 450 of these species are endemic. Birds-of-paradise can be found in Kepala Burung and Yapen. The region is also home to around 800 species of spiders, 200 frogs, 30,000 beetles, and 70 bats, as well as one of the world's longest lizards (the Papuan monitor) and some of the world's largest butterflies. The waterways and wetlands of Papua provide habitat for salt and freshwater crocodiles, tree monitors, flying foxes, ospreys, and other animals, while the equatorial glacier fields remain largely unexplored.

In February 2005, a team of scientists exploring the Foja Mountains discovered numerous new species of birds, butterflies, amphibians, and plants, including a species of rhododendron that may have the largest bloom of the genus.

Environmental issues include deforestation, the spread of the introduced crab-eating macaque, which now threatens the existence of native species, and discarded copper and gold tailings from the Grasberg mine.

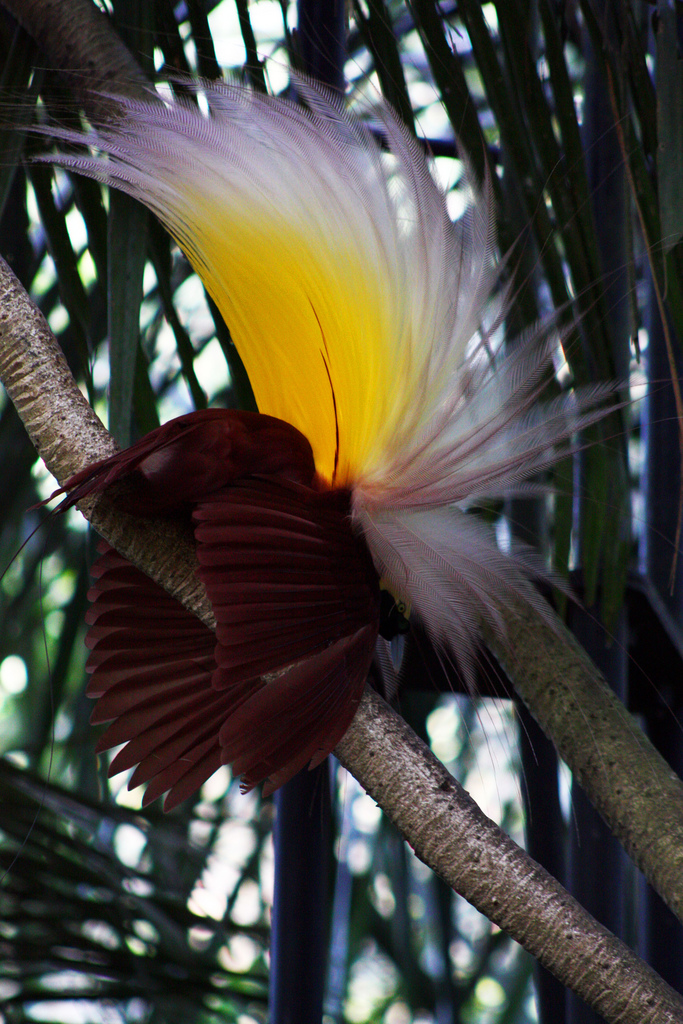
Paradisaea apoda, native to Papua, displaying its feathers

Anthropologically, New Guinea is considered part of Melanesia. Botanically, New Guinea is considered part of Malesia, a floristic region that extends from the Malay Peninsula across Indonesia to New Guinea and the East Melanesian Islands. The flora of New Guinea is a mixture of many tropical rainforest species with origins in Asia, together with typically Australasian flora. Typical Southern Hemisphere flora include the Conifers Podocarpus and the rainforest emergents Araucaria and Agathis, as well as Tree ferns and several species of Eucalyptus.

New Guinea is differentiated from its drier, flatter, and less fertile southern counterpart, Australia, by its much higher rainfall and its active volcanic geology. Yet the two land masses share a similar animal fauna, with marsupials, including wallabies and possums, and the egg-laying monotreme, the echidna. Other than bats and some two dozen indigenous rodent genera, there are no pre-human indigenous placental mammals. Pigs, several additional species of rats, and the ancestor of the New Guinea singing dog were introduced with human colonization.

The island has an estimated 16,000 species of plant, 124 genera of which are endemic. Papua's known forest fauna includes; marsupials (including possums, wallabies, tree-kangaroos, cuscuses); other mammals (including the endangered long-beaked echidna); bird species such as birds-of-paradise, cassowaries, parrots, and cockatoos; the world's longest lizards (Papua monitor); and the world's largest butterflies.

The waterways and wetlands of Papua are also home to salt and freshwater crocodile, tree monitors, flying foxes, osprey, bats and other animals; while the equatorial glacier fields remain largely unexplored.

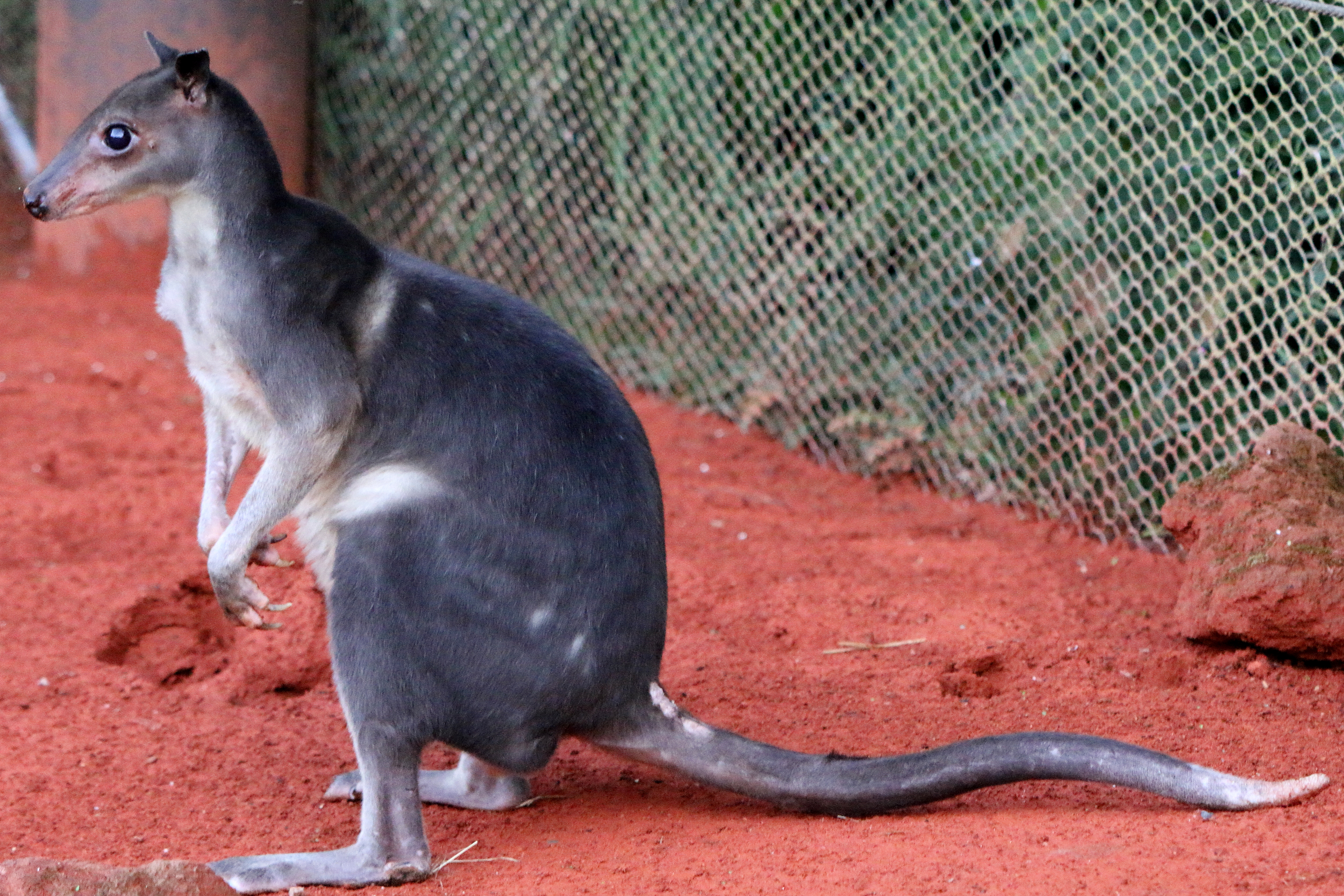
Dorcopsis hageni, native to northern region of New Guinea.

Protected areas within Papua include the World Heritage Lorentz National Park, and the Wasur National Park, a Ramsar wetland of international importance. Birdlife International has called Lorentz Park "probably the single most important reserve in New Guinea". It contains five of World Wildlife Fund's "Global 200" ecoregions: Southern New Guinea Lowland Forests; New Guinea Montane Forests; New Guinea Central Range Subalpine Grasslands; New Guinea mangroves; and New Guinea Rivers and Streams. Lorentz Park contains many unmapped and unexplored areas, and is certain to contain many species of plants and animals as yet unknown to Western science. Local communities' ethnobotanical and ethnozoological knowledge of the Lorentz biota is also very poorly documented. On the other hand, Wasur National Park has a very high value biodiversity has led to the park being dubbed the "Serengeti of Papua". About 70% of the total area of the park consists of savanna (see Trans-Fly savanna and grasslands), while the remaining vegetation is swamp forest, monsoon forest, coastal forest, bamboo forest, grassy plains and large stretches of sago swamp forest. The dominant plants include Mangroves, Terminalia, and Melaleuca species. The park provides habitat for a large variety of up to 358 bird species of which some 80 species are endemic to the island of New Guinea. Fish diversity is also high in the region with some 111 species found in the eco-region and a large number of these are recorded from Wasur. The park's wetland provides habitat for various species of lobster and crab as well.

Several parts of the region remain unexplored due to steep terrain, leaving a high possibility that there are still many undiscovered floras and faunas that is yet to be discovered. In February 2006, a team of scientists exploring the Foja Mountains, Sarmi, discovered new species of birds, butterflies, amphibians, and plants, including possibly the largest-flowered species of rhododendron. In December 2007, a second scientific expedition was taken to the mountain range. The expedition led to the discovery of two new species: the first being a 1.4 kg giant rat (Mallomys sp.) approximately five times the size of a regular brown rat, the second a pygmy possum (Cercartetus sp.) described by scientists as "one of the world's smallest marsupials." An expedition late in 2008, backed by the Indonesian Institute of Sciences, National Geographic Society and Smithsonian Institution, was made in order to assess the area's biodiversity. New types of animals recorded include a frog with a long erectile nose, a large woolly rat, an imperial-pigeon with rust, grey and white plumage, a 25 cm gecko with claws rather than pads on its toes, and a small, 30 cm high, black forest wallaby (a member of the genus Dorcopsis).

Ecological threats include logging-induced deforestation, forest conversion for plantation agriculture (including oil palm), smallholder agricultural conversion, the introduction and potential spread of alien species such as the crab-eating macaque which preys on and competes with indigenous species, the illegal species trade, and water pollution from oil and mining operations.

=== Flora and fauna on the Bird's Head Peninsula ===
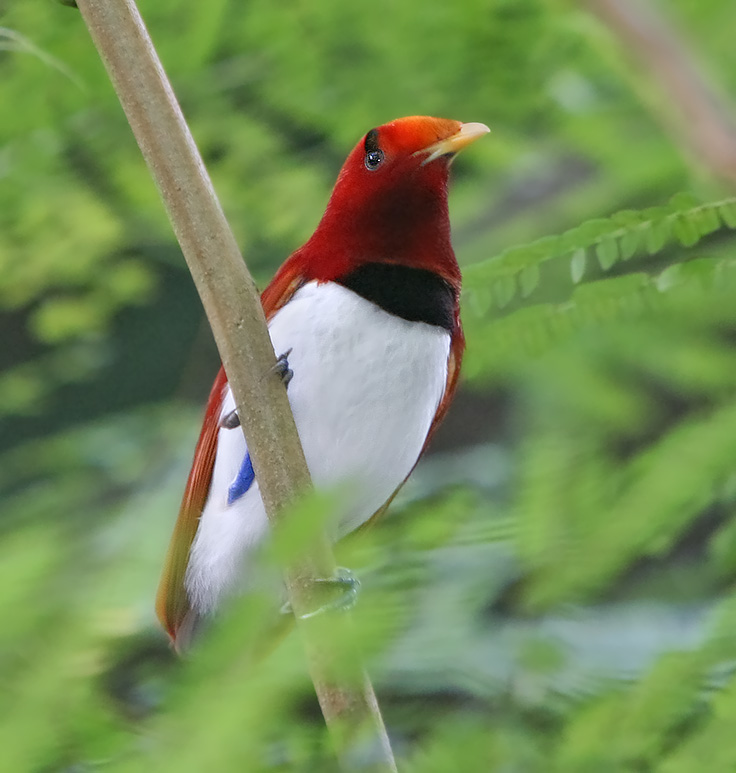
The king bird-of-paradise is one of over 300 bird species on the peninsula.

The Bird's Head Peninsula, also known as the Doberai Peninsula, is covered by the Vogelkop montanerainforests ecoregion. It includes more than 22,000 km^{2} of montane forests at elevations of 1,000 m (3,300 ft) and higher. Over 50% of these forests are located within protected areas. There are over 300 bird species on the peninsula, of which at least 20 are unique to the ecoregion, and some live only in very restricted areas. These include the grey-banded munia, Vogelkop bowerbird, and the king bird-of-paradise.

Road construction, illegal logging, commercial agricultural expansion, and ranching potentially threaten the integrity of the ecoregion. The southeastern coast of the Bird's Head Peninsula forms part of the Teluk Cenderawasih National Park.

== Government and politics ==
From 1962 to 1973 the region was governed as a single province of Irian Barat (West Irian), renamed Irian Jaya (literally "Glorious Irian") in 1973 and Papua in 2002, with its capital in Jayapura. In the post-Suharto era, the national government began a process of decentralisation of the provinces, including, in December 2001, a special autonomy status for Irian Jaya province and a reinvestment into the region of 80% of the taxation receipts generated by the region, in addition of special autonomy fund.

In 2003, a new province of West Papua was created with its administrative capital as Manokwari, comprising lands in the Bird's Head Peninsula and surrounding islands to its west, with the rest of Western New Guinea remaining in the truncated Papua. Both provinces were granted special autonomous status by Indonesian legislation. President Megawati Sukarnoputri had attempted to create a third province called Central Irian Jaya (Irian Jaya Tengah); a government for it was delayed from August 2003 due to violent local protests. The creation of this separate province was blocked by Indonesian courts, who declared it to be unconstitutional and in contravention of the Papua's special autonomy agreement. The previous division into two provinces was allowed to stand as an established fact.

In November 2022, three additional provinces were created from parts of Papua Province – Central Papua, Highland Papua, and South Papua – while another additional province, Southwest Papua, was created from the northwestern part of West Papua Province; these received the same special autonomous status as the residual West Papua and Papua Provinces, the latter now consisting only of northern Papua and the groups of islands in Cenderawasih Bay.

=== Current government ===
Central Papua Highland Papua Papua South Papua Southwest Papua West Papua

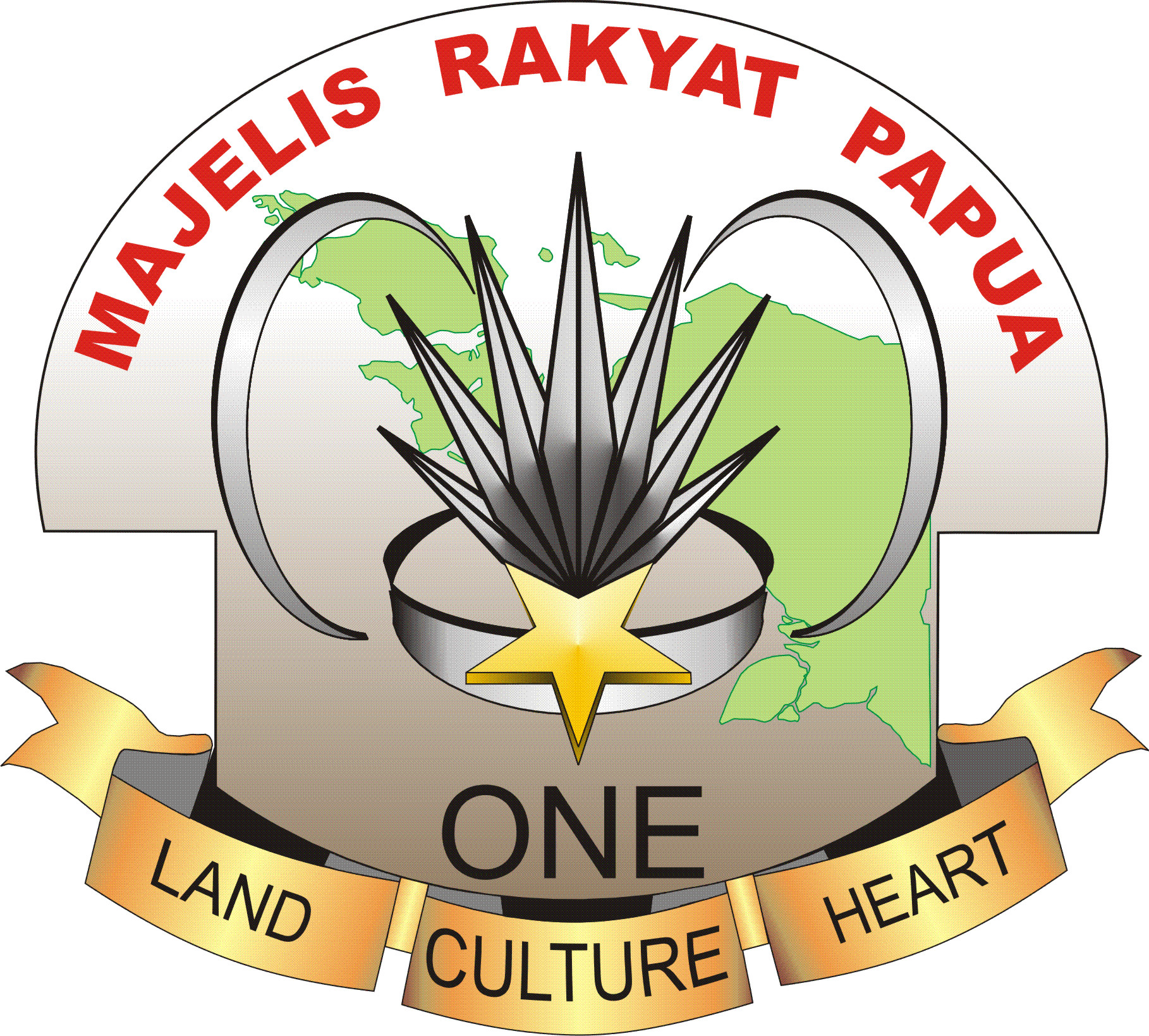
Logo of Papuan People's Assembly, a special organization in Papua Province composed of native Papuans to enforce the special autonomy.

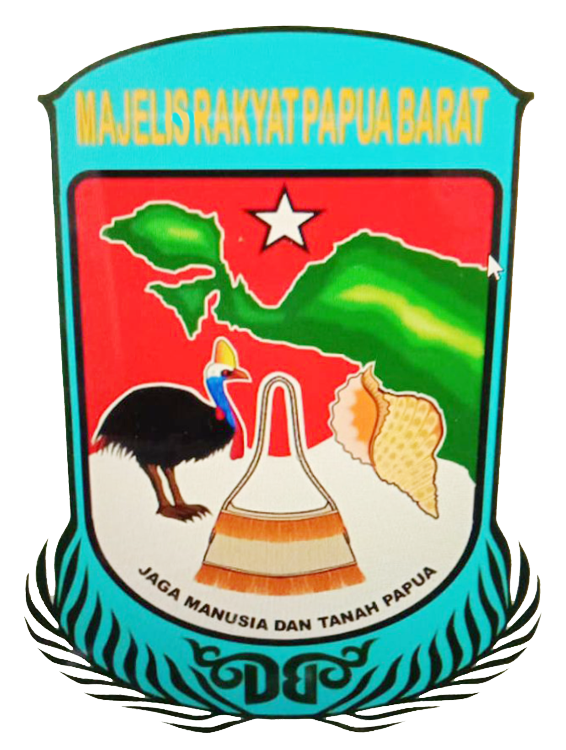
Logo of West Papuan People's Assembly, a special organization in West Papua Province composed of native West Papuans to enforce the special autonomy.

Western New Guinea is currently administered as six Indonesian provinces:

Province	Capital	Area in km^{2}	Population (2023)	Regency (kabupaten)	City (kota)	Customary Territory
Central Papua	Nabire	61,072.92	1,357,071	Deiyai; Dogiyai; Intan Jaya; Mimika; Nabire; Paniai; Puncak; Puncak Jaya	–	Mee Pago and parts of Saireri (Note: Mostly in the region Mee Pago but Nabire Regency is a part of Saireri.)
Highland Papua	Jayawijaya	51,213.34	1,464,466	Central Mamberamo; Jayawijaya; Lanny Jaya; Nduga; Pegunungan Bintang; Tolikara; Yahukimo; Yalimo	–	La Pago (Note: shortened from Lano Pago)
Papua	Jayapura	82,680.95	1,085,281	Biak Numfor; Jayapura; Keerom; Mamberamo Raya; Sarmi; Supiori; Waropen; Yapen Islands	Jayapura	Tabi (Mamta) (Note: shortened from Mamberamo-Tabi) and rest of Saireri
South Papua	Merauke	117,849.16	533,910	Asmat; Boven Digoel; Mappi; Merauke	–	Anim Ha
Southwest Papua	Sorong	39,122.93	613,180	Maybrat; Raja Ampat; Sorong; South Sorong; Tambrauw	Sorong	Half of Doberai
West Papua	Manokwari	60,275.33	565,805	Arfak Mountains; Fakfak; Kaimana; Manokwari; South Manokwari; Teluk Bintuni; Teluk Wondama	–	Rest of Doberai and Bomberai
-	-	412,214.63	5,619,713	-	-	Western New Guinea

== Demographics ==
Historical population
Year	Pop.	±%
1971	923,440	—
1980	1,173,875	+27.1%
1990	1,648,708	+40.5%
1995	1,942,627	+17.8%
2000	2,220,934	+14.3%
2010	3,593,803	+61.8%
2020	5,437,775	+51.3%
2021	5,512,275	+1.4%
2022	5,601,888	+1.6%

The population of the region was estimated to be 5,601,888 in mid 2022. The interior is predominantly populated by ethnic Papuans while coastal towns are inhabited by descendants of intermarriages between Papuans, Melanesians, and Austronesians, including other Indonesian ethnic groups. Migrants from the rest of Indonesia also tend to inhabit the coastal regions. The largest cities in the territory are Jayapura in the region's northeast, and Sorong in the northwest of the Bird's Head Peninsula. By 2022 Jayapura had a population of over 400,000 and Sorong nearly 300,000; other major towns are Timika and Nabire in Central Papua, Merauke in South Papua, and Manokwari in the northeast of the Bird's Head Peninsula, each of which had over 100,000 inhabitants in 2022.

The region is home to around 312 different tribes, including some uncontacted peoples. The Lani from the Toli valley and surrounding regions, combined with Dani (or Hubula) from the Baliem Valley, are one of the most populous tribes of the region. The Arfak in Arfak Mountains, and the Marind from Merauke. The semi-nomadic Asmat inhabit the mangrove and tidal river areas near Agats and are renowned for their woodcarving. Other tribes include the Amung-Damal, Bauzi, Biak (or Byak), Korowai, Mee, Mek, Sawi, and Yali. Estimates of the number of distinct languages spoken in the region range from 200 to 700. A number of these languages are permanently disappearing.

As in Papua New Guinea and some surrounding east Indonesian provinces, a large majority of the population is Christian. In the 2010 census, 65.48% identified themselves as Protestant, 17.67% as Catholic, 15.89% as Muslim, and less than 1% as either Hindu or Buddhist. There is also a substantial practice of animism among the major religions, but this is not recorded by the census.

Papua is also home to many migrants from other parts of Indonesia, of which an overwhelming percentage of these migrants came as part of a government-sponsored transmigration program. The transmigration program in Papua was formally halted by President Joko Widodo in June 2015 but restarted by President Prabowo in 2024.

=== Ethnicity ===
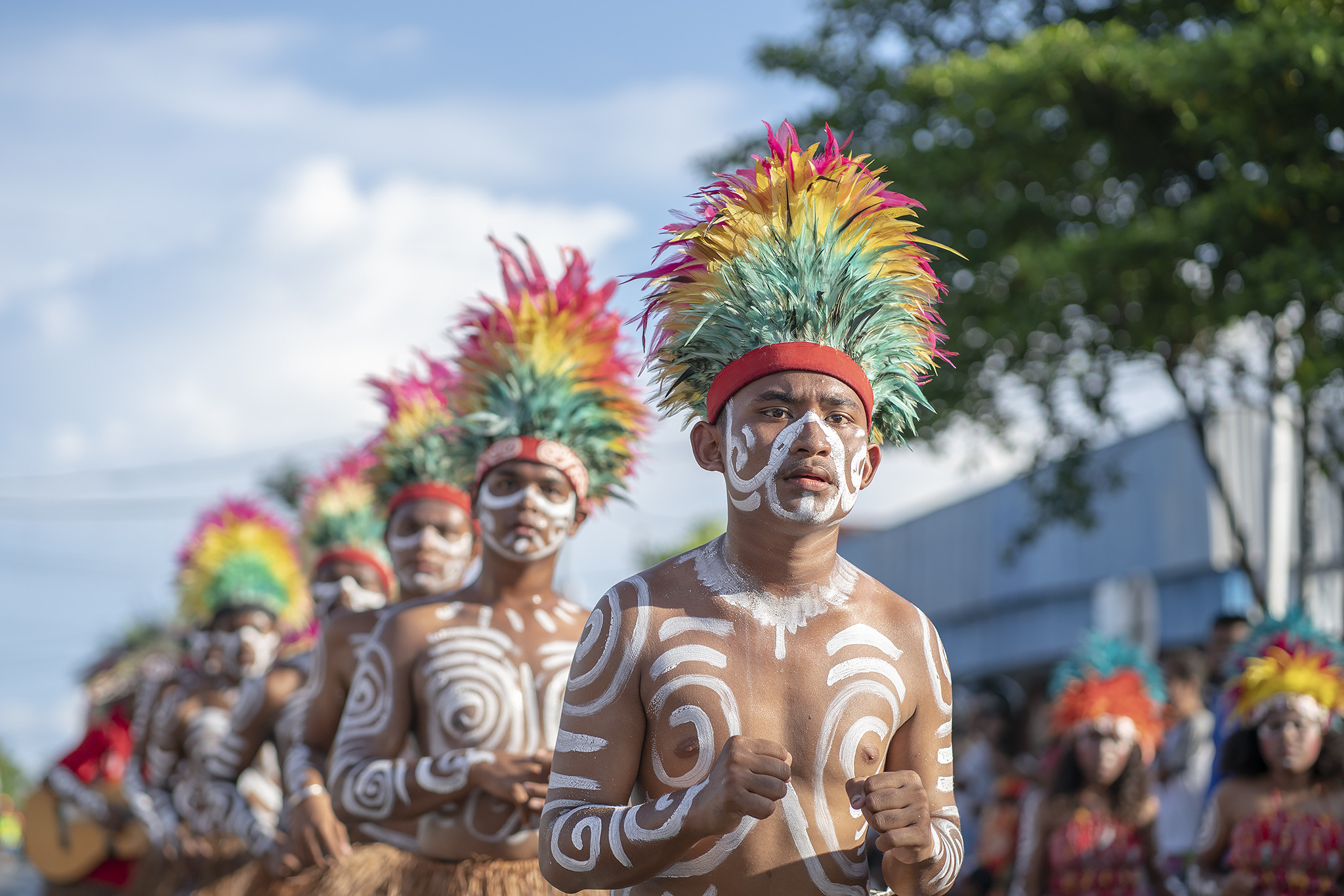
Culture parade in Biak

In contrast to the rest of Indonesia, which are mostly dominated by Austronesian peoples, Papua as well as some parts of Maluku are home to Melanesians. The indigenous Papuans (who are Melanesian) form the majority of the population in the region. Many believe human habitation on the island dates to as early as 50,000 BC, and it has been proposed that first settlement possibly dates back to 60,000 years ago. The island of New Guinea is presently populated by almost a thousand different tribal groups and a near-equivalent number of separate languages, which makes it the most linguistically diverse area in the world. Current evidence indicates that the Papuans (who constitute the majority of the island's peoples) are descended from the earliest human inhabitants of New Guinea. These original inhabitants first arrived in New Guinea at a time (either side of the Last Glacial Maximum, approx 21,000 years ago) when the island was connected to the Australian continent via a land bridge, forming the landmass of Sahul. These peoples had made the (shortened) sea-crossing from the islands of Wallacea and Sundaland (the present Malay Archipelago) by at least 40,000 years ago.

The ancestral Austronesian peoples are believed to have arrived considerably later, approximately 3,500 years ago, as part of a gradual seafaring migration from Southeast Asia, possibly originating in Taiwan. Austronesian-speaking peoples colonized many of the offshore islands to the north and east of New Guinea, such as New Ireland and New Britain, with settlements also on the coastal fringes of the main island in places. Human habitation of New Guinea over tens of thousands of years has led to a great deal of diversity, which was further increased by the later arrival of the Austronesians and the more recent history of European and Asian settlement.

Papuan is also home to ethnic groups from other parts of Indonesia, including the Javanese, Sundanese, Balinese, Batak, etc. Most of these migrants initially came as part of the transmigration program, which was an initiative of the Dutch colonial government and later continued by the Indonesian government to move landless people from densely populated areas of Indonesia to less populous areas of the country. The program was accused of fuelling marginalisation and discrimination of Papuans by migrants, and causing fears of the "Javanisation" or "Islamisation" of Papua. There is open conflict between migrants, the state, and indigenous groups due to differences in culture—particularly in administration, and cultural topics such as nudity, food and sex. The transmigration program in Papua was reportedly stopped in 2015 due to the controversies it had caused, however, the official transmigration program was markedly reduced in 1998 and practically halted by Wahid's administration in the 2000s. Instead, most migrants were due to spontaneous migrations from other parts of Indonesia attracted by economic opportunities. They are often stereotyped in foreign interpretations to be Javanese Muslims, though as shown in the 2010 Indonesian census, they are primarily Moluccans, Sulawesians (Bugis, Makassarese, Toraja, Minahasans), Bataks, and Timorese, many of whom are Christians from Eastern Indonesia and worship in local churches.

=== Language ===
Trans-New Guinea languages (multi-coloured), Austronesian languages (gold), and other languages (grey)

Papua, the easternmost region of the Indonesian archipelago, exhibits a very complex linguistic network. The diversity of languages and the situation of multilingualism is very real. There are many language families scattered in this wide area, namely the Austronesian language family and numerous non-Austronesian languages known collectively as Papuan languages. Speakers of different Austronesian languages are found in coastal communities, such as Biak, Wandamen, Waropen and Ma'ya. On the other hand, Papuan languages are spoken in the interior and Central Highlands, starting from the Bird's Head Peninsula in the west to the eastern tip of the island of New Guinea, for example Meybrat, Dani, Ekari, Asmat, Muyu and Sentani language.

At this time, research efforts to find out how many indigenous languages in Papua are still being pursued. Important efforts regarding documentation and inventory of languages in Papua have also been carried out by two main agencies, namely SIL International and the Language and Book Development Agency in Jakarta. The results of the research that have been published by the two institutions show that there are differences in the number of regional languages in Papua. The Language and Book Development Agency as the official Indonesian government agency has announced or published that there are 207 different regional languages in Papua, while SIL International has stated that there are 271 regional languages in the region. Some of the regional languages of Papua are spoken by a large number of speakers and a wide spread area, some are supported by a small number of speakers and are scattered in a limited environment. However, until now it is estimated that there are still a number of regional languages in Papua that have not been properly studied so that it is not known what the form of the language is. In addition to local languages that have been listed by the two main institutions above, there are also dozens more languages from other islands due to population migration that is not included in the list of local languages in Papua, for example languages from Sulawesi (Bugis, Makassar, Toraja, Minahasa), Javanese from Java, and local languages from Maluku. So-called Papuan languages comprise hundreds of different languages, most of which are not related.

As in the rest of Indonesia, Indonesian is the official language of the state and provincial government. Indonesian is used in inter-ethnic communication, usually between native Papuans and non-Papuan migrants who came from other parts of Indonesia. Most formal education, and nearly all national mass media, governance, administration, judiciary, and other forms of communication in Papua, are conducted in Indonesian. A Malay-based creole language called Papuan Malay is used as the lingua franca in the region. It emerged as a contact language among tribes in Indonesian New Guinea for trading and daily communication. Nowadays, it has a growing number of native speakers. More recently, the vernacular of Indonesian Papuans has been influenced by Standard Indonesian, the national standard dialect. Some linguists have suggested that Papuan Malay has its roots in North Moluccan Malay, as evidenced by the number of Ternate loanwords in its lexicon. Others have proposed that it is derived from Ambonese Malay. A large number of local languages are spoken in the region, and the need for a common lingua franca has been underlined by the centuries-old traditions of inter-group interaction in the form of slave-hunting, adoption, and intermarriage. It is likely that Malay was first introduced by the Biak people, who had contacts with the Sultanate of Tidore, and later, in the 19th century, by traders from China and South Sulawesi. However, Malay was probably not widespread until the adoption of the language by the Dutch missionaries who arrived in the early 20th century and were then followed in this practice by the Dutch administrators. The spread of Malay into the more distant areas was further facilitated by the Opleiding tot Dorpsonderwizer ('Education for village teacher') program during the Dutch colonial era. There are four varieties of Papuan Malay that can be identified, including Serui Malay. A variety of Papuan Malay is spoken in Vanimo, Papua New Guinea near the Indonesian border.

=== Religion ===
Religion in Western New Guinea (2022)
1. Protestantism (66.1%)
2. Islam (19.7%)
3. Roman Catholicism (14.0%)
4. Hinduism (0.08%)
5. Buddhism (0.06%)
6. Confucianism (0.00%)
7. Others (0.05%)

Christianity, including Protestantism and Roman Catholic are mostly adhered by native Papuans and migrants from Maluku, East Nusa Tenggara, North Sulawesi and Bataks of North Sumatra. Islam are mostly adhered by migrants from North Maluku, South Sulawesi (except Torajans), western Indonesia, and some native Papuans. Lastly Hinduism and Buddhism are mostly adhered by Balinese migrants and Chinese-Indonesians respectively. There is also substantial practice of animism, the traditional religion for many Papuans, with many blending animistic beliefs with other religions such as Christianity and Islam.

Islam has been present in Papua since the 15th century, because of interaction with Muslim traders and Moluccan Muslim Sultanates especially the earliest being Bacan. Though there were many earlier theories and folk legends on origin of Islam, sometimes mixed with indigenous folk religion of Fakfak, Kaimana, Bintuni, and Wondama. These include Islamic procession of Hajj pilgrimage that do not go to Meccah, but to Nabi Mountain, near Arguni Bay and Wondama Bay. According to Aceh origins, a Samudra Pasai figure called Tuan Syekh Iskandar Syah was sent to Mesia (Kokas) to preach in Nuu War (Papua), he converted a Papuan called Kriskris by teaching him about Alif Lam Ha (Allah) and Mim Ha Mim Dal (Muhammad), he became Imam and first king of Patipi, Fakfak. Syekh Iskandar brought with him some religious texts, which were copied onto Koba-Koba leaves and wood barks. Syekh Iskandar would return to Aceh bringing the original manuscripts, but before that he would visit Moluccas specifically in Sinisore village. This corresponds with the village's origin of Islam that instead came from Papua. A study by Fakfak government, mentioned another Acehnese figure called Abdul Ghafar who visited Old Fatagar in 1502 under the reign of Rumbati King Mansmamor. He would preach in Onin language (lingua franca of the area at the time) and was buried next to village mosque in Rumbati, Patipi Bay, Fakfak. Based on family account of Abdullah Arfan, the dynasty of Salawati Kingdom, in the 16th century the first Papuan Muslim was Kalewan who married Siti Hawa Farouk, a muballighah from Cirebon, and changed his name to Bayajid who became the ancestor of Arfan clan. Meanwhile, based on oral history of Fakfak and Kaimana, a Sufi by the name of Syarif Muaz al-Qathan from Yaman constructed a mosque in Tunasgain, which was dated using the 8 merbau woods previously used as ceremonial Alif poles for the mosque around every 50 years, to be from 1587. He was also attributed of converting Samay, an Adi Ruler of the royal line of Sran. Islam only grew in the coastal part of Papua especially in the bird head areas, and did not spread to the interior part of the island until Dutch started sending migrants in 1902 and exiled Indonesian leaders in 1910 to Merauke. Muhammadiyah figures were exiled in Papua and in their exile help spread Islam in the region. Later on to help members with education issues, Muhammadiyah only formally sent its teacher in 1933. Islam in the interior highland only spread after 1962, after interaction with teachers and migrants as was the case of Jayawijaya and the case of Dani tribe of Megapura. While in Wamena, conversion of Walesi village in 1977 was attributed to Jamaludin Iribaram, a Papuan teacher from Fakfak. Other smaller indigenous Islamic communities can also be found in Asmat, Yapen, Waropen, Biak, Jayapura, and Manowari.

Missionaries Carl Ottow and Johann Geisler, under the initiative of Ottho Gerhard Heldring and permission from Tidore Sultanate, are the first Christian missionaries that reached Papua. They entered Papua at Mansinam Island, near Manokwari on 5 February 1855. Since 2001, the fifth of February has been a Papuan public holiday, recognizing this first landing. In 1863, sponsored by the Dutch colonial government, the Utrecht Mission Society (UZV) started a Christian-based education system as well as regular church services in Western New Guinea. Initially the Papuans' attendance was encouraged using bribes of betel nut and tobacco, but subsequently this was stopped. In addition, slaves were bought to be raised as step children and then freed. By 1880, only 20 Papuans had been baptized, including many freed slaves. The Dutch government established posts in Netherlands New Guinea in 1898, a move welcomed by the missionaries, who saw orderly Dutch rule as the essential antidote to Papua paganism. Subsequently, the UZV mission had more success, with a mass conversion near Cenderawasih Bay in 1907 and the evangelization of the Sentani people by Pamai, a native Papuan in the late 1920s. Due to the Great Depression, the mission suffered a funding shortfall, and switched to native evangelists, who had the advantage of speaking the local language (rather than Malay), but were often poorly trained. The mission extended in the 1930s to Yos Sudarso Bay, and the UZV mission by 1934 had over 50,000 Christians, 90% of them in North Papua, the remainder in West Papua. By 1942 the mission had expanded to 300 schools in 300 congregations. The first Catholic presence in Papua was in Fakfak, a Jesuit mission in 1894. In 1902 the Vicariate of Netherlands New Guinea was established. Despite the earlier activity in Fakfak, the Dutch restricted the Catholic Church to the southern part of the island, where they were active especially around Merauke. The mission campaigned against promiscuity and the destructive practices of headhunting among the Marind-anim. Following the 1918 flu pandemic, which killed one in five in the area, the Dutch government agreed to the establishment of model villages, based on European conditions, including wearing European clothes, but which the people would submit to only by violence. In 1925 the Catholics sought to re-establish their mission in Fakfak; permission was granted in 1927. This brought the Catholics into conflict with the Protestants in North Papua, who suggested expanding to South Papua in retaliation.

=== Haplogroups ===
There are 6 main Y-chromosome haplogroups in Western New Guinea; Y-chromosome haplogroup M, Y-chromosome haplogroup O, and Y-chromosome haplogroup S across the mountain highlands; meanwhile, D, C2 and C4 are of negligible numbers.

- Haplogroup M is the most frequently occurring Y-chromosome haplogroup in Western New Guinea.
- In a 2005 study of Papua New Guinea's ASPM gene variants, Mekel-Bobrov et al. found that the Papuan people have among the highest rate of the newly evolved ASPM haplogroup D, at 59.4% occurrence of the approximately 6,000-year-old allele.
- Haplogroup O is a primary descendant of haplogroup NO-M214 typical throughout the regions of East Asia, Southeast Asia, and Central Asia.
- Haplogroup S occurs in eastern Indonesia (10–20%) and Island Melanesia (≈10%), but reaches greatest frequency in the highlands of Papua New Guinea (52%).

== Economy ==
Papua GDP share by sector (2005)
1. Mining (71.6%)
2. Agriculture (10.4%)
3. Retails (4.00%)
4. Construction (3.50%)
5. Transport & communications (3.40%)
6. Others (7.10%)

Papua is reported to be one of Indonesia's poorest regions. It is rich in natural resources but has weaknesses namely in limited infrastructure and less skilled human resources. So far, Papua has had a fairly good economic development due to the support of economic sources, especially mining, forest, agriculture and fisheries products. Economic development has been uneven in Papua, and poverty in the region remains high by Indonesian standards. Part of the problem has been neglect of the poor—too little or the wrong kind of government support from Jakarta and Jayapura. A major factor in this is the extraordinarily high cost of delivering goods and services to large numbers of isolated communities, in the absence of a developed road or river network (the latter in contrast to Kalimantan) providing access to the interior and the highlands. Intermittent political and military conflict and tight security controls have also contributed to the problem but with the exception of some border regions and a few pockets in the highlands, this has not been the main factor contributing to underdevelopment.

Papua's gross domestic product grew at a faster rate than the national average until, and throughout the 1997 Asian financial crisis. However, the differences are much smaller if mining is excluded from the provincial GDP. Given that most mining revenues were commandeered by the central government until the Special Autonomy Law was passed in 2001, provincial GDP without mining is most likely a better measure of Papuan GDP during the pre- and immediate post-crisis periods. On a per capita basis, the GDP growth rates for both Papua and Indonesia are lower than those for total GDP. However, the gap between per capita GDP and total GDP is larger for Papua than for Indonesia as a whole, reflecting Papua's high population growth rates.

Although Papua has experienced almost no growth in GDP, the situation is not as serious as one might think. It is true that the mining sector, dominated by Freeport Indonesia, has been declining over the last decade or so, leading to a fall in the value of exports. On the other hand, government spending and fixed capital investment have both grown, by well over 10 per cent per year, contributing to growth in sectors such as finance, construction, transport and communications, and trade, hotels and restaurants. With so many sectors still experiencing respectable levels of growth, the impact of the stagnant economy on the welfare of the population will probably be limited. It should also be remembered that mining is typically an enclave activity; its impact on the general public is fairly limited, regardless of whether it is booming or contracting.

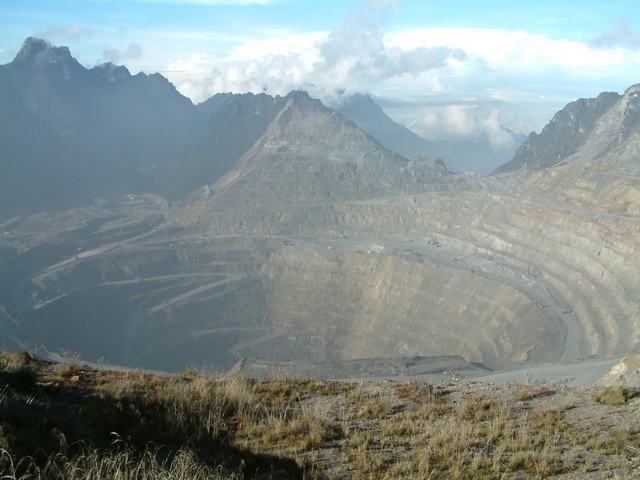
Grasberg Mine in Mimika Regency. Mining is the most important sector in the province

Papua has depended heavily on natural resources, especially the mining, oil and gas sectors, since the mid-1970s. Although this is still the case, there have been some structural changes in the two provincial economies since the split in 2003. The contribution of mining to the economy of Papua province declined from 62 per cent in 2003 to 47 per cent in 2012. The shares of agriculture and manufacturing also fell, but that of utilities remained the same. A few other sectors, notably construction and services, increased their shares during the period. Despite these structural changes, the economy of Papua province continues to be dominated by the mining sector, and in particular by a single company, Freeport indonesia.

Mining is still and remains one of the dominant economic sector in Papua. The Grasberg Mine, the world's largest gold mine and second-largest copper mine, is located in the highlands near Puncak Jaya, the highest mountain in Papua and whole Indonesia. Grasberg Mine producing 1.063 billion pounds of copper, 1.061 million ounces gold and 2.9 million ounces silver. It has 19,500 employees operated by PT Freeport Indonesia (PT-FI) which used to be 90.64% owned by Freeport-McMoran (FCX). In August 2017, FCX announced that it will divest its ownership in PT-FI so that Indonesia owns 51%. In return the CoW will be replaced by a special license (IUPK) with mining rights to 2041 and FCX will build a new smelter by 2022.

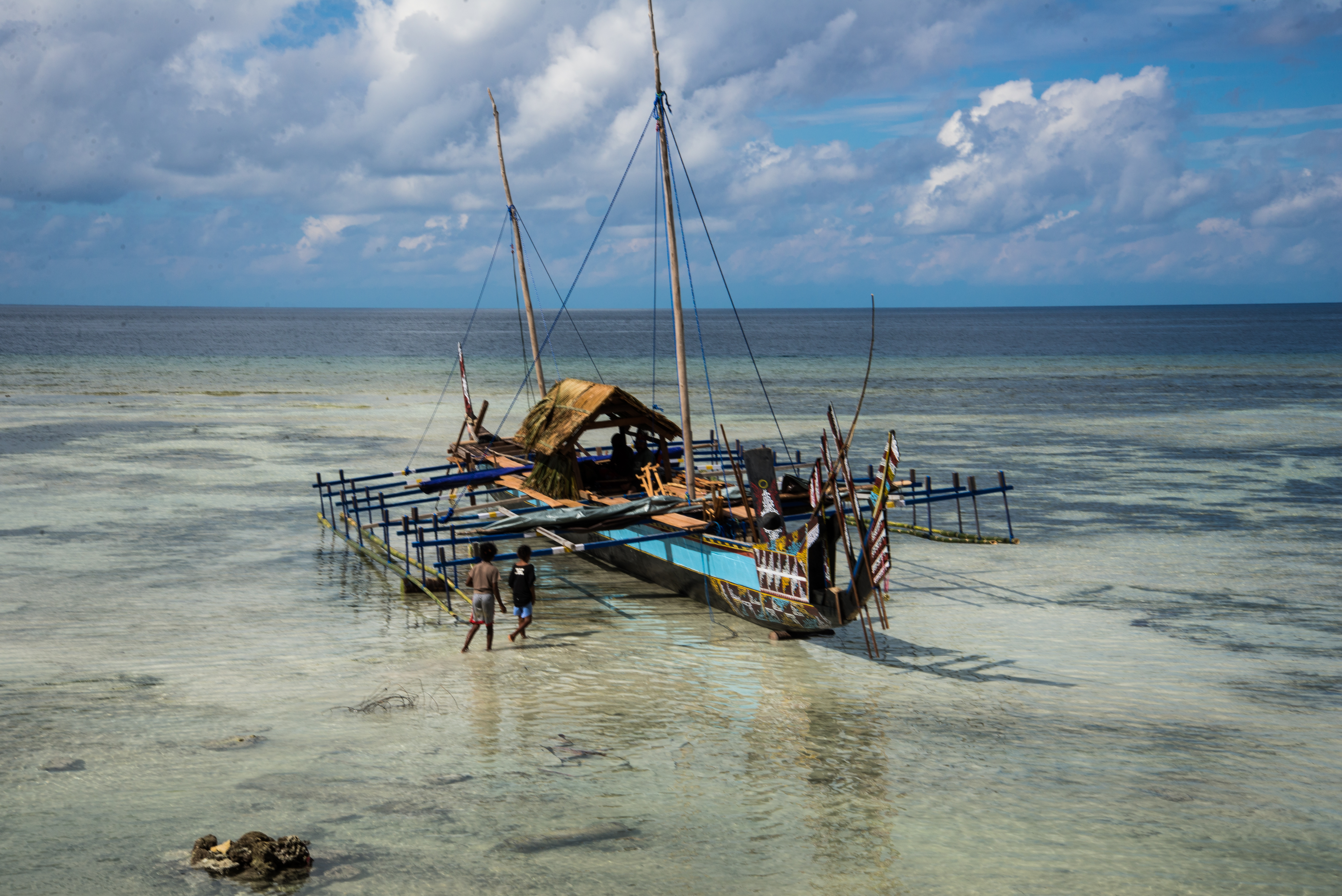
Fishing boats in Biak

Besides mining, there are at least three other important economic sectors (excluding the government sector) in the Papuan economy. The first is agriculture, particularly food crops, forestry and fisheries. Agriculture made up 10.4 per cent of provincial GDP in 2005 but grew at an average rate of only 0.1 per cent per annum in 2000–05. The second important sector is trade, hotels and restaurants, which contributed 4.0 per cent of provincial GDP in 2005. Within this sector, trade contributed most to provincial GDP. However, the subsector with the highest growth rate was hotels, which grew at 13.2 per cent per annum in 2000–05. The third important sector is transport and Communications, which contributed 3.4 per cent of provincial GDP in 2005. The sector grew at an average annual rate of 5.3 percent in 2000–05, slightly below the national level. Within the sector, sea transport, air transport and communications performed particularly well. The role of private enterprise in developing communications and air transport has become increasingly significant. Since private enterprise will only expand if businesspeople see good prospects to make a profit, this is certainly an encouraging development. At current rates of growth, the transport and communications sector could support the development of agriculture in Papua. However, so far, most of the growth in communications has been between the rapidly expanding urban areas of Jayapura, Timika and Merauke (the latter two now in the new provinces of Central Papua and South Papua respectively), and between them and the rest of Indonesia. Nevertheless, in the medium term, improved communication networks may create opportunities for Papua to shift from heavy dependence on the mining sector to greater reliance on the agricultural sector. With good international demand for palm oil anticipated in the medium term, production of this commodity could be expanded. However, the negative effects of deforestation on the local environment should be a major consideration in the selection of new areas for this and any other plantation crop. In 2011, Papuan caretaker governor Syamsul Arief Rivai claimed Papua's forests cover 42 million hectares with an estimated worth of Rp 700 trillion ($78 billion) and that if the forests were managed properly and sustainably, they could produce over 500 million cubic metres‌ of logs per annum.

Manufacturing and banking make up a tiny proportion of the regional economy and experienced negative growth in 2000–05. Poor infrastructure and lack of human capital are the most likely reasons for the poor performance of manufacturing. In addition, the costs of manufacturing are typically very high in Papua, as they are in many other outer island regions of Indonesia. Both within Indonesia and in the world economy, Papua's comparative advantage will continue to lie in agriculture and natural resource-based industries for a long time to come. A more significant role for manufacturing is unlikely given the far lower cost of labour and better infrastructure in Java. But provided that there are substantial improvements in infrastructure and communications, over the longer term manufacturing can be expected to cluster around activities related to agriculture—for example, food processing.

== Infrastructure ==
Compared to other parts of Indonesia, the infrastructure in Papua is one of the most least developed, owing to its distance from the national capital Jakarta. Nevertheless, for the past few years, the central government has invested significant sums of money to build and improve the current infrastructure in the region. The infrastructure development efforts of the Ministry of Public Works and Housing in Papua have been very massive in the last 10 years. This effort is carried out to accelerate equitable development and support regional development in Papua. The main focus of infrastructure development in Papua is to improve regional connectivity, improve the quality of life through the provision of basic infrastructure and increase food security through the development of water resources infrastructure. The achievements and conditions of infrastructure development in Papua until 2017 have shown significant progress.

=== Energy and water resources ===
Electricity distribution in the region as well as the whole country is operated and managed by the Perusahaan Listrik Negara (PLN). Originally, most Papuan villages do not have access to electricity. The Indonesia government through the Ministry of Energy and Mineral Resources, in the beginning of year 2016, introduced a program named "Indonesia Terang" or Bright Indonesia. The aimed of this program is to speed up Electrification Rate (ER) with priority to the Papua region. The target of Indonesian's ER by 2019 is 97%. While the Indonesian's national ER already high (88.30%) in 2015, Papua still the lowest ER (45.93%) among the provinces. The scenario to boost up ER in the Eastern area by connected the consumers at villages which not electrified yet to the new Renewable Energy sources.

The percentage of household that were connected to the electricity in Papua (Electrification ratio/ER) is the lowest one among the provinces in Indonesia. Data from the Ministry of Energy and Mineral Resources shows that only Papua has ER level below 50% (45.93%) with the national average RE was 88.30%. High ER of more than 85% can be found in the rest of west area of the country. The main reason of lowest ER in Papua is a huge area with landlocked and mountain situation and low density population. Energy consumption in residential sector, 457 GWh in year 2014, contributes the electrification rate in Papua. But again, geographic and demographic obstacle made the electrical energy not well dispersed in Papua. The ER levels are usually higher in the coastal area but become low in the mountain area. These can be seen by the different rates between the provinces: Papua province has an ER of 89.22%, South Papua has an ER of 73.54%, Central Papua has an ER of 47.36%, and Highland Papua has an ER of 12.09%.

All pipes water supply in the region is managed by the Papua Municipal Waterworks (Indonesian: Perusahaan Daerah Air Minum Papua – PDAM Papua ). The supply of clean water is one of the main problem faced by the region, especially during drought seasons. Papua has been named as the region with the worst sanitation in Indonesia, garnering a score of 45 while the national average is 75, due to unhealthy lifestyle habits and a lack of clean water. In response, the government has invested money to build the sufficient infrastructure to hold clean water. Several new dams are also being built by the government throughout the region.

Achieving universal access to drinking water, sanitation and hygiene is essential to accelerating progress in the fields of health, education and poverty alleviation. In 2015, about a quarter of the population used basic sanitation facilities at home, while a third still practiced open defecation. The coverage of improved drinking water sources is much higher, both in households and schools. Inequality based on income and residence levels is stark, demonstrating the importance of integrating equity principles into policy and practice and expanding the coverage of community-based total sanitation programs.

=== Internet and telecommunication ===
Papua has the least amount of telecommunications services in Indonesia due to geographic isolation. The deployment of service to the district and to the sub district is still not evenly distributed. The distribution of telecommunication services in Papua is still very uneven. This is indicated by the percentage of the number of telecommunication services and infrastructure whose distribution is centralized in certain areas such as Jayapura. Based on data, the Human Development Index in Papua increases every year but is not accompanied by an increase adequate number of telecommunication facilities.

The Ministry of Communication and Information Technology through the Information Technology Accessibility Agency (BAKTI) has built around 9 base transceiver stations in remote areas of Papua, namely Puncak Jaya Regency and Mamberamo Raya Regency, to connect to internet access. In the early stages, the internet was prioritized to support the continuity of education, health and better public services. To realize connectivity in accordance with government priorities, the Ministry of Communication and Information is determined to reach all districts in the Papua region with high-speed internet networks by 2020. It is planned that all districts in the Papua region will build a fast internet backbone network. There are 31 regencies that have new high-speed internet access to be built.

In late 2019, the government announced the completion of the Palapa Ring project – a priority infrastructure project that aimed to provide access to 4G internet services to more than 500 regencies across Indonesia, Papua included. The project is estimated to have cost US$1.5 billion and comprises 35,000 km (22,000 mi) of undersea fibre-optic cables and 21,000 km (13,000 mi) of land cables, stretching from the westernmost city in Indonesia, Sabang to the easternmost town, Merauke, which is located in Papua. Additionally, the cables also transverse every district from the northernmost island Miangas to the southernmost island, Rote. Through the Palapa Ring, the government can facilitate a network capacity of up to 100 Gbit/s in even the most outlying regions of the country.

=== Transportation ===
==== Land ====
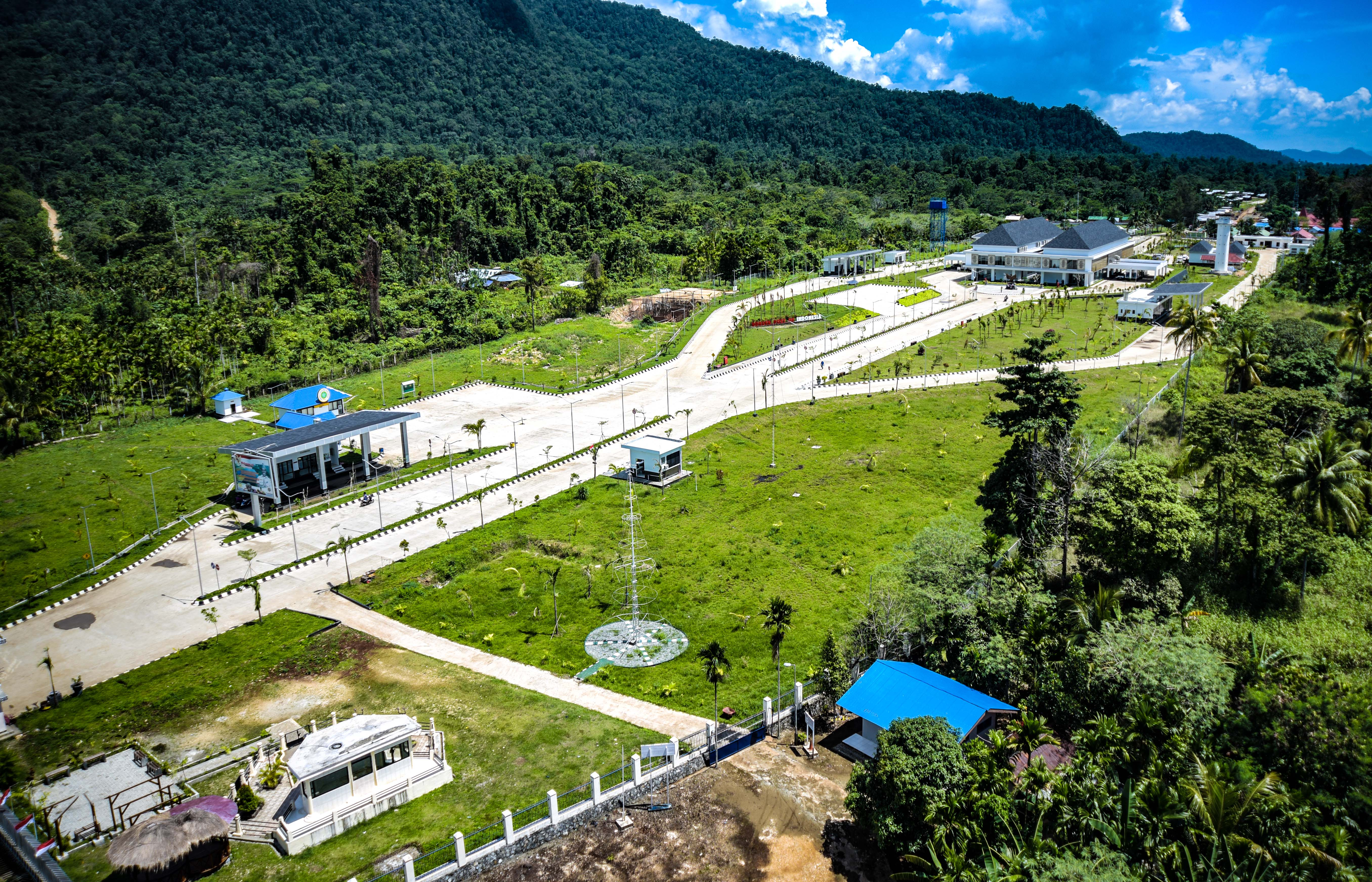
Skouw border checkpoint, on the Indonesia-Papua New Guinea border

So far, air routes have been a mainstay in the region as a means of transporting people and goods, including basic necessities, due to inadequate road infrastructure conditions. This has resulted in high distribution costs which have also increased the prices of various staple goods, especially in rural areas. Therefore, the government is trying to reduce distribution costs by building the Trans-Papua Highway. As of 2016, the Trans-Papua highway that has been connected has reached 835 kilometres (519 mi), with asphalt roads for 2,075 kilometres (1,289 mi), while the rest are still dirt roads, and roads that have not been connected have reached 827 km (514 mi). The development of the Trans-Papua highway will create connectivity between regions so that it can have an impact on the acceleration of economic growth in Papua and West Papua in the long term. Apart from the construction of the Trans-Papua highway, the government is also preparing for the first railway development project in Papua, which is currently entering the feasibility study phase. The said infrastructure funding for Papua is not insignificant. The need to connect all roads in Papua and West Papua is estimated at Rp. 12.5 trillion (US$870 million). In the 2016 State Budget, the government has also budgeted an additional infrastructure development fund of Rp. 1.8 trillion (US$126 million).

Data from the Ministry of Public Works and Housing states, the length of the Trans-Papua highway in Papua reaches 2,902 km (1,803 mi). These include Merauke-Tanahmerah-Waropko (543 km (337 mi)), Waropko-Oksibil (136 km (85 mi)), Dekai-Oksibil (225 km (140 mi)), and Kenyam-Dekai (180 km (110 mi)). Then, Wamena-Habema-Kenyam-Mamug (295 km (183 mi)), Jayapura-Elelim-Wamena (585 km (364 mi)), Wamena-Mulia-Ilaga-Enarotali (466 km), Wagete-Timika (196 km (122 mi)), and Enarotali-Wagete-Nabire (285 km (177 mi)). As of 2020, only about 200–300 kilometres (120–190 mi) of the Trans-Papua highwat have not been connected.

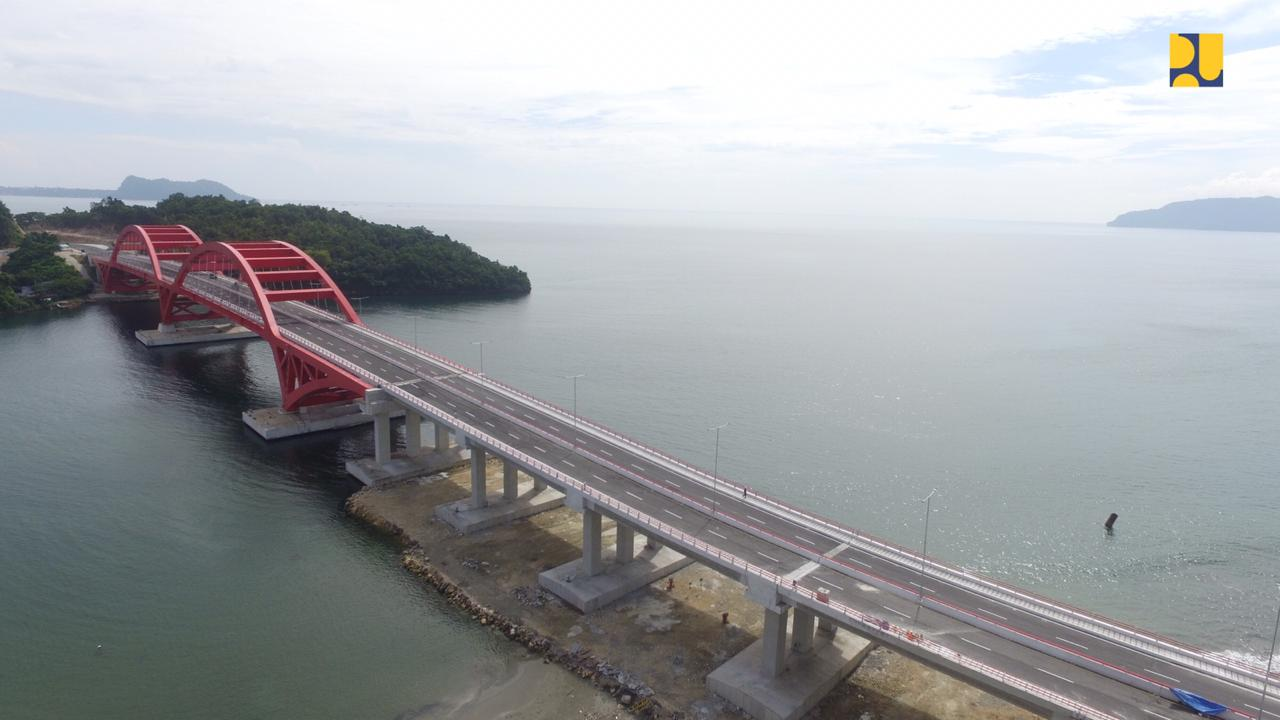
Youtefa Bridge, currently the longest bridge in Papua

As in the rest of Indonesia, Papua uses a dual carriageway with the left-hand traffic rule, and cities and towns such as Jayapura and Merauke provide public transportation services such as buses and taxis along with Gojek and Grab services. Currently, the Youtefa Bridge in Jayapura is the longest bridge in the region, with a total length of 732 metres (2,402 feet). The bridge cut the distance and travel time from Jayapura city center to Muara Tami district as well as Skouw State Border Post at Indonesia–Papua New Guinea border. The bridge construction was carried out by consortium of state-owned construction companies PT Pembangunan Perumahan Tbk, PT Hutama Karya (Persero), and PT Nindya Karya (Persero), with a total construction cost of IDR 1.87 trillion and support from the Ministry of Public Works and Housing worth IDR 1.3 trillion. The main span assembly of the Youtefa Bridge was not carried out at the bridge site, but at PAL Indonesia shipyard in Surabaya, East Java. Its production in Surabaya aims to improve safety aspects, improve welding quality, and speed up the implementation time to 3 months. This is the first time where the arch bridge is made elsewhere and then brought to the location. From Surabaya the bridge span, weighing 2000 tons and 112.5 m long, was sent by ship with a 3,200 kilometres‌ journey in 19 days. Installation of the first span was carried out on 21 February 2018, while the second span was installed on 15 March 2018 with an installation time of approximately 6 hours. The bridge was inaugurated on 28 October 2019 by President Joko Widodo.

A railway with a length of 205 km is being planned, which would connect the provincial capital Jayapura and Sarmi to the east. Further plans include connecting the railway to Sorong and Manokwari in West Papua. In total, the railway would have a length of 595 km, forming part of the Trans-Papua Railway. Construction of the railway is still in the planning stage. A Light Rapid Transport (LRT) connecting Jayapura and Sentani is also being planned.

==== Air ====
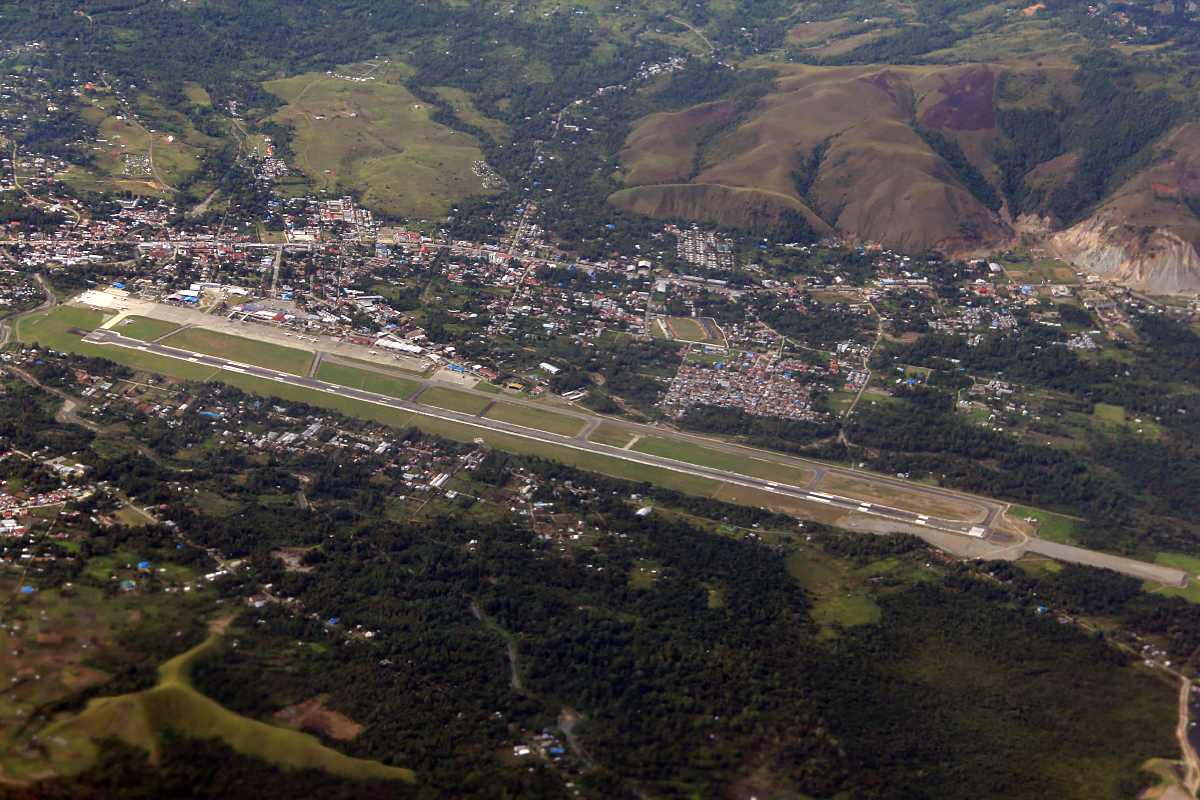
Sentani International Airport in Jayapura is the principal point of entry to Papua

The geographical conditions of Papua which are hilly and have dense forests and do not have adequate road infrastructure, such as in Java or Sumatra, make transportation a major obstacle for local communities. Air transportation using airplanes is by far the most effective means of transportation and is needed most by the inhabitants of the island, although it is not cheap for it. A number of airlines are also scrambling to take advantage of the geographical conditions of the island by opening busy routes to and from a number of cities, both district and provincial capitals. If seen from the sufficient condition of the airport infrastructure, there are not a few airports that can be landed by jets like Boeing and Airbus as well as propeller planes such as ATR and Cessna.

Sentani International Airport in Jayapura is the largest airport in the region, serving as the main gateway to the region from other parts of Indonesia. The air traffic is roughly divided between flights connecting to destinations within the Papua region and flights linking Papua to other parts of Indonesia. The airport connects Jayapura with other Indonesian cities such as Manado, Makassar, Surabaya and Jakarta, as well as towns within the region such as Biak, Timika and Merauke. Sentani International Airport is also the main base for several aviation organizations, including Associated Mission Aviation, Mission Aviation Fellowship, YAJASI and Tariku Aviation. The airport currently does not have any international flights, although there are plans to open new airline routes to neighbouring‌ Papua New Guinea in the future. Other medium-sized airports in the region are Mozes Kilangin Airport in Timika, Mopah International Airport in Merauke, Frans Kaisiepo International Airport in Biak, and Wamena Airport in Wamena. There are over 300 documented airstrips in Papua, consisting of mostly small airstrips that can only be landed by small airplanes. The government is planning to open more airports in the future to connect isolated areas in the region.

==== Water ====
Water transportation, which includes sea and river transportation, is also one of the most crucial form of transportation in the region, after air transportation. The number of passengers departing by sea in Papua in October 2019 decreased by 16.03 percent, from 18,785 people in September 2019 to 15,773 people. The number of passengers arriving by sea in October 2019 decreased by 12.32 percent, from 11,108 people in September 2019 to 9,739 people. The volume of goods loaded in October 2019 was recorded at 17,043 tons, an increase of 30.57 percent compared to the volume in September 2019 which amounted to 13,053 tons. The volume of goods unloaded in October 2019 was recorded at 117,906 tons or a decrease of 2.03 percent compared to the volume in September 2019 which amounted to 120,349 tons.

There are several ports in the region, with the Port of Depapre in Jayapura being the largest, which started operation in 2021. There are also small to medium-sized ports in Biak, Timika, Merauke and Agats, which serves passenger and cargo ships within the region, as well as from other Indonesian provinces.

=== Healthcare ===
Health-related matters in the Papua is administered by the Papua Provincial Health Agency (Indonesian: Dinas Kesehatan Provinsi Papua). According to the Indonesian Central Agency on Statistics, as of 2015, there are around 13,554 hospitals in Papua which consists of 226 state-owned hospitals and 13,328 private hospitals. Furthermore, there are 394 clinics spread throughout the region. The most prominent hospital is the Papua Regional General Hospital (Indonesian: Rumah Sakit Umum Daerah Papua) in Jayapura, which is the largest state-owned hospital in the region.

Papua is reported to have the highest rates of child mortality and HIV/AIDS in Indonesia. Lack of good healthcare infrastructure is one of the main issues in Papua as of today, especially in the remote regions, as most hospitals that have adequate facilities are only located at major cities and towns. A measles outbreak and famine killed at least 72 people in Asmat regency in early 2018, during which 652 children were affected by measles and 223 suffered from malnutrition.

=== Education ===
Education in Papua, as well as Indonesia in a whole, falls under the responsibility of the Ministry of Education and Culture (Kementerian Pendidikan dan Kebudayaan or Kemdikbud) and the Ministry of Religious Affairs (Kementerian Agama or Kemenag). In Indonesia, all citizens must undertake twelve years of compulsory education which consists of six years at elementary level and three each at middle and high school levels. Islamic schools are under the responsibility of the Ministry of Religious Affairs. The Constitution also notes that there are two types of education in Indonesia: formal and non-formal. Formal education is further divided into three levels: primary, secondary and tertiary education. Indonesians are required to attend 12 years of school, which consists of three years of primary school, three years of secondary school and three years of high school.

As of 2015, there are 3 public universities and 40 private universities in Papua. Public universities in Papua fall under the responsibility of the Ministry of Research and Technology (Kementerian Riset dan Teknologi) as well as the Ministry of Education and Culture. The most famous university in the region is the Cenderawasih University in Jayapura. The university has faculties in economics, law, teacher training and education, medical, engineering, and social and political science. Until 2002 the university had a faculty of agricultural sciences at Manokwari, which was then separated to form the Universitas Negeri Papua.

== Culture ==
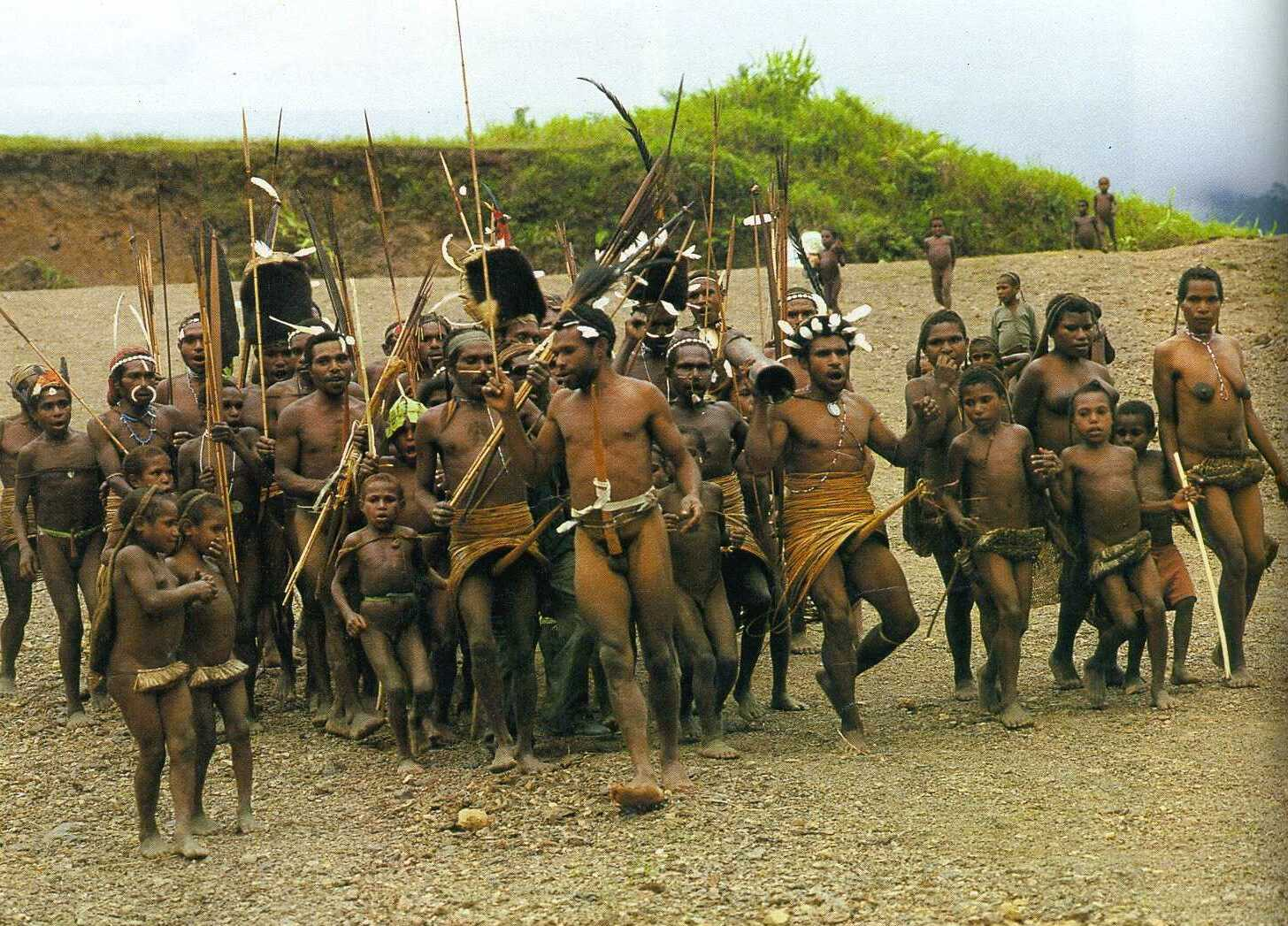
Yali in the Yahukimo Regency

Papuans have significant cultural affinities with the inhabitants of Papua New Guinea. As in Papua New Guinea, the peoples of the highlands have traditions and languages distinct from the peoples of the coast, such as sago being the staple food of the coastal Papuans, a tradition shared with many people in Eastern Indonesia. In the highlands where sago does not grow, tubers (sweet potato, yam, and taro) are the staple foods. In some parts of the highlands, the koteka (penis gourd) is still worn by men during ceremonies, while the use of the holim (koteka of the Dani people) as everyday dress by Dani men in Western New Guinea is now uncommon. As of 2019, it is estimated that only 10% of the highland population (in Central Papua and Highland Papua) regularly uses koteka, and it is only worn during cultural festivals or purchased as a souvenir. A culture of inter-tribal warfare and animosity between neighbouring‌ tribes has long been present in the highlands.

=== Cuisine ===
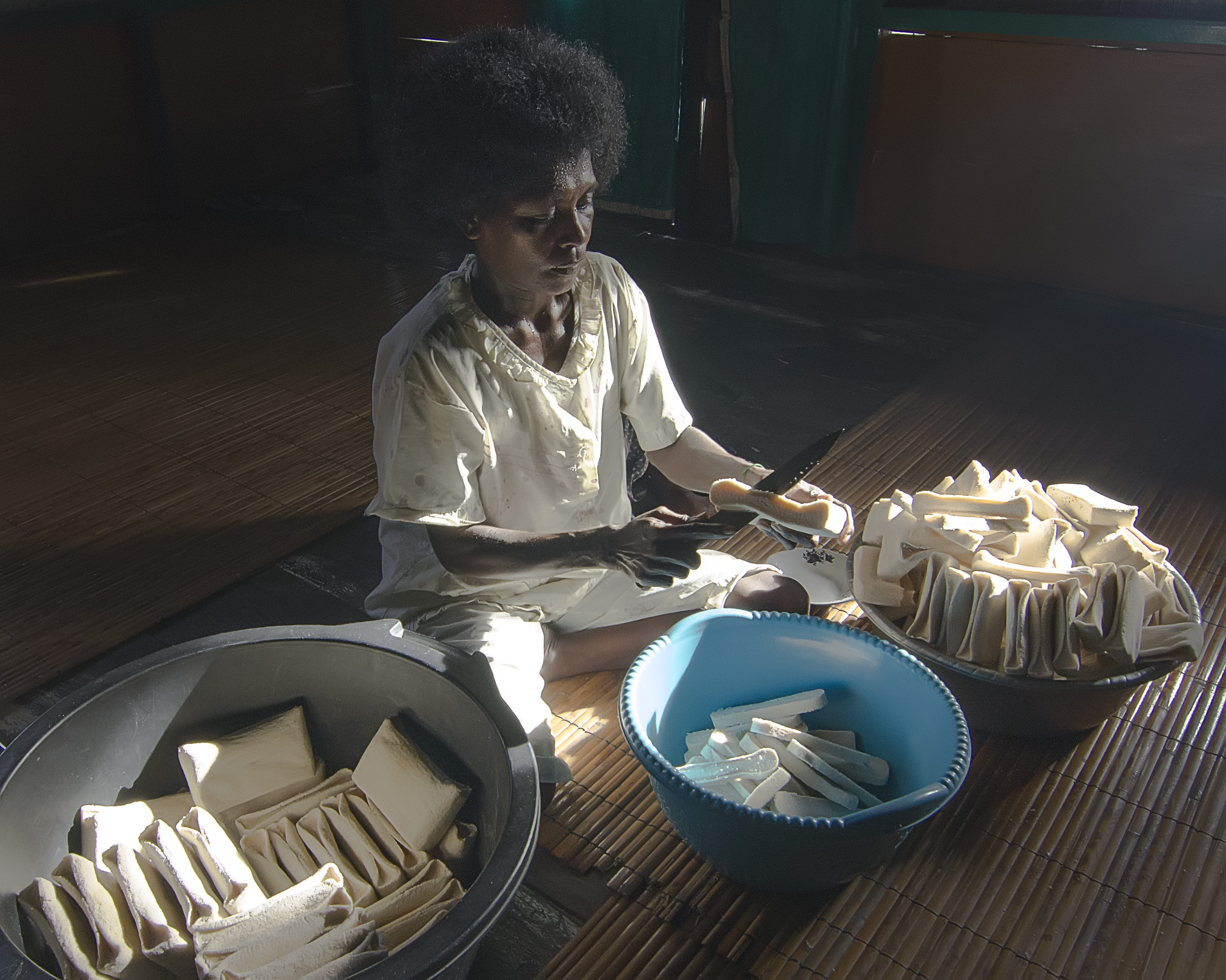
Sago is a typical Papuan food, which is usually made into papeda.

The native Papuan food usually consists of roasted boar with tubers such as sweet potato. The staple food of Papua and eastern Indonesia in general is sago, as the counterpart of central and western Indonesian cuisines that favour rice as their staple food. Sago is either processed as a pancake or sago congee called papeda, usually eaten with yellow soup made from tuna, red snapper or other fishes spiced with turmeric, lime, and other spices. On some coasts and lowlands on Papua, sago is the main ingredient to all the foods. Sagu bakar, sagu lempeng and sagu bola are well-known dishes in Papua, especially in the custom folk culinary tradition of Mappi, Asmat and Mimika. Papeda is one of the sago foods that is rarely found. As Papua is considered as a non-Muslim majority regions, pork is readily available everywhere. In Papua, pig roasts of pork and yams use heated stones placed in a hole dug in the ground and covered with leaves; this cooking method is called bakar batu (burning the stone), and it is an important cultural and social event among Papuan people.

In the coastal regions, seafood is the main food for the local people. One of the best known seafoods from Papua is fish wrap (Indonesian: ikan bungkus). Wrapped fish in other areas is called pepes ikan. Wrapped fish from Papua is made with extra bay leaves so that the mixture of spices is more fragrant and soaks into the fish meat. The basic ingredient of Papuan wrapped fish is sea fish; the most commonly used fish is milkfish. Milkfish is suitable for "wrap" because its meat does not crumble after processing. The spices are sliced or cut into pieces, namely, red and bird's eye chilies, bay leaves, tomatoes, galangal, and lemongrass stalks. Other spices are turmeric, garlic and red, red chilies, coriander, and hazelnut. The spices are first crushed and then mixed or smeared on the fish. The wrapping is in banana leaves.

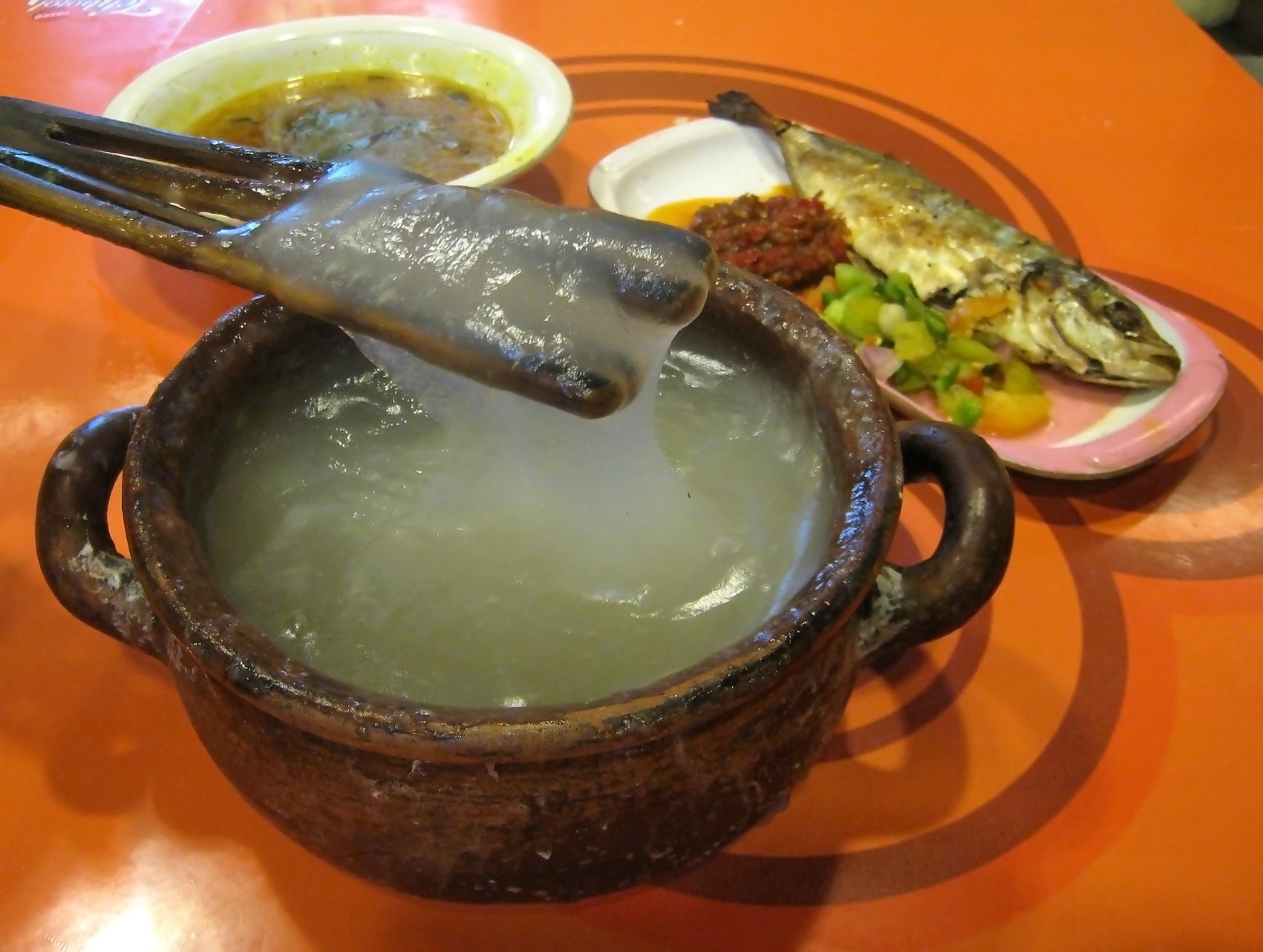
Papeda, a notable dish originating from Eastern Indonesia

Common Papuan snacks are usually made out of sago. Kue bagea (also called sago cake) is a cake originating from Ternate in North Maluku, although it can also be found in Papua. It has a round shape and creamy colour. Bagea has a hard consistency that can be softened in tea or water, to make it easier to chew. It is prepared using sago, a plant-based starch derived from the sago palm or sago cycad. Sagu Lempeng is a typical Papuan snacks that is made in the form of processed sago in the form of plates. Sagu Lempeng are also a favourite for travellers. But it is very difficult to find in places to eat because this bread is a family consumption and is usually eaten immediately after cooking. Making sago plates is as easy as making other breads. Sago is processed by baking it by printing rectangles or rectangles with iron which is ripe like white bread. Initially tasteless, but recently it has begun to vary with sugar to get a sweet taste. It has a tough texture and can be enjoyed by mixing it or dipping it in water to make it softer. Sago porridge is a type of porridge that are found in Papua. This porridge is usually eaten with yellow soup made of mackerel or tuna then seasoned with turmeric and lime. Sago porridge is sometimes also consumed with boiled tubers, such as those from cassava or sweet potato. Vegetable papaya flowers and sautéed kale are often served as side dishes to accompany the sago porridge. In the coastal regions, Sago worms are usually served as a type of snack dish. Sago worms come from sago trunks which are cut and left to rot. The rotting stems cause the worms to come out. The shape of the sago worms varies, ranging from the smallest to the largest size of an adult's thumb. These sago caterpillars are usually eaten alive or cooked beforehand, such as stir-frying, cooking, frying and then skewered. But over time, the people of Papua used to process these sago caterpillars into sago caterpillar satay. To make satay from this sago caterpillar, the method is no different from making satay in general, namely on skewers with a skewer and grilled over hot coals.

== Foreign journalism ==
The Indonesian government is very strict in giving foreign journalists permission to enter Western New Guinea, considering that this region is very vulnerable to separatist movements. As formerly in East Timor, Indonesia's former territory, the Indonesian administration takes great efforts to filter the information that gets out of Western New Guinea. However, there is no prohibition for journalists to go to the region. In 2012, the Ministry of Foreign Affairs received 11 applications for permission to cover Papua from a number of foreign media. Of 11 requests, five were approved while the other six were rejected. Meanwhile, in 2013, requests for permission to cover Papua by foreign media soared to 28. At that time, the ministry approved 21 letters of application and rejected the other seven.

The process of admitting foreign press and NGOs, which was previously complicated, began to be facilitated in 2015. Kompas.com explained that Jokowi officially revoked the ban on foreign journalists from entering Papua. According to him, Papua is the same as other regions of Indonesia. However, as of today foreign journalists are still required to apply for permission to enter Papua through the Ministry of Foreign Affairs.

== See also ==
- Free Papua Movement
- Kurima Valley
- List of rivers of Western New Guinea
- Papua conflict
- Terianus Satto
