= Maniwak =

- Location in West Papua and Indonesia Maniwak (Indonesia)
- Coordinates: 2°43′21.9586″S 134°34′24.9996″E
- Country: Indonesia
- Province: West Papua
- Regency: Teluk Wondama Regency
- District: Wasior District
- Elevation: 4,695 ft (1,431 m)

Population (2010)
  - Total: 2,174
- Time zone: UTC+9 (Indonesia Eastern Standard Time)

Maniwak is a village in Wasior district, Teluk Wondama Regency in West Papua province, Indonesia. Its population in 2010 was 2174.

== Climate ==
Maniwak has a cool tropical rainforest climate (Af) due to altitude with heavy rainfall year-round.

Climate data for Maniwak
Month	Jan	Feb	Mar	Apr	May	Jun	Jul	Aug	Sep	Oct	Nov	Dec	Year
Mean daily maximum °C (°F)	24.9 (76.8)	24.8 (76.6)	24.5 (76.1)	24.0 (75.2)	23.3 (73.9)	22.3 (72.1)	21.4 (70.5)	21.4 (70.5)	22.5 (72.5)	23.8 (74.8)	24.5 (76.1)	24.8 (76.6)	23.5 (74.3)
Daily mean °C (°F)	20.3 (68.5)	20.2 (68.4)	20.2 (68.4)	20.0 (68.0)	19.7 (67.5)	19.0 (66.2)	18.4 (65.1)	18.3 (64.9)	18.9 (66.0)	19.6 (67.3)	20.0 (68.0)	20.2 (68.4)	19.6 (67.2)
Mean daily minimum °C (°F)	15.7 (60.3)	15.7 (60.3)	16.0 (60.8)	16.0 (60.8)	16.1 (61.0)	15.7 (60.3)	15.4 (59.7)	15.2 (59.4)	15.3 (59.5)	15.5 (59.9)	15.6 (60.1)	15.7 (60.3)	15.7 (60.2)
Average precipitation mm (inches)	272 (10.7)	299 (11.8)	269 (10.6)	264 (10.4)	276 (10.9)	251 (9.9)	232 (9.1)	232 (9.1)	220 (8.7)	225 (8.9)	233 (9.2)	258 (10.2)	3,031 (119.5)
Source: Climate-Data.org
