= Sran =

Sran could refer to:

- Barinder Sran (born 1992), Indian cricketer
- Kingdom of Sran, former kingdom in present-day Indonesia
