= Wasior =

District in Teluk Wondama, West Papua, Indonesia

Wasior Indonesian: Wasior
- District
- Location in Western New Guinea
- Coordinates: 2.717°S 134.483°E
- Country: Indonesia
- Region: Western New Guinea
- Province: West Papua
- Regency: Teluk Wondama Regency
- Elevation: 15 m (49 ft)

Population (2022)
  - Total: 20,890
- Time zone: UTC+9 (Indonesia Eastern Time)

Wasior (Indonesian: Wasior) is a town and a district (kecamatan) of Teluk Wondama Regency, in the Indonesian province of West Papua.

Wasior is divided into nine villages and one kelurahan for administrative purposes. Although, the continuous settlement consisting of Kelurahan Wasior I and Kampung Wasior II, is the largest settlement in Teluk Wondama Regency. In this settlement there are shops, churches, a seaport and an airport.
