= Kingdom of Kaimana =

Islamic kingdom in West Papua, Indonesia

Kingdom of Kaimana کرجاءن سرن ايمن مواون Kerajaan Sran Eman Muun Petuanan Kaimana
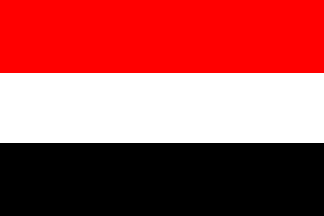
- Flag

- Map of the kingdom of Kaimana on the Bomberai Peninsula
- Capital: Kaimana
- Common languages: Papuan Malay, Kowiai, other Papuan languages (native)
- Religion: Sunni Islam (after 16th century)
- Government: Kingdom (Petuanan)
- Rat Sran
  - 1309–unknown: Imaga (Rat Sran Nati Patimunin I)
  - unknown: Basir Onin (Rat Sran Adi II)
  - 1348–1440: Woran (Rat Sran Rat Adi III)
  - 1808–1898: Nduvin (Rat Sran E'man IV)
  - 1898–1923: Naro'e (Rat Sran E'man V)
  - 1923–1966: Ahmad Aituarauw (Rat Sran Rat Eman Umisi VI)
  - 1966–1980: Muhammad Rais Aituarauw (Rat Sran Rat Kaimana Umisi VII)
  - 1980–present: Abdul Hakim Achmad Aituarauw (Rat Sran Rat Kaimana VIII)
- Today part of: Indonesia

The Kingdom of Kaimana (Papuan Malay: Petuanan Kaimana; Jawi: کرجاءن سرن ايمن مواون) or Kingdom of Sran is one of the oldest Muslim kingdoms in West Papua, now Indonesia. The kingdom was established by Imaga, with the title Rat Sran Nati Pattimuni, traditionally in 1309.

== History ==
=== Early history ===
According to oral history, the ancestor of Sran kingdom came from Mbaham mountains, more specifically in Kumawa Mountains and Baik Bay, These regions were called Pattimunin. Imaga unified the villages and surrounding tribes under his influence by visiting and marriages, unifying the customs and took on the title Rat Sran Nati Patimunin I. "Rat" means king while "Sran" was the region name which encompasses his influence. He made his capital in Weri, in Tunas Gain Bay in Fakfak. In ruling the kingdom, the king has two companions with equal standing under customary law although in practice both were under the king rule, "duduvura adat" which is the tribal council and "Raja Muda" which is usually the king's son. There are also numerous advisors, which includes religious leaders, ahli nujum (shaman), mayora, sangaji, hukom, joujau, kapitang (general) or kapitang laut (admiral) and Orang Kaya (richer men with influence). Imaga had a brother, Imuli who also founded a kingdom, called Kingdom of Baham who ruled from Gar Ati Unin, whose descendants now are known as, Joupiad and Padudade, which are families with customary land right in Baham, Kokas, and Kapaur (old name for Fakfak).

After the death of Imaga, his son, Basir Onin took the throne and move his capital to Borombouw, Adi Island. This was because the location was considered strategic for trade. He took on the title Rat Sran Adi II. After he retired his son, Woran became king. Under the reign of Woran, the kingdom prospered and many villages were under his influence. His primary methods of expansion was through marriage and not conquest. Under his reign, according to legends, Gajah Mada visited his palace in Borombouw, Adi Island. This Kraton or palace was known as "San Nabe", and in there Gajah Mada gave a Majapahit flag, which was a Red and White coloured flag, and other gifts. In exchange King Woran, gave a daughter and a bird of paradise (Syangga). These contacts between Sran Kingdom and Majapahit was recorded in Negarakertagama which mention a "Sran" as one of regions under Majapahit tributary influence. This 15th century contacts by the Javanese were also recorded in folk stories from people of Patipi Bay to Rumbati.

After the death of Woran, the records are unclear. There supposedly three more kings after Woran, whose influences did not reach the level of Woran. There was also an invasion by Tidore Sultanate supposedly in 1498 during the Hongi expeditions, which suggest Sran Kingdom fell under the influence of Tidore after this. After which, Sran had to send tribute in the form of slaves and yellow bird of paradise as well as spices. The royal family converted to Islam presumably in the 16th century, after moving to Adi island, although the exact date is not known. While according to oral history, islamisation of the region was attributed to Syarif Muaz al-Qathan, which was a Sufi from Yemen. He was also known as "Syekh Juba Biru" or the blue coated Sheikh, who in 15th century successfully converted an Adi ruler by the name of Ade Aria Way to islam, who took the name Samay. According to oral history, the king also invited Alhamid from Maluku with Arab descent to serve as Imam in the community, whose descendants still present in the region till this day. According to Memorie-(Vervolg) van Overgave van de (Onder) Afdeeling West Nieuw Guinea, 1932, Tidore raised a figure called Mayor Wanggita to be king in Adi and Aiduma islands. Although his descendants, did not able to maintain their influence.

The interregnum caused by family infighting continued, until in 1808, Nduvin (the fifth generation descendant of Samay) became the Rat Sran IV. He moved the capital which was still centered in Borombouw, Adi Island, to E'man which is currently known as Kaimana. He married a Wai Princess, from Bonggofut. She had a family name of Ai which originated from Natau mountain in Faranyau (Sara village), which was named Mimbe Werifun. He had a son which is named Nawaratu, or more commonly known as Naro'e. Under the reign of Nduvin, Tidore was recognized as the suzerain of West Papua, and Tidore was in turn a protectorate of Netherlands. In 1828, Netherlands constructed "Fort Du Bus" in Lobo, Namatota, in Kaimana. In the ceremony, multiple tribes and kingdoms was invited which include, Sendawan (King of Namatota), Kassa (King of Lahakia) and Lutu ("Orang Kaya" from Lobo and Mawara). The Dutch recognize these three men as leader of the regions which was symbolized by three silver batons. Under those three, The Netherlands also recognized another twenty eight tribes or vassal kingdom. As a result, Sran Kingdom was recognized under the rule of Namatota Kingdom. Nduvin did not resist the rule of Namatota, and he focused more on fighting and resisting the Hongi expeditions or Hongitochten. In 1898, Nduvin died, and his son Naro'e took power.

=== Colonial period ===
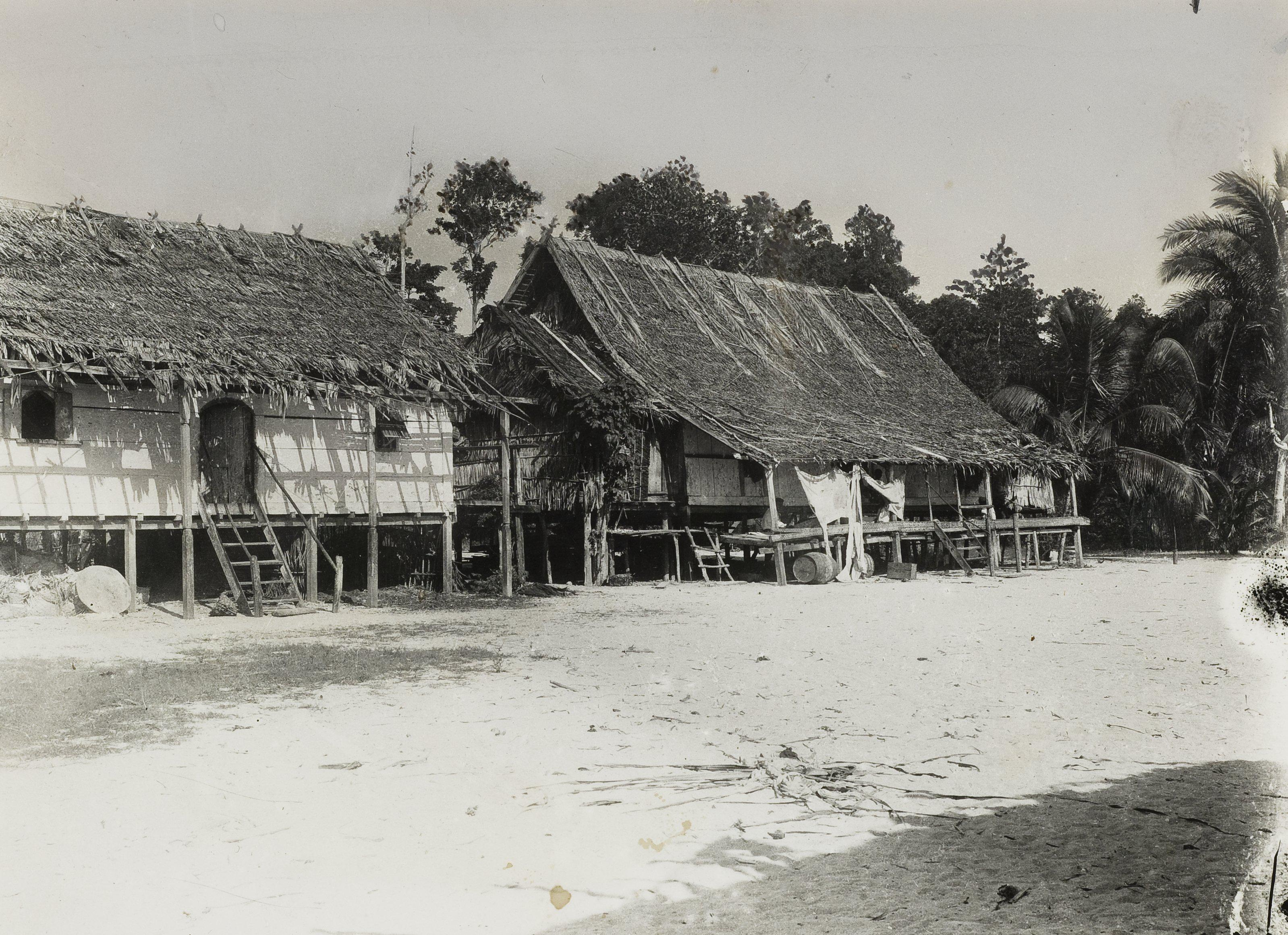
Kampung Kaimana with the Rat Umisi (Commissioned King) house on the right, 1907–1915

Under the reign of Naro'e, The Netherlands started to administer the region of New Guinea more directly, Afdeeling Noord Nieuw Guinea was set up and to the south, Afdeeling West en Zuid Nieuw Guinea. These two regions was under the control of resident in Moluccas. Directly circumventing the rule of Naro'e which continued to expand his influence by marrying his family with Fimbay and Rafideso in Miwara, with Kamakula dynasty in Uduma, with Nanggewa family from Bicari Bay, with Nambobo and Ai in Mbaham Iha regions with Boki Sekar. In other pursuits, he fought the expanding Hongi expeditions in his territory with troops called "Sabakor". Naro’e also formed closer relationship with Namatota Kingdom. He married his daughter, Koviai Bata with Lakatei who became king of Wertuar. Another daughter, Sekar Bata was married with Lamora, king of Namatota. In 1912, he went to Bintuni Bay to meet with Captain Keyts, where he was informed that the Netherlands had set up a government of New guinea, directly invalidating his territory and rule. As a result, he went into exile in Kokas and Babo, for about 10 Years. In this time, his son, Ahmad Aituarauw became the administrator of his capital. In 1922, he returned to his capital in Kaimana, where he instructed the villages to open roads and make palm plantation in Sararota, Nusa Venda, Nanesa, Bitsyari and Lobo. In 1923, he died and was buried next to Baitul Rahim Great Mosque. The Netherland Indies government gave the rule (with no political power other than matters relating to cultural) of Kaimana to Ahmad Aituarauw with the title of "Commission King Kaimana" in local language is "Rat Sran Rat Eman Umisi VI", where he ruled from 1923 to 1966. He was cooperative with the Dutch authorities and received Order of Orange-Nassau in 1930.

His son Muhammad Achmad, is more commonly known as Bestuur Achmad. This is because he became HBA (Hoofd Bestuur Administratie, head of civil service administration) and an elected member of Nieuw Guinea Raad (NGR) in Hollandia, and later a member of the Indonesian Supreme Advisory Council (1966-1968). He retired from kingship in 1980. He was an Indonesian nationalist who founded the pro-Indonesian movement, (Indonesian: 'Merdeka Bersama Kaimana Irian Barat', MBKIB, Independence With Kaimana West Irian) which boycotted Queen Wilhelmina's birthday celebrations, after meeting with Frans Kaisiepo in Biak in December 1946. Meanwhile King of Kaimana at the time, Achmad Aituarauw, and King of Namatota, Muhammad Kasim Ombaier communicated with Silas Papare to send a copy of Linggadjati Agreement to be distributed through the use of Chinese descent Abubakar Tjan Kok Tjiang, who had more freedom of movement. To disrupt these activities Dutch authority exiled Muhammad Achmad from Kaimana as district head of Ayamaru for 10 years in 1948.

== Current status ==
Like most other traditional polities in Indonesia, the Kingdom of Kaimana has no formal political power ex officio. However, the establishment of the Kaimana Regency, the traditional domain of the kingdom, in 2002 has resulted in the resurgence of the royal family's influence. The eighth King of Kaimana, Abdul Hakim Achmad Aituarauw, who is the third son of Muhammad Achmad Aituarauw, is a former member of West Papua People's Representative Council (DPRPB), whose eldest brother is Hasan Achmad Aituarauw, two-time bupati (regent) of Kaimana Regency (2003–2010 and 2025–2030). Another member of the royal family, Sarifa Aituarauw, is also serving as an appointed member of the Kaimana Regency Council (DPRK) as a women's representative within the framework of special autonomy (Otsus).

The current (ninth) king is Mohammad Natsir Aituarauw, who took office in 2022.

== List of rulers ==
Name	Title	Reign
Imaga	Rat Sran Nati Patimunin I	1309–unknown
Basir Onin	Rat Sran Adi II	unknown–1348
Woran	Rat Sran Rat Adi III	1348–1440
Interregnum or no information		1440–1808
Nduvin	Rat Sran E'man IV	1808–1898
Narawatu or Naro'e or Iwafusa	Rat Sran E'man V	1898–1923
Ahmad Aituarauw	Rat Sran Rat Eman Umisi VI	1923–1966
Muhammad Achmad Rais Aituarauw	Rat Sran Rat Kaimana Umisi VII	1966–1980
Abdul Hakim Achmad Aituarauw	Rat Sran Rat Kaimana Umisi VIII	1980–present

== Legacies ==
The royal palace of Sran and a fort were already destroyed, except the Grand Mosque Baitul Rahim as well as the burial complex for Sran royals. This burial complex located on the north of the mosque, contains the grave of the Rat Sran V, Iwafusa; wife of Rat Sran VI, Salma Hakim; and Rat Sran VI, Ahmad Aituarauw. The southeast burial complex are for ulama located inside public cemetery. Chinese burial complex are located to the east of the mosque, or southeast of chinatown.

The mosque was already repaired and reconstructed five times. In 1953, it was reconstructed with the original timber exchanged with cement and rocks but still maintaining the original design. In 1970, porches were added to the north, east, and south. As a result it already lost much of its original design. Currently the royal family are trying to collect and find the royal heirloom which was spread all over Eastern Indonesia. Some of the heirlooms were found in Gowa Sultanate, South Sulawesi, because of past royal marriages. A museum was planned to display most of the heirlooms.

== See also ==
- Spice trade
- List of Sunni Muslim dynasties
