= Mogoi Baru =

- Kampung/Kelurahan
- Location in West Papua Province
- Coordinates: 1°52′0″S 133°14′0″E
- Country: Indonesia
- Province: West Papua
- Regency: Teluk Bintuni Regency
- District: Tembuni
- Time zone: UTC+9 (WIT)

Mogoi Baru is a village in Tembuni District, Teluk Bintuni Regency, West Papua, Indonesia. The town is located in the southeastern-central part of the Bird's Head Peninsula.
