= Kingdom of Namatota =

Kingdom in Papua

- 16th century–Early 20 century
- Capital: Namatota
- Common languages: Irarutu
- Religion: Sunni Islam
- Ratu, Sendawan
  - 16th century: Ulan Tua
  - 19th century: Sendawan
- History
  - Established: 16th century
  - Disestablished: Early 20 century
- Today part of: Indonesia

The Kingdom of Namatota was an Islamic kingdom that once existed in what is now Kaimana Regency from the 16th century until the early 20th century. The center of power of the Namatota Kingdom was located on Namatota Island, and its territory covered the area from Arguni Bay to Umar Bay. The Namatota Kingdom maintained political relations with the Sultanate of Tidore. The inhabitants of the Namatota Kingdom spoke the Irarutu language. In Namatota, Islam was used as an identity to legitimize the ruler’s authority and the kingdom did not have religious institutions to the dissemination of its teachings.

== History ==
According to the oral traditions of the Mairasi people, the origin of the Kingdom of Namatota stemmed from a division within the people on Miwara Island in Triton Bay, Kaimana. At that time, Miwara Island was an important port along the trade routes of the Papua region, serving merchants from Seram and Bugis-Makassar. This was because the local people did not permit these traders to enter the inland areas directly. Miwara Island was ruled by a king who governed and oversaw these commercial activities. If any traders attempted to bypass the port and enter the production areas directly, the king would order their ships to be sunk and their crews killed. The king who led the Port of Miwara during its period of prosperity was known as Sendawan Mawara.

After a division occurred among Miwara residents, Sendawan Mawara left the region, and some Miwara people moved to Namatota Island (Kob'jai). There, they established their own kingdom and appointed a king named Ulontua Keliobas (also known as Ulantua, Ulon Swarga, or Wolangtua), who was said to have originated from Gorom in East Seram and is regarded as the ancestor of the Ombaier clan in Namatota. However, the Ombaier clan said that their ancestors came from Mount Baik. It was with these events that the Kingdom of Namatota was founded.

Meanwhile, the people who remained on Miwara Island appointed their own leader, bearing the title Orang Kaya, from the lineage of the previous king. Both community leaders also adopted the title Sendawan (meaning “strong person” or “mighty person”) in honor of the earlier ruler and to preserve his name. It is not known exactly when this division took place. However, the people of Lobo and Miwara remember the last leader who managed the trade between the local communities and outside regions was Raja Muda Neonda.

According to the oral stories of the Kuri people, they recognized the authority of the King of Namatota (locally known as ratu) based on a historical contest between the ancestors of the Refideso and Ombaier clans for royal power. The struggle was ultimately decided through a diving contest: each contestant had to dive to the bottom of a mountain while carrying a flame, and whoever resurfaced with the flame still burning would be declared the winner. The contest was won by the ancestor of the Refideso clan. Nevertheless, an agreement was reached in which he would remain the “Mountain King” (Ratu Gunung), while the ancestor of the Ombaier clan was entrusted with the mandate to serve as king. The exact date of this event is unknown, but it must have occurred after Namatota had already separated from Miwara and had become an intermediary trading center linking inland communities (such as the Kuri people) with outside regions.

When the Dutch East Indies sought to establish Fort Du Bus at the foot of Mount Emansiri in Triton Bay, Lobo, on 24 August 1828, the inauguration ceremony was also attended by several local leaders. These included Sendawan, the King of Namatota (whose name was not recorded), Kassa, the King of Lahakia, and Lutu, an Orang Kaya (local chief or notable leader) from Mawara (Miwara) and Lobo. This event marked an important moment of interaction between the Dutch colonial authorities and the indigenous political leaders of the region.

The Kingdom of Namatota sometimes unilaterally exercised influence through the Kingdom of Sran as far as the western coastal areas of Mimika, where a Namatota-style colony was established within the Sran Kingdom's territory. A Kamoro leader named Naowa had a good relationship with the King of Namatota, Mooi, because his father, Lamora, a previous King of Namatota, had granted him a royal title as the leader of the Tarya We Confederation. However, the Kamoro people were actually subjects of the King of Kaimana.

== Territory of rule ==
The Kingdom of Namatota was one of the kingdoms in Papua. The territory of the Namatota Kingdom now covers part of Kaimana Regency. The territory of the Namatota Kingdom was located in Namatota, which was inhabited by the Koiway people. The center of power of Namatota was on Namatota Island.

== Political relations ==
The Namatota began interacting with the Dutch in Papua in the 1820s, during the reign of King Sendawan. However, the Dutch only visited Namatota as a stopover for boats involved in the Hongi Expeditions. During the reign of King Wolang Tua in the Namatota Kingdom, from the late 19th century to the early 20th century, the Sultanate of Tidore assisted Namatota in expanding its territory, which resulted in the annexation of the southern coastal area of Arguni Bay. Subsequently, the territory of the Namatota Kingdom extended from Arguni Bay to Umar Bay. Because of the Sultanate of Tidore’s assistance in the territorial expansion of the Namatota Kingdom, the appointment of customary chiefs in the conquered territories of the Namatota was carried out in the name of the Sultan of Tidore.

== Language and religion ==
The inhabitants of the Namatota spoke the Irarutu language. The Namatota was a kingdom whose rulers adopted Islam as their religion from the 16th century. The first ruler of the Namatota Kingdom to convert to Islam was Ulan Tua. In the Namatota, Islam functioned solely as an identity for the rulers, and there were no religious institutions to disseminate its teachings among the population, so Islam did not become the majority religion practiced by the people of Namatota. The rulers of the Namatota Kingdom used Islam only as an identity to legitimize their authority derived from the Sultanate of Tidore, which held extensive power in Papua. As a result, Islam did not become the majority religion in the Namatota until the end of the first half of the 20th century.

== List of Rulers ==
The following is the list of rulers of the Kingdom of Namatota:

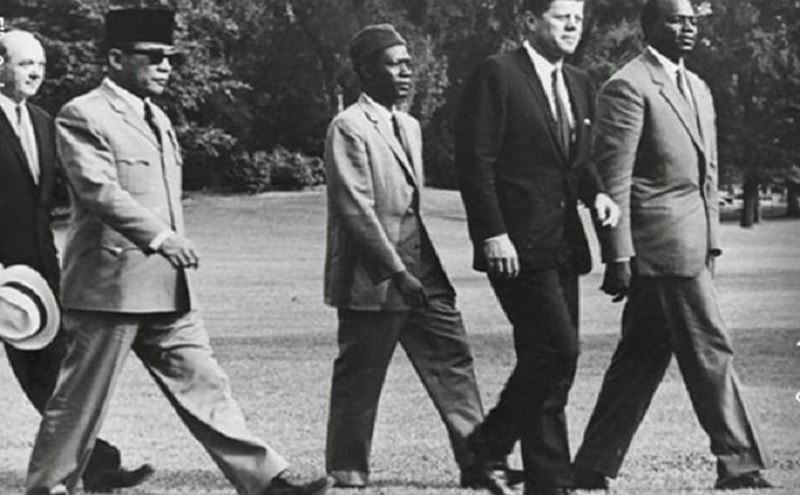
Sukarno, Muhammad Kasim Ombaier, dan John F. Kennedy in the US, 1961.

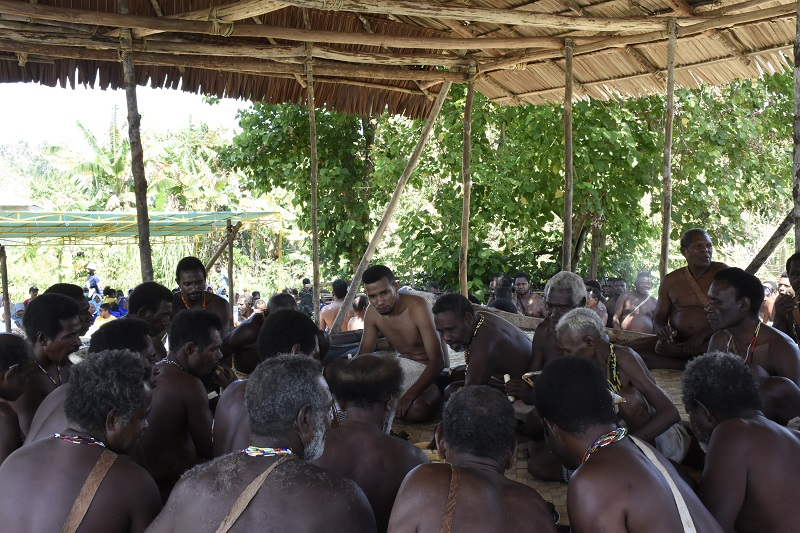
The coronation of Randi Asnawi Ombaier as the King of Namatota by the Kuri people in 2020

Name	Title	Reign	Notes
Wolangtoea		1828 - ?	from Gorom
Sifa		? - ?	brother
Lamora		?–1911	child
Mooi Boeserau		1911–1946	child
Muhammad Kasim		1946–1973	
Hayum		1973–2013	
Randi Asnawi		2017–now	
