= Rasiei =

- District
- Interactive map of Rasiei
- Coordinates: 2°49′36″S 134°33′17″E
- Country: Indonesia
- Province: West Papua
- Regency: Wondama Bay

Area
  - Total: 194.53 km^{2} (75.11 sq mi)

Population (mid 2023 estimate)
  - Total: 4,540
  - Density: 23.3/km^{2} (60.4/sq mi)

Rasiei or Rasiey is a town and an administrative district (kecamatan) in Wondama Bay Regency of West Papua province of Indonesia.

== Climate ==
Rasiei has a tropical rainforest climate (Af) with heavy rainfall year-round.

Climate data for Rasiei
Month	Jan	Feb	Mar	Apr	May	Jun	Jul	Aug	Sep	Oct	Nov	Dec	Year
Mean daily maximum °C (°F)	31.1 (88.0)	31.0 (87.8)	30.9 (87.6)	30.6 (87.1)	30.2 (86.4)	29.2 (84.6)	28.5 (83.3)	28.6 (83.5)	29.3 (84.7)	30.1 (86.2)	30.8 (87.4)	31.2 (88.2)	30.1 (86.2)
Daily mean °C (°F)	26.9 (80.4)	26.9 (80.4)	27.0 (80.6)	26.0 (78.8)	26.7 (80.1)	25.9 (78.6)	25.4 (77.7)	25.5 (77.9)	25.9 (78.6)	26.4 (79.5)	26.9 (80.4)	27.1 (80.8)	26.4 (79.5)
Mean daily minimum °C (°F)	22.8 (73.0)	22.9 (73.2)	23.1 (73.6)	23.2 (73.8)	23.2 (73.8)	22.7 (72.9)	22.4 (72.3)	22.4 (72.3)	22.6 (72.7)	22.8 (73.0)	23.1 (73.6)	23.0 (73.4)	22.9 (73.1)
Average rainfall mm (inches)	270 (10.6)	275 (10.8)	284 (11.2)	240 (9.4)	243 (9.6)	201 (7.9)	178 (7.0)	186 (7.3)	165 (6.5)	191 (7.5)	202 (8.0)	252 (9.9)	2,687 (105.7)
Source: Climate-Data.org

== Notes ==
- About Rasiei
