= Abdul Hakim Achmad Aituarauw =

Indonesian politician and King of Kaimana

Abdul Hakim Achmad Aituarauw Rat Sran Rat Kaimana Umisi VIII

King of Kaimana
- Enthroned: 1980–unknown
- Title: Rat Sran Rat Kaimana Umisi VIII
- Predecessor: Muhammad Achmad Rais Aituarauw
- Successor: Mohammad Natsir Aituarauw
- Born: Abdul Hakim Achmad Aituarauw; 31 October 1954 (age 71); Ayamaru, Dutch New Guinea (now present-day Southwest Papua province, Indonesia)
- Father: Muhammad Achmad Rais Aituarauw
- Religion: Sunni Islam

Abdul Hakim Achmad Aituarauw (given the title Rat Sran Rat Kaimana Umisi VIII; born 31 October 1954 in Ayamaru, Dutch New Guinea) was an Indonesian Papuan former legislative member of DPR West Papua (local legislature), a legislative candidate for DPR-RI West Papua (national legislature) and also the former king of Kingdom of Kaimana in West Papua, Indonesia.

== Background ==
Abdul Hakim Achmad Aituarauw was born into a Kaimana noble family. His father was Muhammad Achmad Rais Aituarauw who was the 7th officially recorded king as well as member of New Guinea Council and the leader of pro-Indonesian group of Merdeka Bersama Kaimana Irian Barat (MBKIB) during Dutch rule, through which the people boycotted the celebration of Queen Wilhelmina's birthday anniversary every 31 August. In response of this activity, Aituarauw was arrested by the Dutch and was exiled with his family to Ayamaru for 10 years from 1948. During his father's exile, Abdul Hakim was born in Ayamaru, Maybrat.

== Position ==
He is the 8th officially recorded king of the Kingdom of Kaimana.
