= Machmud Singgirei Rumagesan =

- Raja al-Alam Ugar Pik-Pik Sekar
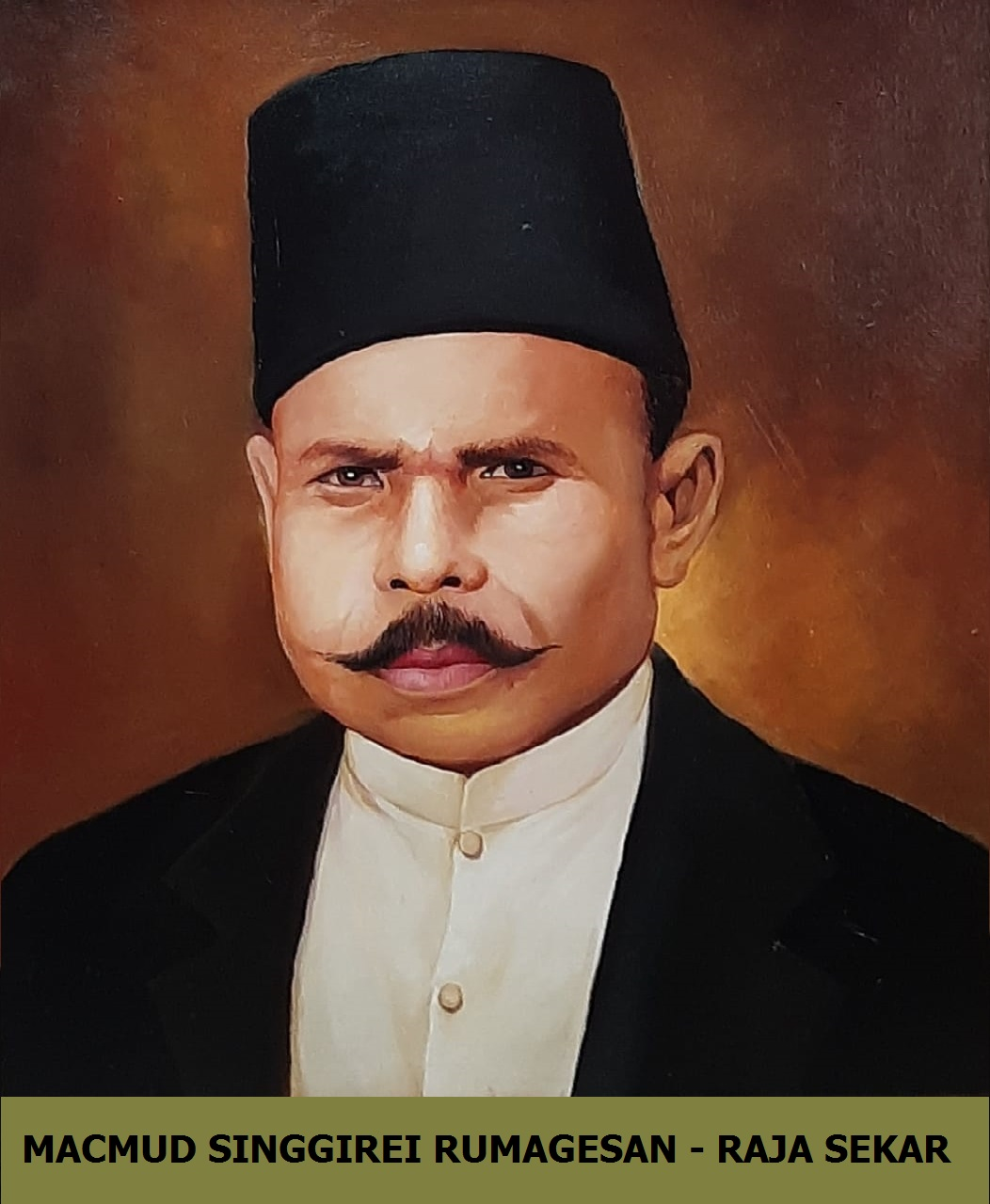
- Illustration of Machmud Singgirei Rumagesan
- Reign: 1915
- Predecessor: Raja of Kabituwar Pandai of Congan; Raja of Sekar Saban Pipi Rumagesan
- Successor: Amir Syahdan Rumagesan
- Born: 27 December 1885; Kokas, Afdeeling Fakfak
- Died: 5 July 1964 (aged 78); Jakarta, Indonesia
- Burial: Trikora Heroes' Cemetery Kokas, Fakfak Regency
- Spouse: Noen, Princess of Laha; Janiba, Princess of Gowa Sultanate
- Issue: Amir Syahdan; Amina; Hadidja; Regaija; Boke Salha; Masdjab; Ratu Petuanan Tanah Rata Kokoda, Rustuty
- House: Rumagesan
- Father: Saban Pipi Rumagesan
- Religion: Sunni Islam

Machmud Singgirei Rumagesan was a king of Sekar and pro-integration activist from West Papua. He founded the movement Gerakan Tjendrawasih Revolusioner Irian Barat (GTRIB) in 1953, and became the member of Supreme Advisory Council in 1959. On 10 November 2020, Singgirei Rumagesan was posthumously declared a National Hero of Indonesia for his lifelong efforts to unite West Irian with Indonesia.

== Early life and ascension to the throne ==
Machmud Singgirei Rumagesan was born in Kokas, Fakfak Regency, on 27 December 1885, to Saban Pipi Rumagesan. Pipi was the son of Dimin an adopted son of Paduri, commissioned raja under Rumbati. Paduri was succeeded by his son, Pandai which receive the title Raja of Kabituwar (Sekar) from Tidore Sultanate. Lacking noble bloodline, Dimin's descendant cannot take the throne according to local customary law. When Pandai died, no successor was chosen as he did not have any brothers, and his son, Abdulrachman was still a child. Hence Pipi ran the kingdom as Raja Muda without being officially enthroned. With intervention by Dutch colonial authority, Pipi became Raja of Sekar in 1911. Singgirei was crowned as Raja Muda to help with his father. After his father died in 1915 Singgirei ascended the throne to became Raja of Sekar, and officially took the title Raja Al Alam Ugar Sekar.

== Conflict with Dutch authority ==
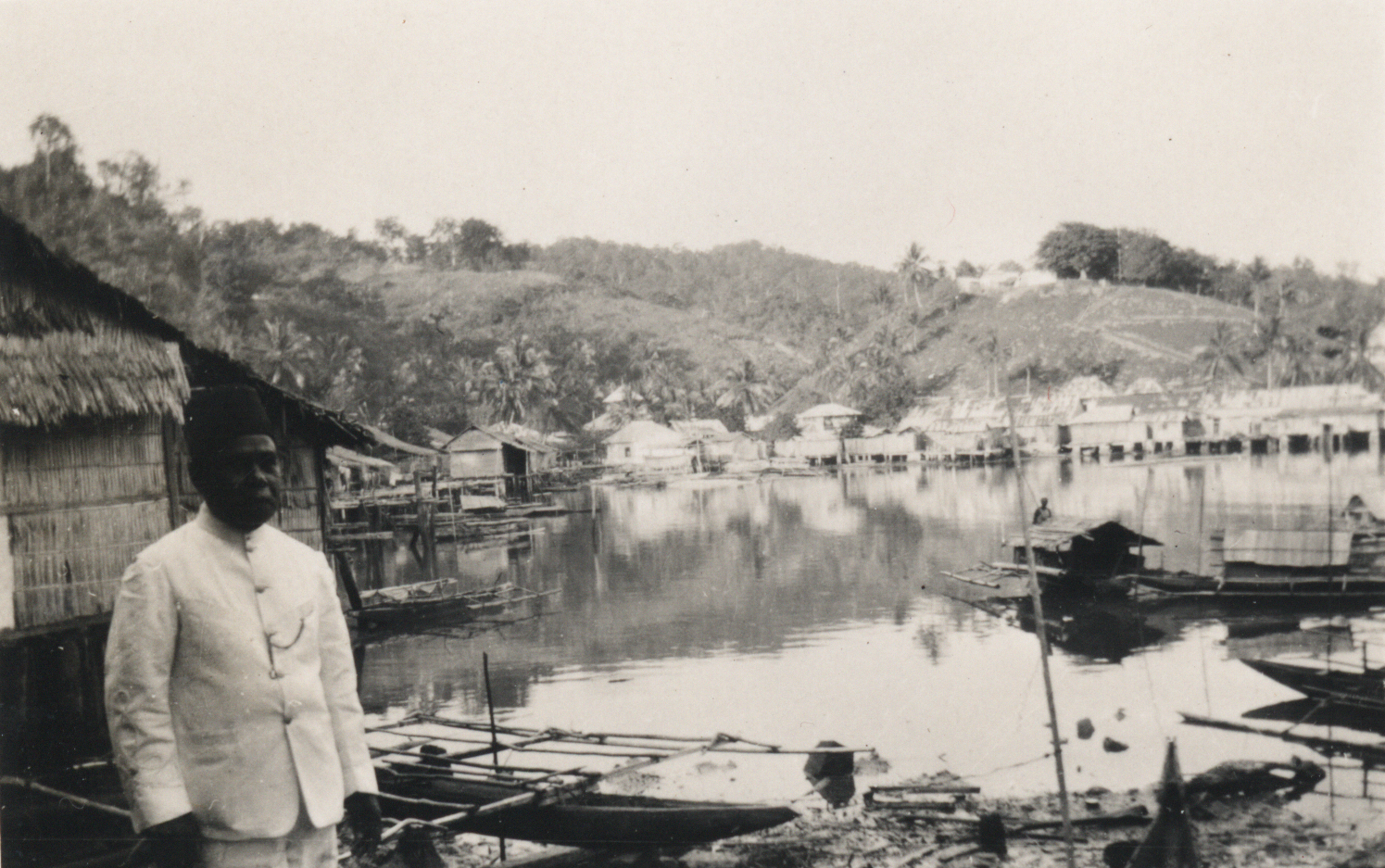
Raja Singgirei in Kokas, 1933-1936

Singgirei Rumagesan was involved in a conflict relating to Dutch oil mining company Maatschappij Colijn operating in Kokas in 1934, in which he asked them to employ local workers, give better treatment and pay. He was instrumental in setting up the operation hence the company complied and gave their wages to him to distribute, however the Bestuur Assistant requested the money, when he was rejected he reported to Controleur G. van den Terwijk. King Rumagesan and his subjects was involved in a fight with van den Terwijk and almost kill him, the conflict then became a broader rebellion. Dutch colonial authority in Fakfak found out of the incident and sent soldiers to stop the rebellion, as a result, 73 people alongside 5 village leaders were imprisoned and were sentence between 2–10 years. King Rumagesan was sentenced to 15 years in prison in Saparua, Moluccas. In prison he managed to write a letter asking for help to Mohammad Husni Thamrin a member of Volksraad at the time. Thamrin succeeded in bringing Rumagesan's case to court, Rumagesan won and was eventually freed in 1941.

During the Japanese occupation of the Dutch East Indies, King Rumagesan was given the title Minanu Tokyo and given some authority in West New Guinea. After the end of the war, he alongside other kings in Papua was ordered to re-raise the Dutch flag on 1 March 1946, which he refused and lowered the flags the next day. This ignited a fight with Dutch colonial authority, which he lost. He was later imprisoned in Doom Island, Sorong, where he managed to recruit some followers especially former local Kempei-Ho/Hei Ho as well as the support from local Sangaji Malan with Pioneers of Independence Organization, and managed to form a force armed with 40 rifles. Dutch colonial authority would found out and he was exiled to Manokwari. There he also managed to influence some Papuans and they hatched an arson plot on Dutch barracks. This plot was thwarted and Rumagesan along with his followers were moved to Abepura, Hollandia, he was sentenced to death before eventually moved to Makassar in 1949 and before eventually Nusa Kambangan. However he was freed from prison on 2 May 1950 under the authority of RIS court.

On 24 June 1950, Rumagesan was ushered by Albert Karubuy to visit Sukarno, in a meeting where he was disappointed that since 1950 Sukarno's speeches were only heard from "Sabang to Dobo" instead of "Sabang to Merauke", quoting Sukarno's speeches and the phrase would be popularised later on, he accepted the resolution of Round Table Conference that Irian matters should be solved after one year but instead have passed two and a half years, and would support republican government. On 26 January 1951, his daughter Boke Salha gave a public speech in Balikpapan in support of Irian becoming part of Indonesia and about her dad's experience fighting the Dutch in 1936. In 1953, he founded the movement Gerakan Tjendrawasih Revolusioner Irian Barat (GTRIB) and with Abbas Iha, Gerakan Organisasi Pemuda Cendrawasih Muda. He alongside King of Rumbati, Ibrahim Bauw, who founded the movement New Guinea Islamic Union (KING), advocated for Jihad Fisabilillah in Papuan mosques against Netherlands. In the same year there was a revolt in Fakfak Regency under the leadership of Abutalib bin Paris from Kokas.

Since 1950, He alongside N.L. Suwages had represented West Irian as member of a body called Supreme Advisory Council, it was restructured to be National Council in 1957, before it was returned to its previous structure in 1959. During this time he would accommodate J.A. Dimara in his house as Dimara recovered in Jakarta after invasion against RMS. He coordinated closely with President cabinet efforts on Irian in 1954, including his approved request of the formation of "Rumagessan Battalion" specially for Irian under T&T VII/Wirabuana in preparation for infiltration into New Guinea, the formation of Irian Bureau predecessor of Papua governorship and decision on its leadership board, although some of his suggestions would be rejected.

Front Nasional Pembebasan Irian Barat (FNPIB) was formed on 31 December 1959 to unite national effort on West Irian issues, Operation A under Col. Magenda would be to train Papuans volunteers for infiltration to West New Guinea from North Moluccas, Operation B would be focused on Papuan educations, and Operation C would be run by Uyeng Suwargana tasked with approaching groups in Netherlands to change its position. On 13–15 April 1961 there was a Cibogo Conference, Bogor, which was organized by Papuan exiles in Indonesia, whose goal was to organized joint civilian-military efforts on West Irian and to match efforts by New Guinea Council. Notable participants include Rumagesan, Suwages, Silas Papare, Sugoro Atmoprasojo, Abdul Haris Nasution, and member DPRGR of West Irian, Adrianus Leonard Marani. By December 1961 Depertan was formed a body which would form West Irian High Command (KOTI), and eventually the Trikora declaration by Sukarno on 19 December 1961.

As the leader of GTRIB he was given honorary certification from Kodam VII/Wirabuana Resimen Infanteri-25 and from chief of staff of Indonesian Army.

== Personal life ==
When Singgirei visited Sulawesi with Sukarno in 1950s, he was welcomed by local dancers. One of those dancers was Janiba, a 17 year old princess from the Gowa Sultanate. He would marry her and she would gave birth to Rustuty Rumagesan. Singgirei was succeeded by his son, after he died, there was a conflict of succession, hence Rustuty was asked to become the king. She rejected the Raja title and instead style herself as "Ratu Petuanan Tanah Rata Kokoda". After she died, PYM. Arief Rumagesan, fifth grandchild of Singgirei, succeeded her as "Raja Petuanan Pikpik Sekar".
