= West Papua (province) =

Province in Western New Guinea, Indonesia

West Papua Papua Barat West Irian
- Province with special status
- Province of West Papua; Provinsi Papua Barat
- Coat of arms
- Motto: Cintaku Negeriku (My love, my country)
- West Papua in Indonesia
- Interactive map of West Papua
- Coordinates (Manokwari): 0°52′S 134°5′E
- Country: Indonesia
- Region: Western New Guinea (Eastern Indonesia)
- Founded: 21 November 2001
- Capital and largest city: Manokwari

Government
  - Body: West Papua Provincial Government; West Papua People's Assembly (MRPB) (customs)
  - Governor: Dominggus Mandacan (NasDem)
  - Vice Governor: Mohamad Lakotani
  - Legislature: West Papua House of Representatives(DPRPB)

Area
  - Total: 60,275.33 km^{2} (23,272.44 sq mi)
  - Rank: 5th
- Highest elevation (Mount Arfak): 2,955 m (9,695 ft)

Population (mid 2025 estimate)
  - Total: 587,645
  - Density: 9.74935/km^{2} (25.2507/sq mi)

Demographics
  - Ethnic groups: 57.26% West Papuan tribes and others.
  - Religion: 62.9% Christianity —54.2% Protestantism —8.7% Catholicism; 36.7% Islam; 0.19% Hinduism; 0.19% Buddhism
  - Languages: Indonesian; Papuan Malay (lingua franca) and various local languages
- Time zone: UTC+09:00 (Indonesia Eastern Time)
- HDI (2024): ▲0.677 (36th) – (Medium)
- Website: papuabaratprov.go.id

West Papua (Indonesian: Papua Barat), formerly Irian Jaya Barat (West Irian), is an Indonesian province located in Indonesian Papua. It covers most of the two western peninsulas of the island of New Guinea: the eastern half of the Bird's Head Peninsula (or Doberai Peninsula) and the whole of the Bomberai Peninsula, along with nearby smaller islands. The province is bordered to the north by the Pacific Ocean; to the west by Southwest Papua Province, the Halmahera Sea and the Ceram Sea; to the south by the Banda Sea; and to the east by the province of Central Papua and the Cenderawasih Bay. Manokwari is the province's capital and largest city. With an estimated population of 587,645 in mid-2025 (comprising 308,424 males and 279,221 females), West Papua is the second-least-populous province in Indonesia after South Papua, following the separation off in December 2022 of the western half of the Bird's Head Peninsula to create the new province of Southwest Papua, containing 52% of what had been West Papua's population. Its population density is similar to that of Russia.

After the Japanese surrender in 1945, the Dutch remained in New Guinea until 1962 when they transferred the control of the region to the Indonesian government as a part of the New York Agreement. West Papua was legally created as a province in 1999 (out of the original Papua Province), but it was not inaugurated until 2003. Consisting until 2022 of twelve regencies and one city, the province has a special autonomous status as granted by Indonesian legislation.

West Papua has a medium Human Development Index. The Indonesian government has launched the building of ambitious infrastructure projects including the Trans-Papua Highway, airports, and other facilities. Detractors claim that these projects threaten Southeast Asia's and Oceania's last large regions of tropical rainforests and native cultures. According to Bank Indonesia, West Papua recorded an economic growth rate of 7.7% during 2018, which is higher than the national economic growth.

== History ==
=== Etymology ===
There are several theories regarding the origin of the word Papua. One theory is that the name comes from the word 'Papo-Ua', named by the Tidore Sultanate, which in the Tidore language means "not joining" or "not being united", meaning that the island had no king. Before the age of colonization, the Tidore Sultanate controlled some parts of the Bird's Head Peninsula in what is now the province of Southwest Papua before expanding to also include coastal regions in the current province of Papua. This relationship played an important historical role in binding Indonesia to the Papua. Another theory is that the word Papua comes from the Malay word 'papuwah', which means 'frizzled hair'. It was first mentioned in 1812 Malay Dictionary by William Marsden, although it was not found on earlier dictionaries. In the records of 16th century Portuguese and Spanish sailors, the word 'Papua' is the designation for the inhabitants who inhabit the Raja Ampat Islands and the coastal parts of the Bird's Head Peninsula.

The former name of the province, Irian Jaya, was suggested during a tribal committee meeting in Tobati, Jayapura, formed by Atmoprasojo, head of bestuur school in the 1940s, Frans Kaisiepo the committee leader suggested name from Mansren Koreri myths, Iri-an from the Biak language of Biak Island, meaning "hot land" referring to the local climate, but also from Iryan which means heated process as a metaphor for a land that is entering a new era. In Serui Iri-an (lit. 'land-nation') means "pillar of nation", while in Merauke Iri-an (lit. 'placed higher-nation') means "rising spirit" or "to rise". The name was promoted in 1945 by Marcus Kaisiepo, brother of the future governor Frans Kaisiepo. The name Irian was politicized later by Marthen Indey and Silas Papare with the Indonesian acronym 'Ikut Republik Indonesia Anti Nederland' (Join the Republic of Indonesia oppose the Netherlands). The name was used throughout the Suharto administration, until it was changed to Papua during the administration of President Abdurrahman Wahid.

The Dutch, who arrived later under Jacob Le Maire and Willem Schouten, called it Schouten island. They later used this name only to refer to islands off the north coast of Papua proper, the Schouten Islands or Biak. When the Dutch colonized this island as part of the Dutch East Indies, they called it Nieuw Guinea.

Speakers align themselves with a political orientation when choosing a name for the western half of the island of New Guinea. The official name of the region is "Papua" according to International Organization for Standardization (ISO). Independence activists refer to the region as "West Papua", while Indonesian officials have also used "West Papua" to name the westernmost province of the region since 2007. Historically, the region has had the official names of Netherlands New Guinea (1895–1962), West Irian or Irian Barat (1962–73), Irian Jaya (1973–2002), Irian Jaya Barat (2003–2007), and Papua Barat (2007–present).

=== Pre-colonial era ===
Papuan habitation of the region is estimated to have begun over 50,000 years ago. Research indicates that the highlands were an early and independent centre of agriculture, and show that agriculture developed gradually over several thousands of years; the banana has been cultivated in this region for at least 7,000 years. Austronesian peoples migrating through Maritime Southeast Asia settled in the area at least 3,000 years ago, and populated especially in Cenderawasih Bay. Diverse cultures and languages have developed in the island due to geographical isolation; there are over 300 languages and two hundred additional dialects in the region (see Papuan languages, Austronesian languages, Central–Eastern Malayo-Polynesian languages).

Chinese referred to it as Tungki, the area where they obtained spices. Meanwhile, in the latter half of 600 AD, the Sumatra-based empire of Srivijaya (7th century–13th century) referred to the island as Janggi. The empire engaged in trade relations with western New Guinea, initially taking items like sandalwood and birds-of-paradise in tribute to China, but later making slaves out of the natives. It was only at the beginning of 700 AD that traders from Persia and Gujarat began to arrive in what is now Papua and call it Dwi Panta or Samudrananta, which means 'at edge of the ocean'.

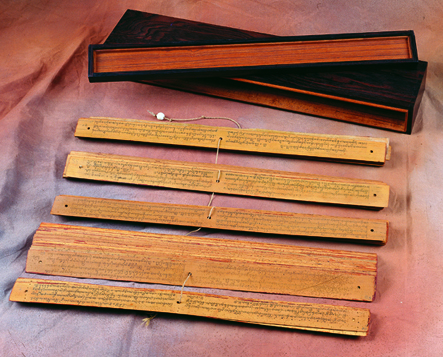
The Nagarakertagama mentioned a region in the east called Wanin, present-day Onin Peninsula in the Fakfak Regency, West Papua.

The 14th-century Majapahit poem Nagarakretagama mentioned Wwanin or Onin and Sran as a recognized territory in the east, today identified as Onin peninsula in Fakfak Regency in the western part of the larger Bomberai Peninsula south of the Bird's Head region of Western New Guinea. At that time, Papua was said to be the eighth region of the Majapahit Empire. Wanin or Onin was probably the oldest name in recorded history to refer to the western part of the island of New Guinea. A transcript from the Nagarakretagama says the following:

Ikang sakasanusasanusa Makasar Butun Banggawai Kuni Ggaliyao mwang i [ng] Salaya Sumba Solot Muar muwah tigang i Wandan Ambwan Athawa maloko Ewanin ri Sran ini Timur ning angeka nusatutur.

According to some linguists, the word Ewanin is another name for Onin, while Sran popularly misunderstood to refers to Seram Island in Maluku, is more likely another name for Kowiai. The local Papuan kingdom in its native language is called Sran Eman Muun which is based in Kaimana and its furthest influence extends to the Kei Islands, in southeastern Maluku. In his book Nieuw Guinea, Dutch author WC. Klein explained the beginning of the influence of the Bacan Sultanate in Papua. There he wrote: In 1569 Papoese hoof den bezoeken Batjan. Ee aanterijken worden vermeld (In 1569, Papuan tribal leaders visited Bacan, which resulted in the creation of new kingdoms). According to the oral history of the Biak people, there used to be a relationship and marriage between their tribal chiefs and the sultans of Tidore. The Biak people is the largest Melanesian tribe that spreads on the northern coast of Papua, therefore the Biak language is also the most widely used and considered the language of Papuan unity. Due to the relationship of the coastal areas of Papua with the Sultans of Maluku, there are several local kingdoms on this island, which shows the entry of the system of feudalism that does not originated from Papua itself.

Since the 16th century, apart from the Raja Ampat Islands which was contested between the Bacan Sultanate, Tidore Sultanate, and Ternate Sultanate, other coastal areas of Papua from the island of Biak to Mimika have become a vassal of the Tidore Sultanate. The Tidore Sultanate adheres to the trade pact and custom of Uli-Siwa ( federation of nine ), so there were nine trade partners led by Tidore in opposition to Ternate-led Uli Lima ( federation of five ). In administering its regions in Papua, Tidore divide them to three regions, Korano Ngaruha ( lit. 'Four Kings' ) or Raja Ampat Islands, Papoua Gam Sio ( lit. 'Papua The Nine Negeri') and Mafor Soa Raha ( lit. 'Mafor The Four Soa'). The role of these kingdoms began to decline due to the entry of traders from Europe to the archipelago which marks the beginning of colonialism in the Indonesian Archipelago. During Tidore's rule, the main exports of the island during this period were resins, spices, slaves and the highly priced feathers of the bird-of-paradise. Sultan Nuku, one of the most famous Tidore sultans who rebelled against Dutch colonization, called himself "Sultan of Tidore and Papua", during his revolt in 1780s. He commanded loyalty from both Moluccan and Papuan chiefs, especially those of Raja Ampat Islands. Following Tidore's defeat, much of the territory it claimed in western part of New Guinea came under Dutch rule as part of Dutch East Indies.

=== Colonial era ===
In 1511, Antonio d'Arbau, a Portuguese sailor, called the Papua region as "Os Papuas" or Ilha de Papo. Don Jorge de Menetes, a sailor from Spain also stopped by in Papua a few years later (1526–1527), he refers to the region as 'Papua', which was mentioned in the diary of Antonio Pigafetta, the clerk for the Magellan voyage. The name Papua was known to Pigafetta when he stopped on the island of Tidore.

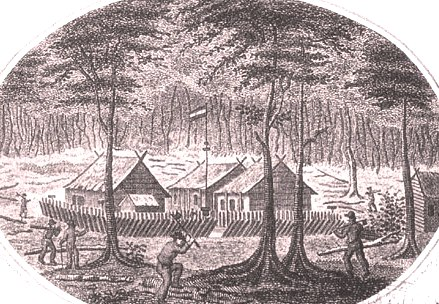
Fort Du Bus, one of the first Dutch administrative and trading posts in New Guinea

On 16 May 1545, Yñigo Ortiz de Retez, a Spanish maritime explorer who in command of the San Juan de Letran, left port in Tidore, an island which was Spain's stronghold in the Maluku Islands and going by way of the Talaud Islands and the Schoutens, reached the northern coast of New Guinea, which was coasted till the end of August when, having got to the 5°S latitude, contrary winds and currents forced a return to Tidore where he arrived on 5 October 1545. Many islands were encountered and first charted, along the northern coast of New Guinea, and in the Padaidos, Le Maires, Ninigos, Kaniets and Hermits, to some of which Spanish names were given. On 20 June 1545 at the mouth of the Mamberamo River (that was charted as San Agustin) he took possession of the land for the Spanish Crown, in the process giving the island the name by which it is known today. He called it Nueva Guinea owing to the resemblance of the local inhabitants to the peoples of the Guinea coast in West Africa. The first map showing the whole island (as an island) was published in 1600 and shown 1606, Luís Vaz de Torres explored the southern coast of New Guinea from Milne Bay to the Gulf of Papua including Orangerie Bay, which he named Bahía de San Lorenzo. His expedition also discovered Basilaki Island, naming it Tierra de San Buenaventura, which he claimed for Spain in July 1606. On 18 October, his expedition reached the western part of the island in present-day Indonesia, and also claimed the territory for the King of Spain.

In 1606, a Duyfken expedition led by the commander Wiliam Jansen from Holland landed in Papua. This expedition consisted of 3 ships, where they sailed from the north coast of Java and stopped at the Kei Islands, at the southwestern coast of Papua. With the increasing Dutch grip in the region, the Spanish left New Guinea in 1663. In 1660, the Dutch recognized the Sultan of Tidore's sovereignty over New Guinea. New Guinea thus became notionally Dutch as the Dutch held power over Tidore.

Dutch New Guinea in the early 19th century was administered from the Moluccas. Although the coast had been mapped in 1825 by Lieutenant Commander D.H. Kolff, there had been no serious effort to establish a permanent presence in Dutch New Guinea. The British, however, had shown considerable interest in the area, and were threatening to settle it. To prevent this, the Governor of the Moluccas, Pieter Merkus, urged the Dutch government to establish posts along the coast. An administrative and trading post established in 1828 on Triton Bay on the southwest coast of New Guinea. The post was named Fort Du Bus for the then-Governor General of the Dutch East Indies, Leonard du Bus de Gisignies. On 24 August 1828, the birthday of King William I of the Netherlands, the Dutch flag was hoisted and Dutch claimed all of western Papua, which they called Nieuw Guinea. In the ceremony, multiple tribes and kingdoms of the region was invited. The Dutch reorganized VOC vassalization system of Tidore Sultanate with the Sultan being given new rattan baton with gold head (formerly having VOC stamp). Under him, Sendawan (King of Namatota), Kassa (King of Lahakia) and Lutu ("Orang Kaya" from Lobo and Mawara) were recognized as leader of the regions which was symbolized by three rattan batons with silver head. Under those three, The Netherlands also recognized another twenty eight tribes or vassal kingdoms. Almost 30 years later, Germans established the first missionary settlement on an island near Manokwari. While in 1828 the Dutch claimed the south coast west of the 141st meridian and the north coast west of Humboldt Bay in 1848, they did not try to develop the region again until 1896; they established settlements in Manokwari and Fak-Fak in response to perceived Australian ownership claims from the eastern half of New Guinea.

Under Tidore hegemony around Onin Peninsula, there was three main local kingdoms Atiati, Fatagar, and Rumbati led by Bauw dynasty. In 1878, there was a war between Rumbati on one side and Fatagar and Atiati on the other side. Atiati and Fatagar moved their capitals to Ega islands. After some time there was a conflict between Atiati and Fatagar, as a result Atiati moved its capital to the mainland on the coast just across Ega island which come to be known as Atiati in modern time. Meanwhile, Fatagar moved its capital to a place called Merapi, located on the eastern side of Fakfak town in modern time.

Great Britain and Germany had recognized the Dutch claims in treaties of 1885 and 1895. At much the same time, Britain claimed south-east New Guinea, later known as the Territory of Papua, and Germany claimed the northeast, later known as the Territory of New Guinea. The German, Dutch and British colonial administrators each attempted to suppress the still-widespread practices of inter-village warfare and headhunting within their respective territories. In 1901, the Netherlands formally purchased West New Guinea from the Sultanate of Tidore, incorporating it into the Netherlands East Indies.

Other local kingdoms around the area were formerly under the dominion of Rumbati kingdom but achieved kingdom status when the Netherlands achieved hegemony of the area in 1898, this includes: Patipi kingdom centered in Patipi Bay in Fakfak, Sekar kingdom in Kokas led by Rumagesan dynasty, Wertuar kingdom centered in Sisir led by Heremba dynasty, Arguni kingdom centered in Arguni islands in Kaimana. Other kingdoms in the area include Namatota Kingdom, and Sran Kingdom.

=== Modern era ===
During the Indonesian National Awakening period, several Indonesian nationalists were interned in the Boven-Digoel detention camp in modern-day Papua province, mostly from the failed 1926 communist uprising. This began the long interaction and formation of local Indonesian nationalist movement in Western New Guinea. Following its independence declaration from the Netherlands in 1945, Indonesia claimed all of the territory of the former Dutch East Indies, including Western New Guinea. Local figures like Silas Papare created PKII in 1946 centered in Serui to begin preparation for revolution war against the Netherlands. To counter this, Netherlands formed the Papuan Council.

In 1947 Malino Conference the formation of United States of Indonesia was considered, but because of pressure from local Dutch politicians hoping to create a West New Guinea country for fleeing Indo-Eurasians, they decided against including West New Guinea in United States of Indonesia. This is contrary to the local Papuan delegates in the event, Frans Kaisiepo, who argued for the inclusion of West Papua with Indonesia. The name Irian was first suggested in a tribal committee meeting in Tobati, Jayapura, formed by Atmoprasojo, head of the Papuan (later renamed Irian) bestuur school, and Kaisiepo was the committee leader, but this was the first time the name 'Irian' was popularised outside of New Guinea to describe the territory.

Kaisiepo later rejected to becoming Dutch New Guinea representatives during 1949 Round-Table Conference, which resulted in no Papuan representatives in the conference. The result of which was United States of Indonesia independence and postponement of the Western new Guinea status negotiation to the next year.

However, by 1950s Republic of Indonesia Government dissolved United States of Indonesia, with many of the constituent merging to form United Republic of Indonesia. This angered the Dutch, because it destroyed their influence in many of the formed republics constituent of BFO and the dissolving of Dutch-Indonesian Union. As a result, the region was still retained by the Dutch, which caused increasing tension of Netherlands with Indonesia.

By December 1957, Sukarno frustrated with the lack of progress for Western New Guinea negotiation, decided to nationalise around 246 Dutch companies dominating Indonesian economy. By early 1960s Indonesia also began to accept increasing amounts of Soviet-bloc military aid. This led to increasingly aggressive stance by Indonesia. In April 1961, Netherlands announced the formation of a Nieuw Guinea Raad, intending to create an independent Papuan state. During a speech in Yogyakarta on 19 December 1961, Indonesia declared intention of military confrontation by Formation of Tri Komando Rakjat (TRIKORA). Indonesia then began to direct military incursions into the half-island, which was referred to as West Irian. By the end of 1962, 3,000 Indonesian soldiers were present throughout West Irian/West Papua. Although most of these military incursion managed to make contact with local Indonesian nationalists, most were unsuccessful in taking control and were captured by Dutch authority.

Fearing more Indonesian shift toward the Soviet bloc, United States formulated a plan to resolve the Western New Guinea dispute. Indonesian delegation included several Indonesian nationalists from West Papua who managed to make contact during earlier incursions, such as Marthen Indey and Silas Papare. It was agreed through the New York Agreement in 1962, that the administration of Western New Guinea would be temporarily transferred from the Netherlands to Indonesia and that by 1969 the United Nations should oversee a referendum of the Papuan people, in which they would be given two options: to remain part of Indonesia or to become an independent nation. This vote was referred to as the Act of Free Choice. However, the vote was reportedly conducted by consensus of government-selected delegates, numbering slightly over 1,000, which represented the elite of Papuan society, mostly Papuan tribal elders and local kings, such as Machmud Singgirei Rumagesan, kings of Sekar, and the few local Papuans lucky to receive education during the earlier period of Dutch East Indies. (Note: Different sources cite various figures, including 1,022, 1,025 or 1,026.) The referendum was recognised by the international community and the region became the Indonesian province of Irian Jaya (renamed Papua in 1999). The result of the compromised vote was rejected by West Papuan nationalists, who are descendants of the Dutch New Guinea educated elites, who established the Free Papua Movement (OPM) which have roots in the earlier Dutch-formed Papuan Council. The independence movement for West Papua has continued, primarily through peaceful protest and international pressure, but also guerrilla warfare against the Indonesian administration.

The Papua conflict is an ongoing conflict in Western New Guinea between Indonesia and the Free Papua Movement (Indonesian: Organisasi Papua Merdeka, OPM). Subsequent to the withdrawal of the Dutch administration from the Netherlands New Guinea in 1962 and implementation of Indonesian administration in 1963, the Free Papua Movement has conducted a low-intensity guerrilla war against Indonesia, through the targeting of its military, police, and civilian populations.

The province of West Papua was established out of the western portion of the province of Papua in February 2003, initially under the name of West Irian Jaya (Irian Jaya Barat). In November 2004, an Indonesian court agreed that the split violated Papua's autonomy laws. However, the court ruled that because the new province had already been established, it should remain separate from Papua. The ruling also prohibited the creation of another proposed province, Central Irian Jaya, as that division had not yet been formalised. The split is in line with the general trend of provincial splits that is occurring in all parts of Indonesia in the post-Suharto era.

The name of the province was changed to Papua Barat in 2007. The new name applies from that date, but a plenary session of the provincial legislative council is required to legalise the change of name, and the government needed to issue an implementing regulation. Since April 18, 2007 the government has issued the implementing regulation.

In November 2022, Sorong City and West Papua's westernmost regencies were separated off and formed into the new province of Southwest Papua, so named despite their location on the northwestern part of the island.

== Geography ==
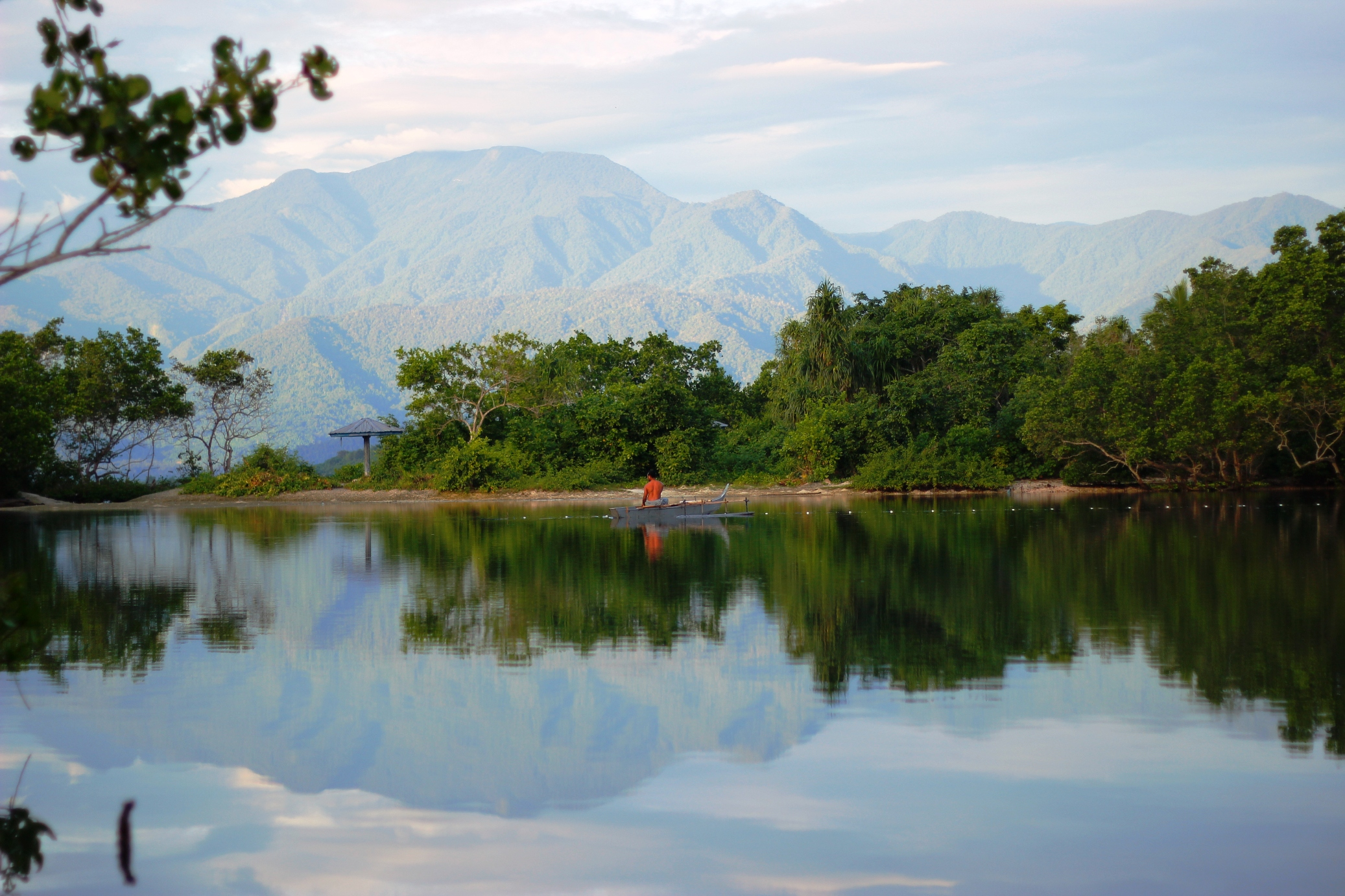
Arfak Mountains, the highest point in West Papua, can be seen from a pond near the Rendani Airport, Manokwari.

The provincial area now includes the eastern part of the Doberai Peninsula (Bird's Head Peninsula) and the whole of the Bomberai Peninsula to the south. In the north, the province is bordered by the Pacific Ocean, in the west by Southwest Papua, North Maluku province and Maluku province, in the east by Cenderawasih Bay, in the south by the Ceram Sea and in the southeast by Central Papua Province. The southeastern boundary of West Papua is almost the same as the Afdeling boundary ("part") West Nieuw-Guinea ("West New Guinea") in the Dutch East Indies. Since the creation of the new Southwest Papua Province, the residual West Papua Province consists of only seven regencies.

West Papua is located between 0–4 degrees South Latitude and 124–132 degrees East Longitude, just below the equator with an altitude of 0–100 m (0–328 ft) above sea level. The area of West Papua before the creation of Southwest Papua Province was 99,398.26 km^{2} (38,377.88 sq mi), and is currently about 60,275.33 km^{2} (23,272.44 sq mi).

The climate in West Papua also tends to be the same as the climate in the Papua Province, which is tropical with rainfall varying in each region.

The land condition in West Papua is almost the same as the Papua Province where the surface is in the form of cliffs and slopes. The types of soil in West Papua are latosol, resina, red and yellow medeteren, podsol, red yellow podsolic, gray red podsolic, litosol, alluvia, gray hydromorph.

The mountains in West Papua include the Arfak Mountains (2,940 m (9,646 ft)) in Arfak Mountains Regency, the Fak-Fak Mountains in Fak-Fak Regency, Mount Fudi (1,280 m (4,199 ft)) in Fak-Fak Regency, Kumafa Mountains in Fak-Fak Regency, Mount Togwomeri (2,680 m (8,793 ft)) in Manokwari Regency, Mount Wasada (1,070 m (3,510 ft)) in Manokwari Regency, Mount Wiwi (1,130 m (3,707 ft)) in Manokwari Regency.

Lakes in West Papua include Anggi Giji Lake in Manokwari Regency, Anggi Gita Lake in Manokwari Regency, Lake Yamur in Manokwari Regency.

The province is rich in karst areas. Many of these areas remain unexplored from a speleological point of view. Among the most important caves explored, there are the Lomo Longmot (360 metres deep) and Lomo Iono Besar (315 metres deep), respectively the second and fourth caves for depth in Indonesia. These caves were explored in the 1990s by a French speleology expedition team in the Lina Mountains region, Irameba Village, Anggi District, Manokwari Regency. Recently the karst system of the Aouk-Kladuk river has been explored. At present, it is the largest underground river explored on the planet.

Marine conservation work in the province has included the Terumbu Karang Sehat Indonesia programme implemented by Konservasi Indonesia in parts of the Bird's Head Seascape.

== Government and administrative divisions ==
Regencies of West Papua Province

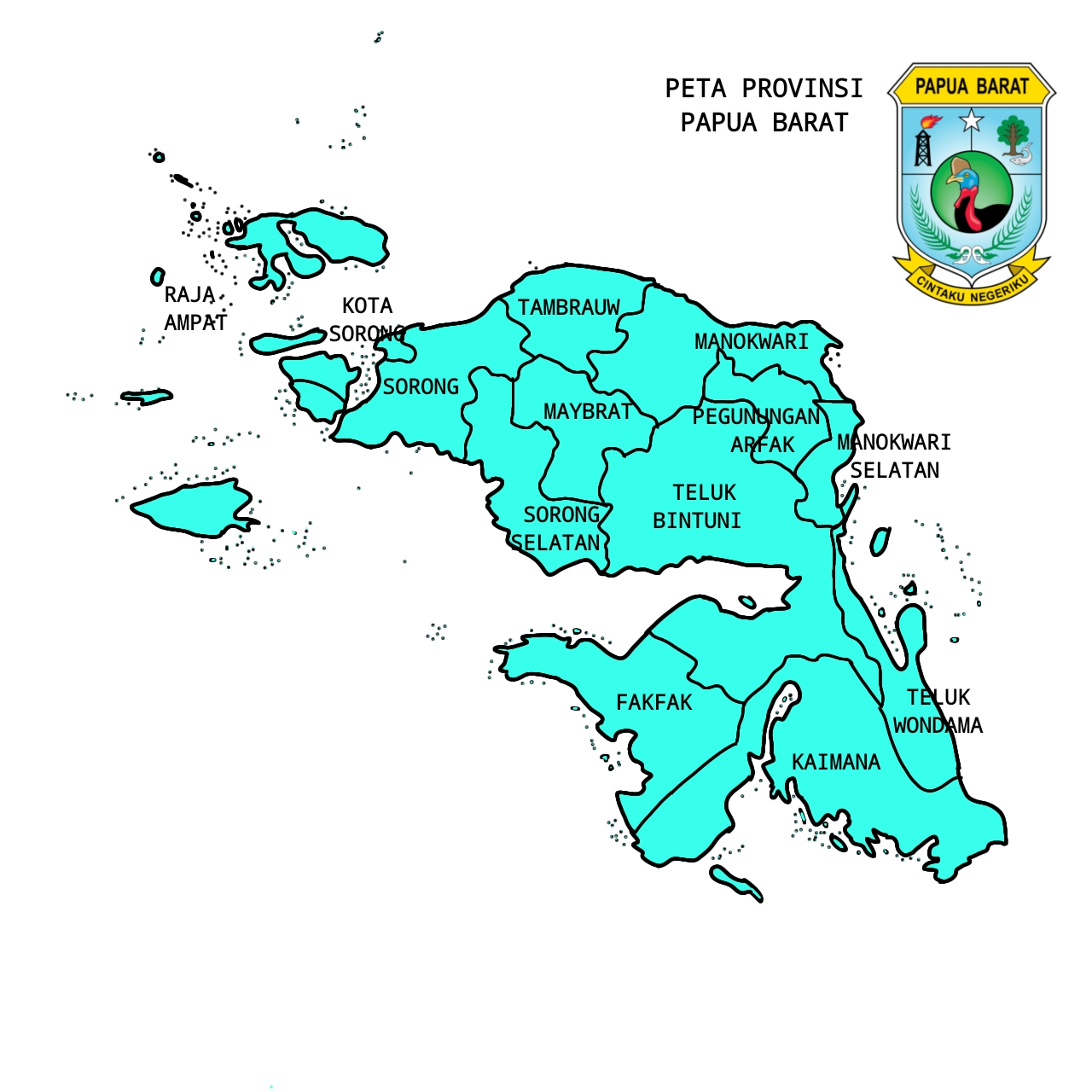
Administrative map of West Papua Province as of 2013, before Southwest Papua Province was split off in 2022

Before 1999, the areas forming (since 2003) West Papua Province consisted of three regencies (kabupaten) – Manokwari, Sorong and Fakfak. The City of Sorong was separated from Sorong Regency on 4 October 1999 and established as a regency-level administration. Five new regencies were created on 11 December 2002 – Kaimara from part of Fakfak Regency, Raja Ampat (the Raja Ampat Islands off the west coast of Papua) and South Sorong (Sorong Selatan) from further parts of Sorong Regency, and Teluk Bintuni and Teluk Wondama from parts of Manokwari Regency. In late 2008 two new regencies were created from other arts of Sorong Regency – Tambrauw on 29 October, and Maybrat on 19 December. Thus by 2009 the province was administratively divided into ten regencies (kabupaten) and the autonomous city (kota), which together were subdivided into 155 districts (distrik) at the 2010 Census. Two further new regencies were created on 25 October 2012 – South Manokwari (Manokwari Selatan) and Arfak Mountains (Pegunungan Arfak) – both from districts which were formerly parts of the Manokwari Regency, while four further districts of Manokwari Regency were added to Tambrauw Regency. However, as mentioned above, the province was split in two in late 2022, with the eastern part (containing just 48% of the existing population) retaining the name of West Papua.

All the existing regencies in the reduced province are listed below with their areas and their populations at the 2010 Census and the 2020 Census, together with the official estimates as at mid 2025.

Kode Wilayah	Name of Regency (kabupaten)	Area in km^{2}	Pop'n Census 2010	Pop'n Census 2020	Pop'n Estimate mid 2025	Capital	No. of Districts	No. of Villages	HDI 2023 estimate
92.03	Fakfak Regency	9,736.55	66,828	85,197	91,441	Fakfak	17	149	0.697 (Medium)
92.08	Kaimana Regency	17,849.22	46,249	62,256	67,795	Kaimana	7	86	0.667 (Medium)
92.07	Teluk Wondama Regency (Wondama Bay)	4,847.34	26,321	41,644	46,595	Rasiei	13	76	0.617 (Medium)
92.06	Teluk Bintuni Regency (Bintuni Bay)	19,943.29	52,422	87,083	92,009	Bintuni	24	117	0.660 (Medium)
92.02	Manokwari Regency	2,763.02	145,285	192,663	208,021	Manokwari	9	173	0.732 (High)
92.11	Manokwari Selatan Regency (South Manokwari)	1,837.10	18,564	35,949	39,571	Boundij-Ransiki	6	57	0.616 (Medium)
92.12	Pegunungan Arfak Regency (Arfak Mountains)	3,298.81	23,877	38,207	42,213	Anggi	10	166	0.578 (Medium)
	Totals	60,275.33	379,546	542,999	587,645	Manokwari	86	824	

On 25 October 2013 the People's Representative Council began reviewing draft laws on the establishment of 57 prospective regencies and cities (and 8 new provinces). This included a new province of Southwest Papua to be created out of the existing West Papua province, together with three new regencies and one city to be formed within the residual West Papua Province – Moskona (from Teluk Bintuni Regency), Kokas (from Fakfak Regency), and West Manokwari (from Manokwari Regency), while the new city is Manokwari (from Manokwari Regency). Except for the creation of the new province of Southwest Papua in late 2022, these projected changes have not yet (by 2024) been implemented.

The province now forms one of Indonesia's 84 national electoral districts to elect members to the People's Representative Council. The West Papua Electoral District consists of all of the 7 regencies in the province, and elects 3 members to the People's Representative Council.

== Economy ==
This province has tremendous potential, both agriculture, mining, forest products and tourism. Pearls and seaweed are produced in Raja Ampat Regency while the only traditional weaving industry called Timor fabric is produced in South Sorong Regency. Fragrant nutmeg syrup can be obtained in Fak-Fak Regency as well as various other potentials. Besides that, nature tourism is also one of the mainstays of West Papua, such as the Cenderawasih Bay National Park located in Teluk Wondama Regency. This National Park stretches from the east of the Kwatisore Peninsula to the north of Rumberpon Island with a coastline of 500 km, the land area reaches 68,200 ha, sea area 1,385,300 ha with details of 80,000 ha of coral reefs and 12,400 ha of ocean.

== Demographics ==
Historical population
Year	Pop.	±%
1971	192,146	—
1980	283,493	+47.5%
1990	385,509	+36.0%
2000	571,107	+48.1%
2005	643,012	+12.6%
2010	760,422	+18.3%
2015	868,819	+14.3%
2020	1,134,068	+30.5%
2021	1,156,840	+2.0%
2022	1,183,307	+2.3%
2025	587,645	−50.3%
Source: Statistics Indonesia 2026 and earlier versions. West Papua was part of Papua Province until 2001, but the pre-2002 figures reflect the area split off in 2001. The last figure for 2025 takes account of the division into 2 provinces that took place in December 2022.

=== Ethnic groups ===
57.26% of the total population in West Papua are the native Papuan people. There are several tribes that inhabit West Papua Province, which are Arfak (Hatam, Meyah, Moire, and Sougb), Borai, Numfor Doreri, Irarutu, Koiwai, Kuri, Madewana, Mairasi, Maniwak, Mbaham-Matta, Miere, Moru, Moskona, Napiti, Oburauw, Roon, Roswar, Sebyar (Damban and Kemberan), Soviar, Sumuri, Wamesa, Warumba, Waruri, Wondama.

In general, when viewed from the perspective of cultural characteristics, livelihoods, and patterns of life, indigenous Papuans in West Papua can be divided into two major groups: highlander (inland or mountainous) Papuans, which are non-Austronesian, and coastal Papuans, which are Austronesian (italicized above). Though centuries of interaction have caused both groups to have mixed and influenced each other.

The remaining population is mostly migrants from other parts of Indonesia, with the largest group of migrants from Sulawesi, such as Buginese, Makassarese, Minahasan, Torajan, Butonese, followed by Javanese, and Moluccans.The Indonesian government has forced the displacement of many indigneous people in this region.

=== Religion ===
Religion in West Papua (2022)
1. Protestantism (53.3%)
2. Islam (38.1%)
3. Catholicism (8.40%)
4. Hinduism (0.10%)
5. Buddhism (0.05%)
6. Confucianism and Others (0.01%)

The population of West Papua Province embraces different religions. Data in 2022 showed that the largest percentage of religious believers were Protestant Christians (54.17%), then Islam (36.74%), Catholic Christians (8.71%), Hinduism (0.19%), and Buddhism (0.19%).

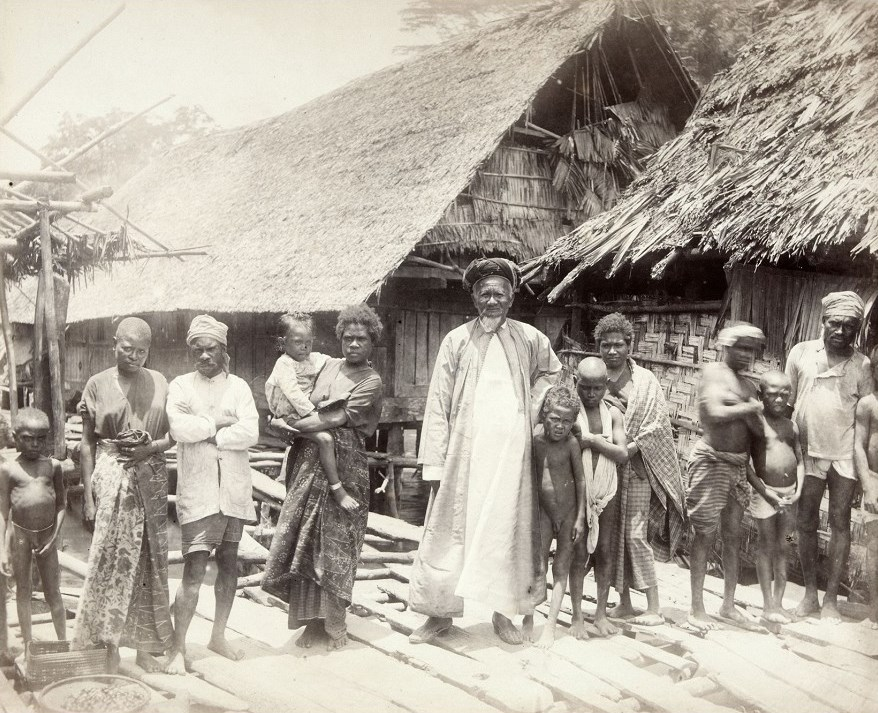
Haji Oea Saraka, a successful hajj pilgrim from Sekru Village near Fakfak (1890–1896)

Islam had been present in Papua since the 15th century, because of interaction with Muslim traders and Moluccan Muslim Sultanates especially the earliest being Bacan. Though there were many earlier theories and folk legends on origin of Islam, sometimes mixed with indigenous folk religion of Fakfak, Kaimana, Bintuni, and Wondama. These include Islamic procession of Hajj pilgrimage that do not go to Meccah, but to Nabi Mountain, near Arguni Bay and Wondama Bay. According to Aceh origins, a Samudra Pasai figure called Tuan Syekh Iskandar Syah was sent to Mesia (Kokas) to preach in Nuu War (Papua), he converted a Papuan called Kriskris by teaching him about Alif Lam Ha (Allah) and Mim Ha Mim Dal (Muhammad), he became Imam and first king of Patipi, Fakfak. Syekh Iskandar brought with him some religious texts, which were copied onto Koba-Koba leaves and wood barks. Syekh Iskandar would return to Aceh bringing the original manuscripts, but before that he would visit Moluccas specifically in Sinisore village. This corresponds with the village's origin of Islam that instead came from Papua. A study by Fakfak government, mentioned another Acehnese figure called Abdul Ghafar who visited Old Fatagar in 1502 under the reign of Rumbati King Mansmamor. He would preach in Onin language (lingua franca of the area at the time) and was buried next to village mosque in Rumbati, Patipi Bay, Fakfak.

Meanwhile, based on oral history of Fakfak and Kaimana, a Sufi by the name of Syarif Muaz al-Qathan from Yemen constructed a mosque in Tunasgain, which was dated using the 8 merbau woods previously used as ceremonial Alif poles for the mosque around every 50 years, to be from 1587. He was also attributed of converting Samay, an Adi ruler of the royal line of Sran. Islam only grew in the coastal part of Papua especially in the bird's head areas, and did not spread to the interior part of the island until Dutch started sending migrants in 1902 and exiled Indonesian leaders in 1910 to Merauke. Muhammadiyah figures were exiled in Papua and in their exile help spread Islam in the region. Later on to help members with education issues, Muhammadiyah only formally sent its teacher in 1933.

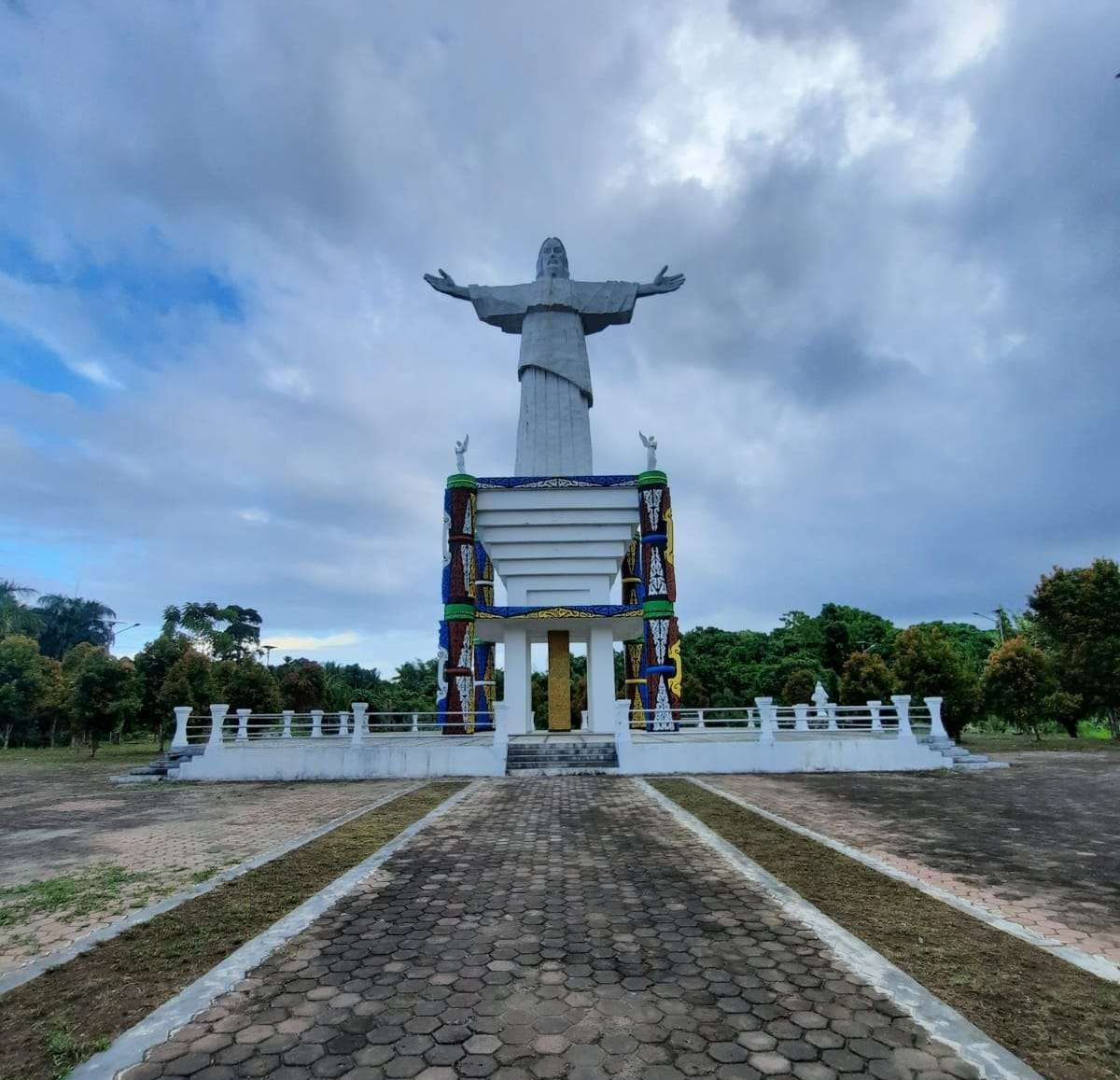
Jesus statue in Mansinam Island constructed in 2014.

In the province, the city of Manokwari has come to be known as the "Gospel City", as it is directly inland from Mansinam Island where the first European missionaries of Carl Ottow and Johann Geissler, under the initiative of Ottho Gerhard Heldring to reached Papua. They were under permission from Tidore Sultanate, who facilitated them with a ship, and connected them with his vassals in the area, like the later Salawati king of Muhammad Amminudin Arfan as their local guide. They entered Papua at Mansinam Island, near Manokwari on 5 February 1855. The date has become a significant local Christian holiday known as "Gospel Day", celebrated annually across Indonesian Papua.

=== Language ===
Indonesian is the official language in the Papua Barat province, just like other provinces in Indonesia. All road signs and documents released by the provincial government are written in Indonesian. However, Papuan Malay is used as the lingua franca of the province, both as a trade language and in inter-ethnic communication. Papuan Malay is considered to be similar to Ambonese Malay and Manado Malay language, and is mutually intelligible with Indonesian though it has been highly influenced by local languages. Nevertheless, its usage is currently [when?] diminishing as the proportion of people who are more fluent in Standard Indonesian is increasing.

The number of local languages used by the native peoples of the Papua Barat province reaches 34 consisting of approximately 14 Austronesian languages and 20 Papuan languages.

Regional languages in the Papua Barat province are threatened with extinction, because there are fewer and fewer users. Most regional languages in the province are threatened with extinction, if not immediately documented and preserved. The threat of extinction is due to economic, educational and political problems. The indigenous Papuans who transact on the market will use Indonesian, because the buyers or sellers are migrants or they speak a different Papuan language. The need for children to use Indonesian daily and the lack of education in schools about regional languages largely contributes to their disuse and extinction.

== Culture ==
Like the other provinces which form part of Indonesian Papua, the Papua Barat province is inhabited by different tribes.

=== Traditional houses ===
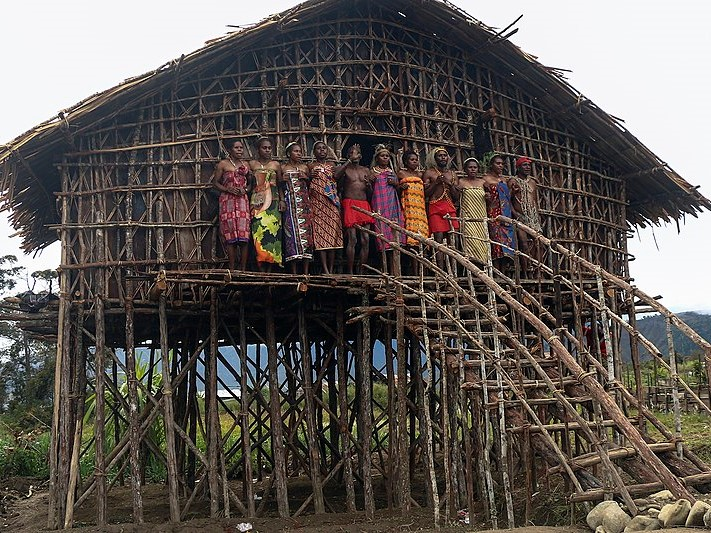
Rumah Kaki Seribu

The traditional house of people in this province is called Rumah Kaki Seribu (Thousand Legs House) because it is a stilt house with many pillars which is the reason for its name. The roof was made of straw or sago leaves and wood as its pillars. The pillars are useful for protecting the inhabitants from enemies and the threat of people with evil intentions or black magic. Traditionally to warm the occupants, hot ember will be put below the house.

=== Clothing ===
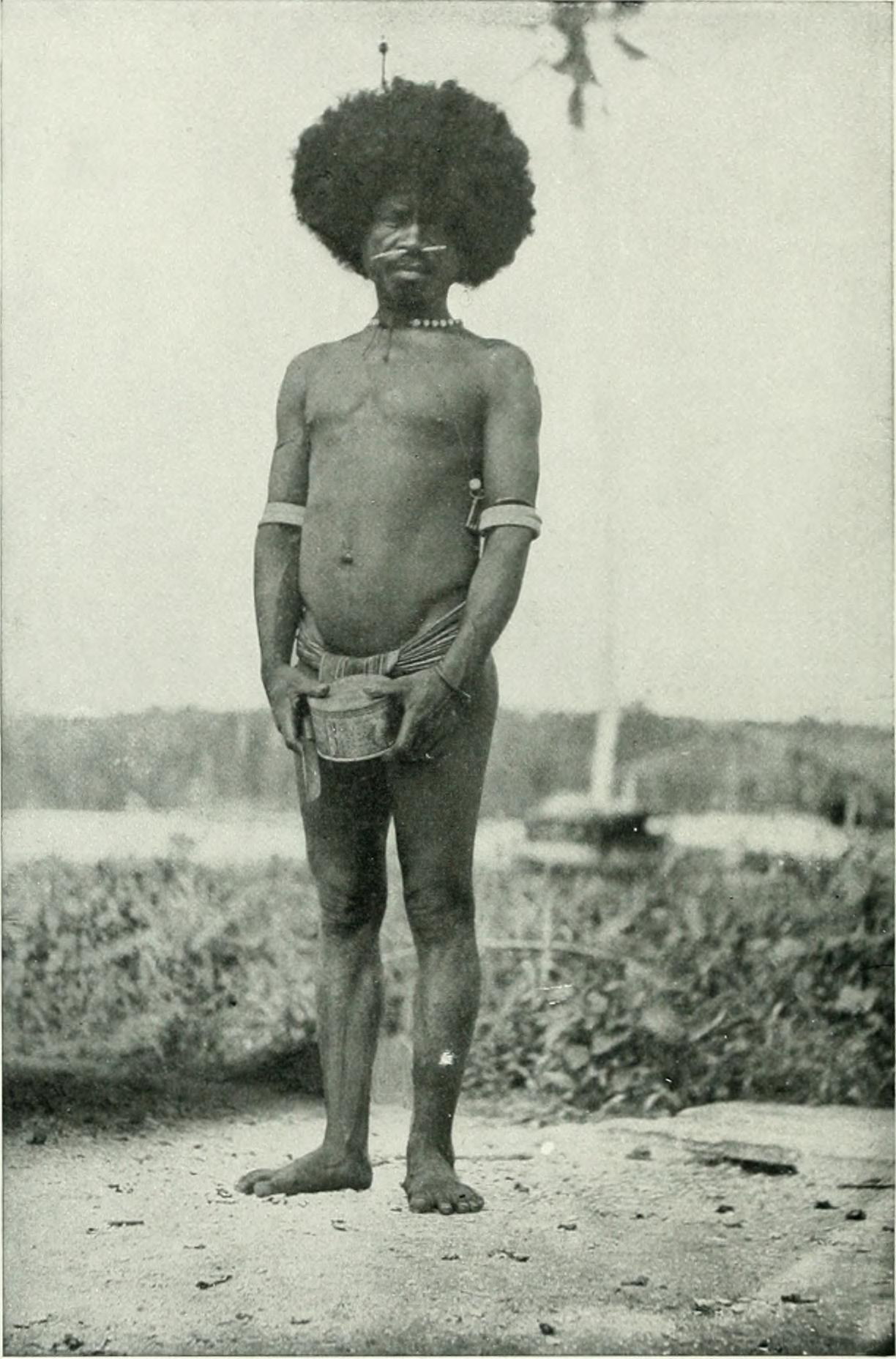
Doreri man with a loincloth

Many tribes in West Papua now wear fabric as part of their traditional attire. These fabrics are called kain timur, a type of tenun. It is a prized possession usually passed down through generations and used as a dowry. In the past, these were rare and only owned by rich people who obtained them through trade with islands to the west, specifically Timor Island, hence the name.

As a result, common men and women wore loincloths made from leaves, like the ones still worn by the Maniwak, or tree bark and orchids called mogra (meyah). With more intensive trades and increasing capabilities to produce their own larger fabrics, now women can wear them like sarongs, covering up to their chest. These kain dada (chest clothes) can also be a simple black cloth or batik fabric with Papuan motifs. In addition, Mbaham and Matta women from the Onin peninsula also wear kebaya, usually yellow or white in colour.

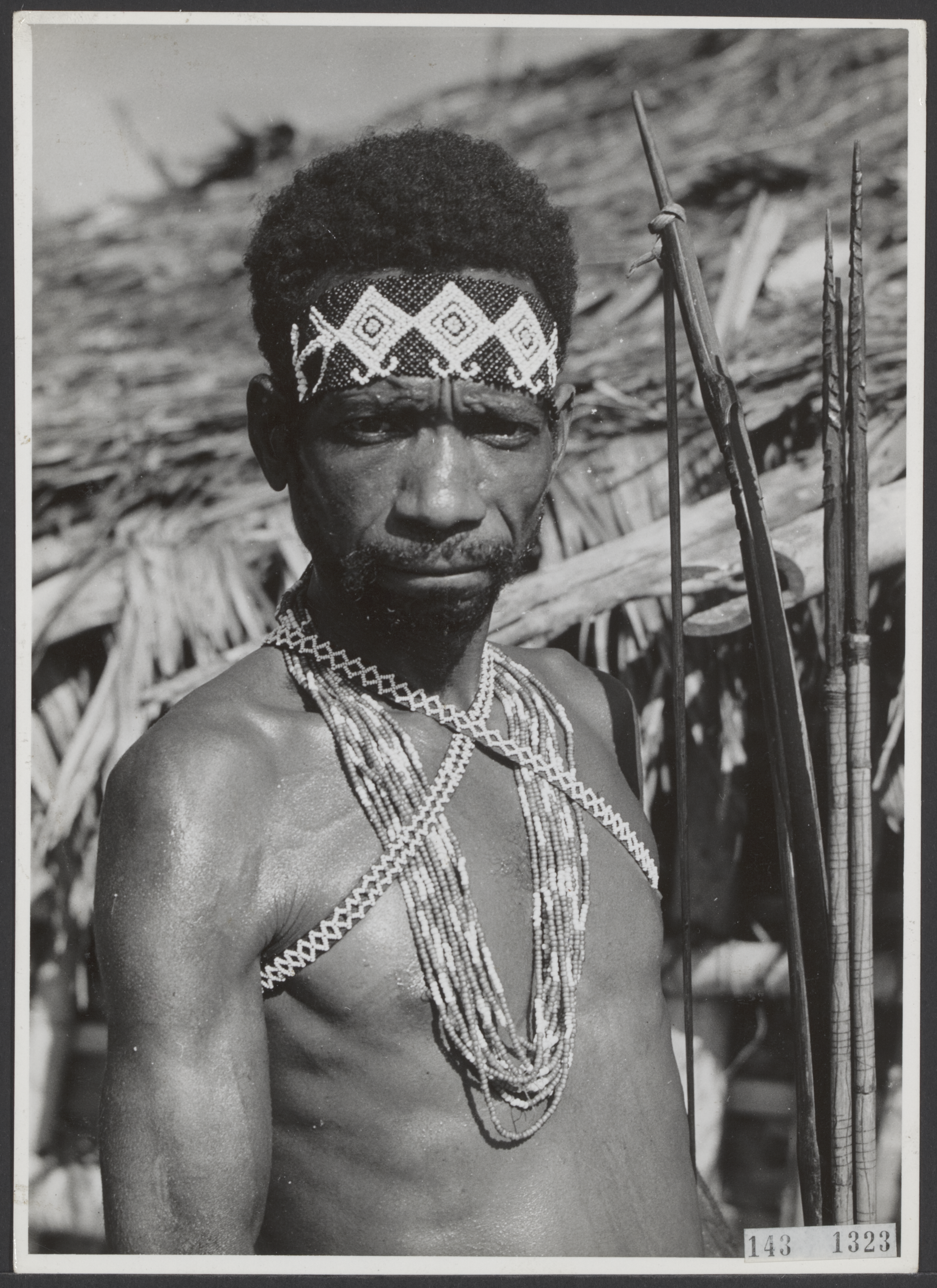
Sougb man with beaded necklaces, cross sashes, and headband

Men are usually bare-chested and wear loincloths made from fabric, usually red in colour but can also be black, such as the ones worn by the Kuri. Other Arfak ornaments include bracelets made from glass beads called riya/liya and bead necklaces called demaya. Arfak men also wear two-bead sashes creating a cross pattern on their chest called breb/rihmo and a woven headband also decorated with glass beads called miyepa. These ornaments can also be found among other tribes.

=== Traditional dance ===
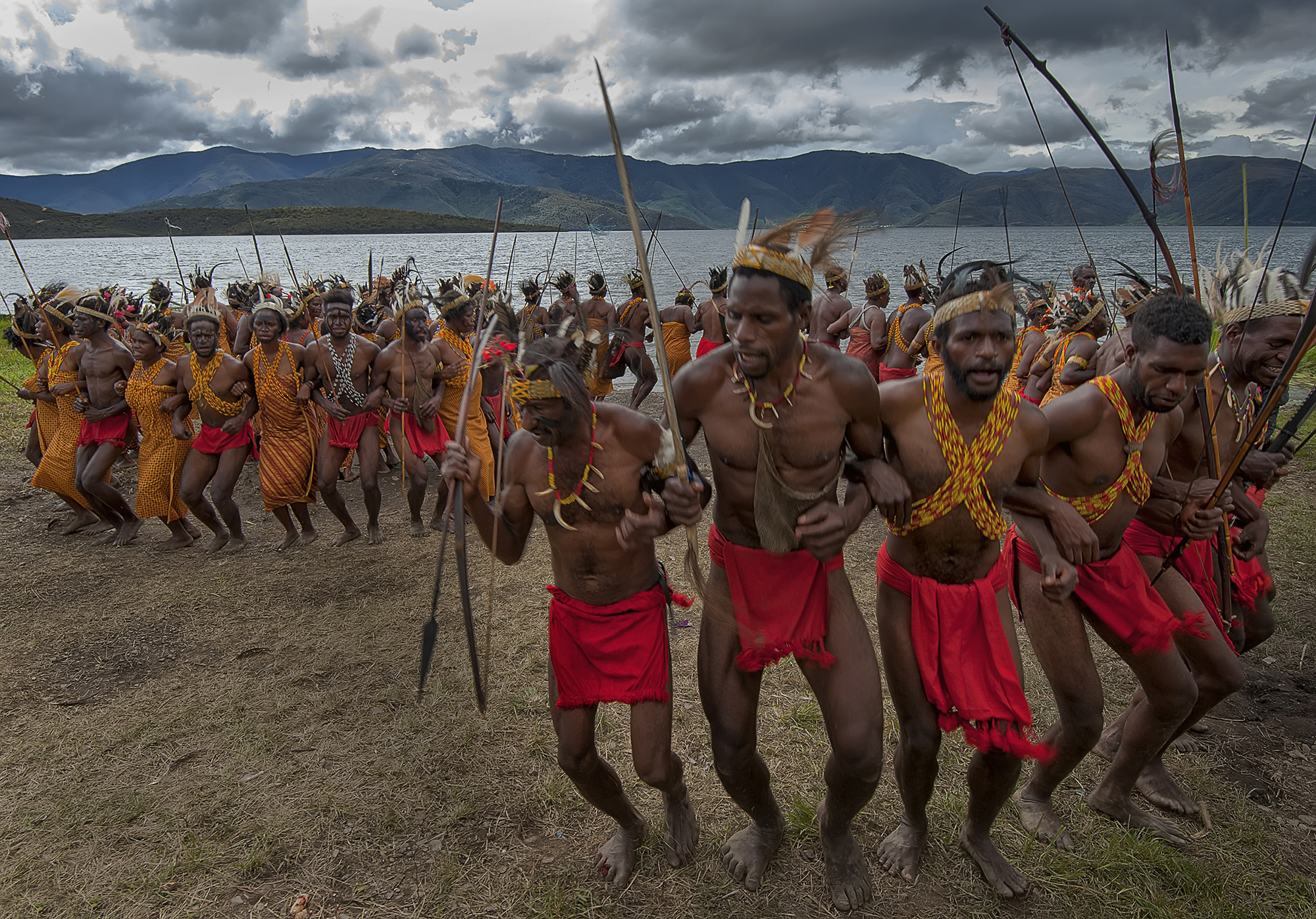
Tumbu Tanah Dance of the Arfak people

As West Papua consists of many tribes, there are many traditional dances from each tribe. However, a commonly shared dance among the Arfak tribes was what Ottow and Geissler, 19th century German missionaries in the area, called the Tumbu Tanah Dance (ground stomp dance). Previously, Hattam people called the dance Ibihim, Isim for the Moile people, Mugka for the Meyakh people, and Mayonhora for the Sough people. The dance consists of two basic movements called bihim ifiri kai cut, which is hopping while stomping the ground, imitating cuscus and namdur, and yam, which is the interlocking of dancers arms at the elbows. Then the dancers will form three formations imitating snake, jey/srem: a long line; ikrop: a half circle; and nimot: a full circle. The dance will be accompanied by music and singing either diun (songs about praising ancestors), nihet duwei (situational songs depending on the purpose of the dance), or isiap (encouraging shouts by the dancers to be ready).

Yospan dance is another dance originating from West Papua, this dance is an amalgamation of two traditional dances, namely Yosim dances originating from Sarera Bay (Serui/Yapen, Waropen) and Pancar dances originating from Biak, Numfor, and Manokwari. The musical instruments used for Yosim are usually Cuku lele (ukulele) and guitars, which shows foreign influences as these were not instruments from Papua. Included was also local bass made from three strings, with the strings made from pandan leaves. As well as Kalabasa, a dried calabash, which was then filled with beads. In Yosim dance, the women are dressed with weavings to cover the chest, and headress made from bird feathers. While the men are bare-chested and wearing the same headress. The dance movement are more energetic though simple. In Pancar dance, the music are from Tifa drums which is the universal instruments for coastal Papuans. The drum skin is usually made from soa-soa (lizards). The movements are more stiff following the Tifa beats.

Movements include Seka, this dance movement are usually from southern coast with famous version from Kaimana, Fakfak, and Timika. In Pacul Tiga, or Pancar Meneru the dancer swing forward three steps, and throw both arms and one leg to the left and right, which was then repeated for the other leg. Jef movements are influenced by rock and roll dance from 1969 to 1971, Gale-Gale movements are from Wondama Bay and Mor-Mambor islands. Pancar movements are performed by the dancers move in a circle. These movements was inspired by animals, and have four variations.

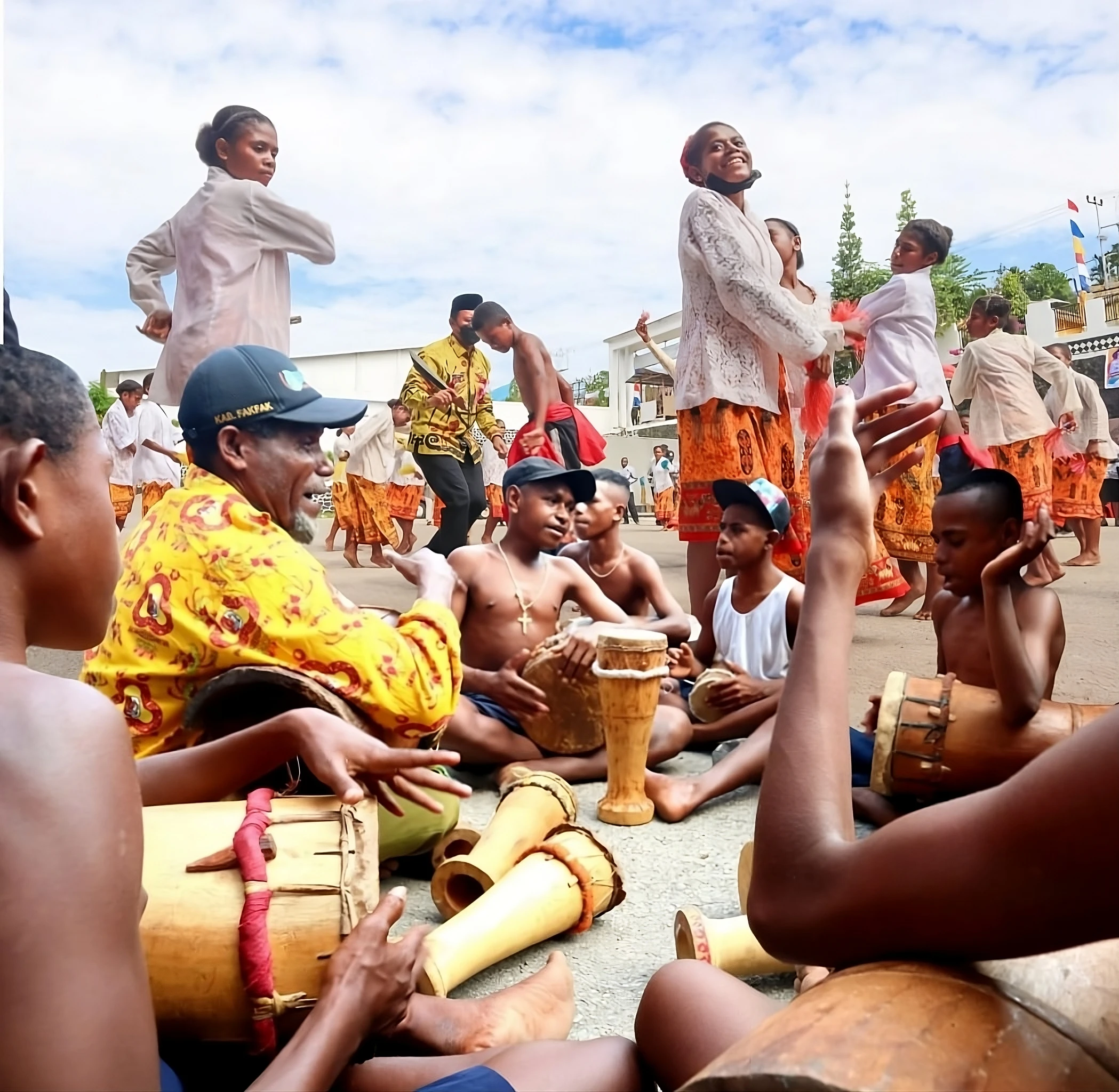
Titir Tummour dance of the Mbaham-Matta

Suanggi dance is also another dance from the regions around Cendrawasih Bay on the northern coast of New Guinea. This dance is basically an exorcism ritual by a bereaved husband after his wife becomes the victim of possession by mythical creatures (angi-angi). Suanggi is an evil spirit that wanders the earth because it cannot find peace and will take possession of a woman. The dance is usually only performed when death victims are found, which prompts the tribal leaders to initiate the ritual before the tribe members start the dance.

== Transport ==
In West Papua, the largest airport is Dominique Edward Osok Airport, located in Sorong. In addition, there are also Fakfak Airport, Rendani Airport in Manokwari and Utarom Airport in Kaimana. Major flights to the West Papua area from Jakarta, Surabaya and Makassar are usually via the airport in Sorong or Biak, then continue with smaller aircraft.

== Tourism ==
In Doreri Bay there are three small islands: Mansinan Island, Lemon Island and Raimuti Island. These islands have a collection of coral reefs. It is estimated that this place has more than 20 former World War II wrecks. But what can be seen clearly is that there are around 6 ships such as Pasir Putih Wreck, a type of Navy patrol boat with a length of 12–22 meters. Pillbox Wreck, a type of commercial cargo carrier carrying around 9–16 meters of ammunition, Cross Wreck is a kind of patrol boat, Mupi Wreck and Shinwa Maru, a cargo ship.

The Cendrawasih Bay National Park have a unique geological structure and very important oceanographic history. This marine national park has extensive coral reefs of the highest quality in the world. Cendrawasih Bay National Park is in five regions and two provinces, namely Teluk Wondana Regency and Manokwari Regency in West Papua Province and Nabire Regency, Yapen Island Regency and Waropen Regency in Papua Province. Local communities living around national parks use marine resources as a source of life. Cendrawasih Bay National Park is a bay surrounded by several islands, including Biak Island, Yapen Island, and the mainland New Guinea. Administratively, the area is in two Regency, namely Teluk Wondama Regency, West Papua Province and Nabire Regency, Papua Province.

== Villages ==
- Mogoi Baru
- Sarbe

== Notable people ==
- Abdul Hakim Achmad Aituarauw, Indonesian politician and King of Kaimana
- Adolf Kabo, Indonesian footballer
- Dominggus Mandacan, Indonesia politician
- Engelberd Sani, Indonesian footballer
- Johannes Abraham Dimara, Indonesia national hero, leader of Trikora infiltration force in Etna Bay
- Machmud Singgirei Rumagesan, Indonesian national hero
- Marlina Flassy, anthropologist and the first woman to be a Dean at Cenderawasih University
- Ria Thielsch, Dutch singer, former model and dancer

== See also ==
- Free Papua Movement
- Districts of West Papua
- List of rivers of West Papua
- Papua Conflict
