= Johannes Abraham Dimara =

Indonesian National Hero (1916–2000)

Johannes Abrahan Dimara
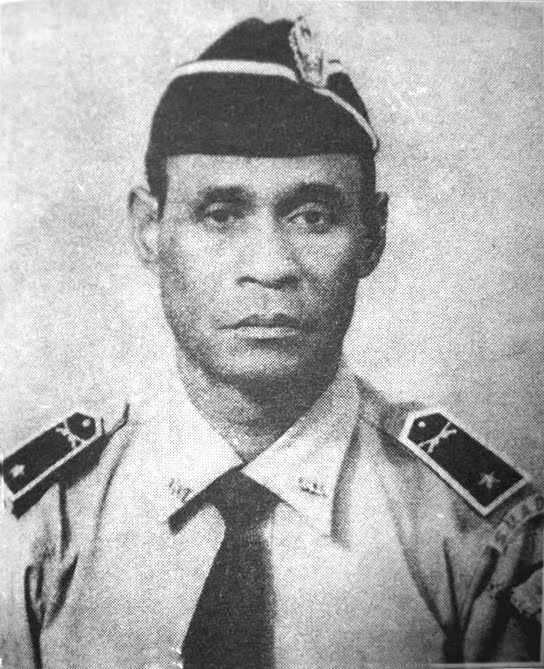
- Born: 16 April 1916; Korem, North Biak, Biak Numfor, Dutch East Indies
- Died: 20 October 2000 (aged 84); Jakarta, Indonesia
- Burial place: Kalibata, South Jakarta
- Military career
- Allegiance: Empire of Japan (1942–1945); Indonesia (1945–1962)
- Branch: Kempei-Ho; Indonesian Army
- Service years: 1942–1945, 1945–1962
- Rank: Pembantu Letnan Satu; Major (1962)
- Units: APRIS Pattimura Battalion; Dewan Pertahanan Nasional (Depertan); T&T VII/Wirabuana; Resimen Infanteri-25
- Conflicts: Indonesian National Revolution; Invasion of Buru; Infiltration of Etna Bay
- Awards: National Hero of Indonesia

Major TNI Johannes Abraham Dimara (16 April 1916 – 20 October 2000) was an Indonesian National Hero from Papua.

== Early life ==
He was born Arabei Dimara in Korem, North Biak, Biak Numfor on 16 April 1916 to a korano (village leader) Willem Dimara. He was schooled in a primary school of his village under Tuan Guru Simon Soselisa. At the age of 13 with approval from his family, he was adopted by Elias Mahubesi a colonial police leader from Ambon. He was then baptised with the name Johannes Abraham while still keeping his family name. He graduated from basic training at Ambon in 1935. He then entered the School of Agriculture at the Laha in 1940. He then entered the School of Education Gospel. After graduation, he became a gospel teacher in Leksuka district, Buru Island.

Japanese forces entered Buru in early 1942, after which they closed all school. Priests and headmasters who funds the school were imprisoned and the teachers became unemployed. He at 26 years old then met with leadership of Japanese administration in Buru, Ishido, and the leader of Japanese occupation forces, Watanabe. As they were searching for a papuan member to join Kempei-Ho or Hei Ho. (Auxiliary units to help supplement the main Kenpeitai forces). Afterward he undergone military training and became member of Hei Ho forces under Japanese occupation in Buru island.

== Indonesian National Revolution ==
At the end of the Second World War, Headquarter of Japanese forces in Ambon was isolated and its communication with the surrounding regions were cut. Information about the war and Indonesia independence proclamation only reached Ambon in Mei 1946, when ALRI expedition forces to Moluccas consisting two ships under Indonesian flag of KM Sindoro commanded by Ibrahim Saleh and first officer Yosaphat Sudarso and KM Semeru commanded by Moelyadi arrived 500 m of the coast of Namlea the main city in Buru island. Forces under Dimara met with them on the ship and suggest the ships to dock in Namelek. Local police forces were suspicious but were convinced by Dimara.

Dimara, Abdullah Kaban, Abdullah bin Talib, and Adam Patisahursiwa, a former district head of Namlea then headed to Kumbrasa to meet with Raja of Kumbrasa, Bahadin Besi and with Raja of Namlea to ask for support. Afterward they organised a meeting on 6 April 1946 with Anton Papilaya, a member of the expedition forces that managed to land. They then organized into two forces to attack Namlea from Kumbrasa under Dimara and Papilaya consisting of pemuda (youths), members of expeditionary forces that managed to land, former colonial police, and former Hei Ho.

On 8 April 1946, the citizens of Namlea were told to clean the street as Resident of Moluccas Van Ball will be visiting the town. Forces under Dimara and Papilaya consisting a total of about 300 people disguised as street cleaner, before eventually attacked police posts. One police was killed in the accident before they start to attack the district office. Similar to Hotel Yamato incident in Surabaya, they lower the Dutch flag and tore off the blue strip and rehoisted as the Red and White flag. The town was under control by Dimara and Papilaya forces for 5 days. On 12 April 1946, HMS Princes Irene arrived of the coast and sent small KNIL forces on a boat to land. After shooting incidents, where a KNIL member shot at civilian houses randomly and pemuda shot a KNIL member point black, the invading forces retreated to their own villages. Papilaya and Dimara split up and went into hiding.

Eventually Papilaya was captured and sent to Ambon, meanwhile Dimara was saved by a village leader and was given boat to go out of Buru. Afterward he alongside Abdullah Kaban dan Adam Patisahursiwa went to Sanama Island although promptly captured and were taken to Pohon Pale prison. In July 1946 in a military trial in Batu Gajah, Ambon under chief judge Van der Room, he was sentenced to 20 years in prison. Because of his long sentence he was sometime entrusted as foreman of his cell. He used an opportunity to fled prison alongside two men and headed to Seram. They were helped by Wakasihadan villagers to cross to Seram.

After continuously fleeing islands, he arrived in Manipa island and sleep in a house of Haji Musa. Although the police from Piru came to Haji Musa house, they managed to flee. Eventually he went back to Kumbrasa and lived quite freely in Raja Bahadiri Besi house as he was unrecognized. However, he surrendered himself to police in Hatahao village and put back in Pohon Pule prison. Although eventually he alongside 12 other was moved to Trunku Layang prison that housed over 3000 inmates. In here he became acquainted with Andi Bahtiar, Hasanuddin, Andi Arsad, Indonesian revolution leaders from South Sulawesi. In December 1949 he was freed from prison as Netherlands recognized Indonesian independence.

== Expedition against the Republic of South Maluku (RMS) ==
He returned to Ambon, and RMS rebellion was underway. Fearing his safety, Dimara alongside a couple other notable Indonesian revolution individuals fled to Makassar and joined Pattimura Battalion under Major Pieters. He was assigned to unit under lt. Mailoa tasked to retake Buru island. During this time Buru was under the control of sergeant major Liestieka former member of green beret KNIL with forces of about 150 men. On 14 July 1950, his battalion and Battalion under Pelupessy managed to take over Buru. Although he was shot in the shoulder and was hospitalised in Makassar. Sukarno met him when he visited Makassar to meet with frontline soldiers taken care in Stella Maris hospital. After Dimara recovered he went to Jakarta and live in the house of King of Sekar, Machmud Singgirei Rumagesan, which at the time became member of National Advisory Council (DPA).

== West Irian dispute ==
He then helped fight for the return of territory of Papua into the hands of the Indonesian Republic. In 1950, he was appointed Chairman of OPI (Liberation Organization of Irian/Papua). The organization consisted of Papuan members that had undergone military training in Ambon Island. He would later be enlisted under Lt Col Suprapto Sukowati's 25th Infantry Regiment, to be sent to West New Guinea. As a serviceman of the Indonesian National Armed Forces (as part of the Indonesian Army), he led 42 members team on a 17 October 1954 infiltration mission to Papua that managed to abduct the Dutch police officer Sergeant van Krieken when a lone Dutch patrol was spotted and other police officers jump the ship to flee. Leaving van Krieken alone, who was promptly taken to Dobo, while Dimara main forces slip into the jungle. However, he was arrested by the Netherlands New Guinea government and was thrown into Boven-Digoel prison. According to his biographer Carmelia Sukmawati Roring in Fa Ido Ma, Ma Ido Fa: J.A. Dimara Lintas Perjuangan Putra Papua published in 2000, in Digul prison, Dimara was separated from his men, and then they were tortured with their hands chained. Even though they were inside cells, their hands were still handcuffed. In 1955 he was instrumental in Benyamin Felubun setting up Untuk Pembebasan Irian (UPI) from Digul prison that eventually became PSP-45 in the succeeding years. He was released in 1960, and became Indonesian diplomatic delegation.

When President Sukarno proclaimed Operation Trikora in 1962, he and the President became figures of the young people of Papua and they were invited to TRIKORA headquarters in Yogyakarta. He also called on the entire community in West Papua and Papuans nationwide to participate in order to support the union of West Papua as a constituent territory of the Republic. In 1962, the New York Agreement was held. He became a part of the delegation with the Minister of Foreign Affairs of Indonesia. Other Papuans in this delegation included Mary Dapare, Moses Weror and Mathias Wondiri.

The content of the agreement ultimately required the Dutch Kingdom to be willing to surrender West Papua to the government of Indonesian Republic, effective 1 May 1963.

On Independence Day, 17 August 1962, a pro-integration rally was held in front of the palace (at that time there were no Monas) and Dimara, wearing chains, was severed in front of the crowds who attended at Lapangan Banteng, Jakarta. Bung Karno saw that moment and was inspired to make a statue of the liberation of West Irian. Thus, the West Irian Liberation Monument built in honor of the integration of Papua is less than 1.5 kilometres (0.9 mi) from Merdeka Palace at the grounds of Lapangan Banteng.

== Honours ==
After Operation Trikora, Dimara was still technically a bintara (warrant officer), despite his involvement in multiple important battles. As a result, Sukarno pushed for extraordinary commissioning for Dimara as an army Major, becoming the only person in Indonesian military with such a fast promotion from the ranks of the senior enlisted. His training was conducted personally by the Vice chief of staff of the army, Gatot Soebroto on 28 April 1962 in Army Headquarters (MBAD).

His medals include:

- Satyalancana Perang Kemerdekaan Kesatu
- Satyalancana Peristiwa Perang Kemerdekaan Kedua
- Satyalancana Satya Dharma
- Satyalancana Bhakti
- Satyalancana Gerakan Operasi Militer III
- Satyalancana Perintis Pergerakan kemerdekaan

For his services, Dimara was named, with Dr. J. Leimena, a National Hero of Indonesia on 11 November 2010.

== Death ==
Johannes Abraham Dimara died at the age of 84 on 20 October 2000 in Jakarta. While his son a punk rock aficionado, Yulianus Kores Dimara, died of Tuberculosis complications on 21 May 2020.
