= Wondama Bay Regency =

Regency in West Papua, Indonesia

Teluk Wondama Regency Kabupaten Teluk Wondama
- Regency
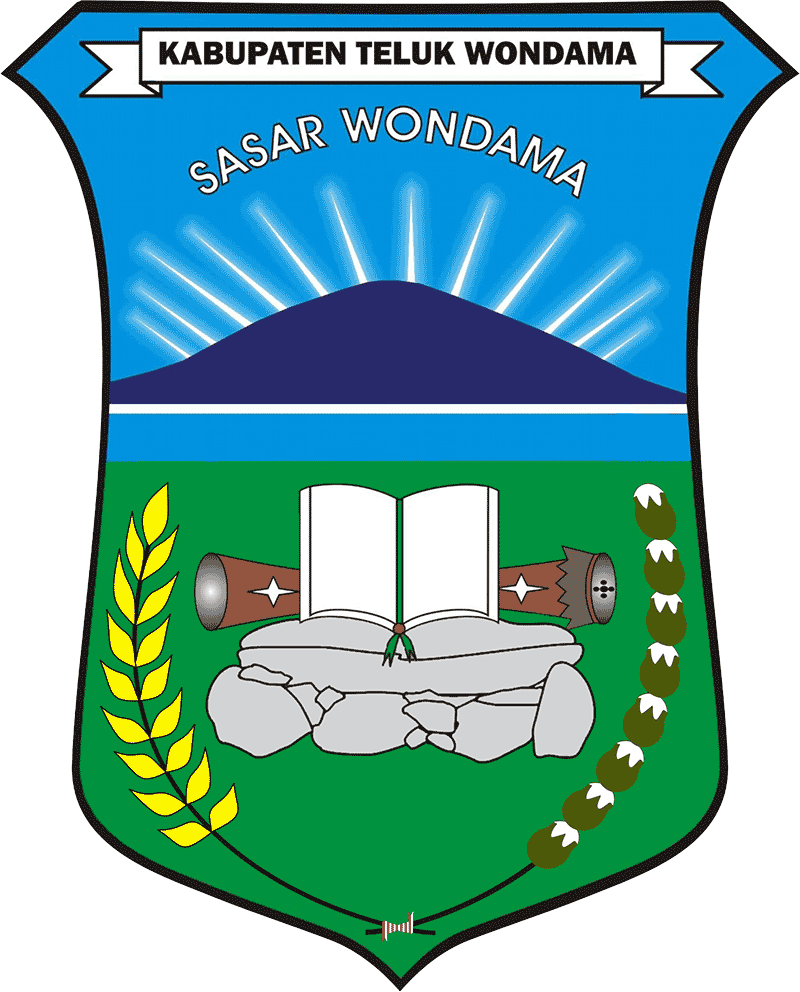
- Coat of arms
- Motto: Sasar Wondama (Wondama Light)
- Location in West Papua

- Location in Indonesia
- Coordinates: 2°42′S 134°30′E
- Country: Indonesia
- Province: West Papua
- Capital: Rasiei

Government
  - Regent: Elysa Auri
  - Vice Regent: Anthonius Alex Marani

Area
  - Total: 4,844.03 km^{2} (1,870.29 sq mi)
- Highest elevation (Wondiwoi Mountains): 2,250 m (7,380 ft)

Population (mid 2024 estimate)
  - Total: 47,494
  - Density: 9.8046/km^{2} (25.394/sq mi)
- Time zone: UTC+9 (Indonesia Eastern Time)
- Area code: (+62) 980
- Website: wondamakab.go.id

Teluk Wondama Regency or Wondama Bay Regency (Indonesian: Kabupaten Teluk Wondama; Dutch: Regentschap Wondammen-baai) is a regency of West Papua province of Indonesia. It covers a land area of 4,844.03 km^{2}, and had a population of 26,321 at the 2010 Census and 41,644 at the 2020 Census; the official estimate as of mid-2024 was 47,494 (comprising 24,806 males and 22,688 females). The administrative centre lies in the small town of Rasiei.

The northern half of the Regency contains several coastal districts along the east coast of the Bird's Head Peninsula and Bomberai Peninsula, and across Wondama Bay (a deep inlet to the south of Cenderawasih Bay) on the west coast of the Wondiboy Peninsula, but it also includes a number of islands in the southwest part of Cenderawasih Bay. The southern half of the Regency comprises the large but landlocked and nearly uninhabited Naikere District.

== Geography ==
Geographically, the district is located between 132°35' - 134°45' East Longitude and 0°15' - 3°25' South Latitude.

The northwestern part of the Regency consists of districts located along the east coast of the Bird's Head and Bomberai Peninsulas on the west side of Cenderawasih Bay and its southward extension of Wondama Bay; from north to south these districts are Soug Jaya (with the island district of Rumberpon off its coast), Wamesa (with the island district of Roswar at some distance from its coast), Nikiwar, Windesi and Kuri Wamesa. Most of the islands in Wondama Bay Regency are surrounded by coral reef that is teeming with rich marine life. Rasiei, the administrative capital of Wondama Bay, is a small port located on the east coast of Wondama Bay at the foot of the Wandammen or Wondiboy Peninsula which is covered by pristine tropical rainforest. The largest town is actually Wasior, further north along that coast. The coral reef and tropical rainforest have become important tourist attractions in this regency. The Department of Tourism and Culture of Wondama Bay Regency, in cooperation with the Indonesian Tourist Guide Association, has launched a website called Wondama Tourism to attract visitors to the regency.

== Borders ==
In the far northwest of the regency, the district of Soug Jaya is bordered to the north and west by South Manokwari Regency. The rest of the mainland parts of the regency are bordered to their west by Bintuni Bay Regency and Kaimana Regency, to the south by Kaimana Regency and to the east by Central Papua Province.

== Natural Reserves ==
Most of the Wandamen or Wondiwoi Peninsula is covered by the Wondiwoi Mountains (Pegunungan Wondiwoi) National Reserve, while most of the islands in the north of the regency (together with Anggrameos Island which lies off the east coast of the Peninsula and is part of Central Papua Province) are included in the Cenderawasih Bay National Park (formerly described as a Marine Nature Reserve until re-designated in 2002).

== Administrative districts ==
The regency comprises thirteen districts (distrik), tabulated below with their populations at the 2010 Census and the 2020 Census, together with the official estimates as of mid-2024. The table also includes the locations of the district administrative centres, the number of administrative villages in each district (totaling 75 rural kampung and one urban kelurahan - the latter being Wasior I), and its post code.

Kode Kemendagri	Name of District (distrik)	Area in km^{2}	Pop'n 2010 Census	Pop'n 2020 Census	Pop'n mid 2024 Estimate	Admin centre	No. of villages	Post code	List of kampung (villages)
92.07.07	Naikere	2,230.68	697	937	1,121	Wosimo	6	98342	Inyora, Oyaa, Sararti, Undurara, Wosimi, Yabore
92.07.04	Wondiboy	20.56	1,481	3,078	3,626	Wondiboi	4	98347	Issui, Kabouw, Kaibi, Wondiboy
92.07.09	Rasiey	194.53	2,619	4,224	4,895	Isea	9	98343	Isei, Nggatum, Rasiei, Sasirei, Senderawoy, Tandia, Torey, Uriemi, Webi
92.07.09	Kuri Wamesa	665.91	1,257	1,973	2,027	Ambuni	6	98341	Ambumi, Dusner, Nanimori, Simei, Sobiar, Yerenusi
92.07.01	Wasior	210.70	11,558	19,718	21,603	Wasior I	10	98346	Rado, Dotir, Maniwak, Wasior II, Maimari, Yomakan, Moru, Ramiki, Iriati (plus Wasior I kelurahan)
92.07.03	(Teluk) Duairi (Duairi Bay)	409.41	1,668	2,181	2,566	Aisandamui	4	98345	Aisandami, Sobey, Sobey Indah, Yopanggar
92.07.10	Roon	67.87	1,407	1,963	2,293	Yende	7	98344	Inday, Mena, Menarbu, Niab, Sariay, Syabes, Yende
92.07.02	Windesi	217.55	1,389	1,986	2,311	Windesi	5	98336	Sandey, Sombokoro, Wamesa Tengah, Windesi, Yopmeos
92.07.12	Nikiwar	251.33	753	1,520	1,779	Werabur	5	98331	Kurei, Mamisi, Tamoge, Werabur, Werianggi
92.07.05	Wamesa	190.01	628	815	1,156	Sabubar	5	98335	Ambuar, Karuan, Nordiwar, Sabubar, Yarpate
92.07.11	Roswar	109.16	613	658	838	Waprak	3	98332	Syeiwar, Waprak, Yomber
92.07.06	Rumberpon	101.97	1,619	1,683	2,158	Yembekiri	7	98333	Isenebuay, Iseren, Wetitindau, Yariari, Yembekiri II, Yomakan, Yombekiri I
92.07.13	Soug Jaya	174.36	632	908	1,121	Kaprus	5	98334	Kaprus, Nuspairo, Reyob, Siresi, Yarmatum
	Totals	4,844.04	26,321	41,644	47,494	Rasiey	76		

== Geography ==
Roswar and Rumberpon Districts are each formed by an island of the same name (surrounded by numerous offshore islets) situated in Cenderawasih Bay, while Roon District encompasses 29 disparate islands in the same bay off the northern end of the Wondiboy Peninsula - including Roon, Rarief, Rariau, Ripon, Pinai and Manupaseh Islands, and the Rouw Archipelago.
Roon District comprises seven villages, all on Roon Island (there are no villages on the smaller islands within the district) - Menarbu (which had 208 inhabitants at the 2020 Census), Sariay (with 14 inhabitants), Niab (227), Inday (235), Syabes (509), Mena (228) and Yende (414).
