= Lobo, Indonesia =

Lobo
- Village
- Location of the town in Indonesian Papua
- Coordinates: 3°45′S 134°5′E
- Country: Indonesia
- Province: West Papua
- Regency: Kaimana Regency
- District: Kaimana
- Time zone: UTC+9 (WIT)

Lobo is a village (kampung) in Kaimana district, Kaimana Regency, West Papua, Indonesia, off the coast of Bay of Kaimana. The settlement was established in 1828 by the Dutch. They established the Fort Du Bus at Lobo with the official opening on August 24, 1828.
