= Adi Island =

Island in Indonesia

Pulau Adi
Native name: Adi Jaya
- Location in Papua Location in Indonesia

Geography
- Coordinates: 4°12′54.654″S 133°28′0.807″E
- Area: 157.9 km^{2} (61.0 sq mi)
- Length: 44 km (27.3 mi)
- Width: 7 km (4.3 mi)
- Coastline: 100 km (60 mi)
- Highest elevation: 200 m (700 ft)

Administration
- Indonesia
- Province: West Papua
- Regency: Kaimana

Adi (or Adi Island, Indonesian: Pulau Adi) is an Indonesian island.

Adi is located approximately 450 kilometres (280 mi) south of the equator in the Seram Sea off the western coast of New Guinea. It is severed from the Bomberai Peninsula by Nautilus Strait, the narrowest width of which is only ten kilometres (6.2 mi). Adi marks the southern border of the Kamrau Bay; beyond lies the open Seram Sea.
