= Fort Du Bus =

Former Dutch administration and trading post in New Guinea

Fort du Bus
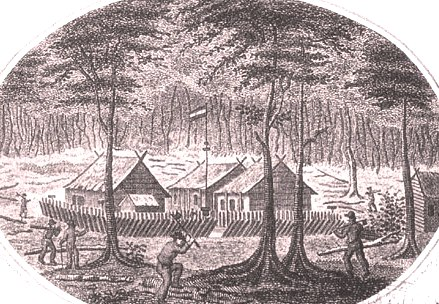
- Fort du Bus in 1828

- Location within Indonesia

General information
- Architectural style: Dutch trading post
- Location: Lobo, Kaimana district, Kaimana Regency, West Papua, Indonesia
- Coordinates: 3°38′40″S 133°41′43″E
- Construction started: 1828
- Demolished: 1835

Technical details
- Structural system: Palisaded enclosure
- Size: 15 acres (6.1 ha)

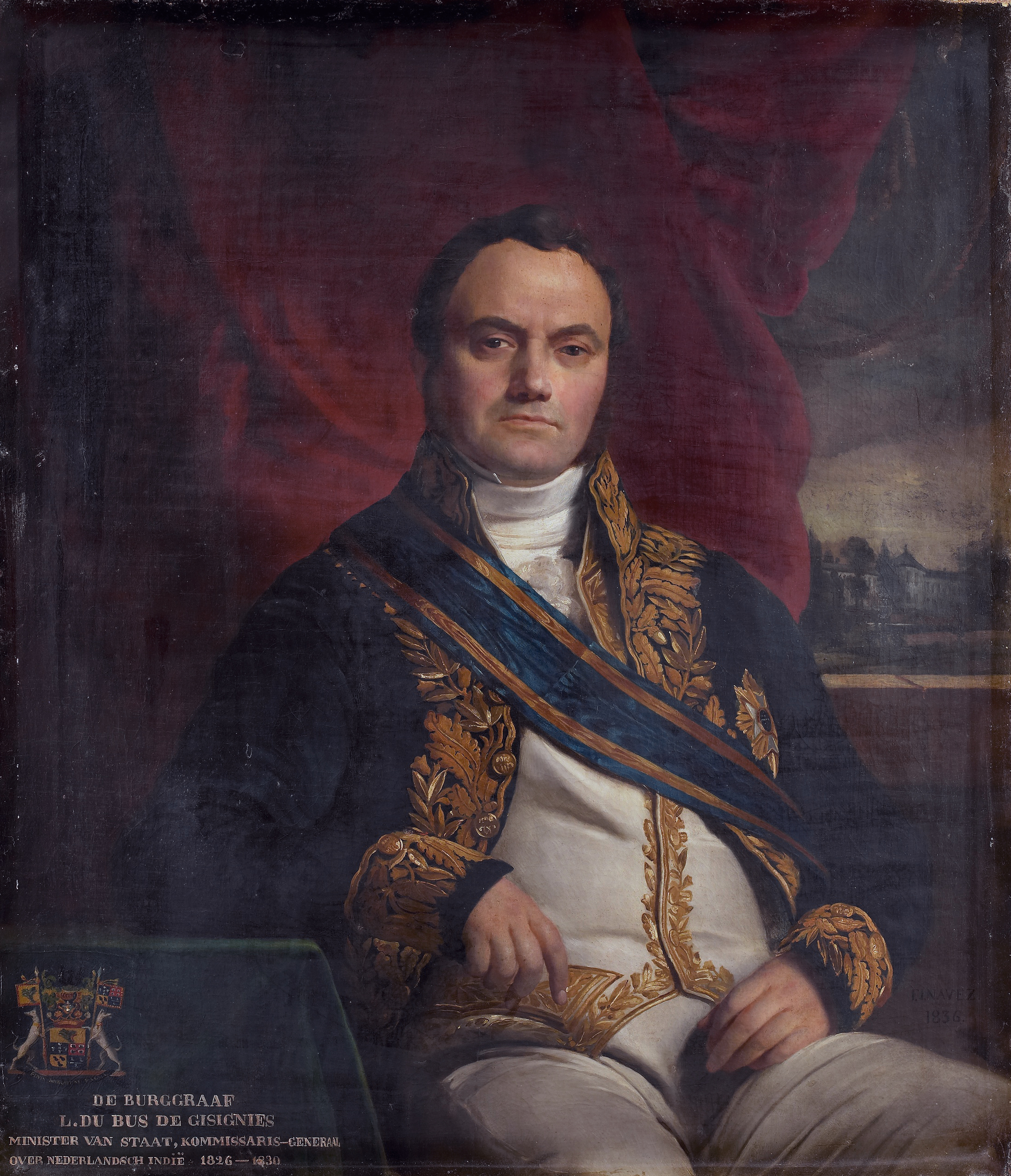
Léonard Pierre Joseph du Bus de Gisignies

Fort Du Bus was a Dutch administrative and trading post established in 1828 on Triton Bay on the southwest coast of New Guinea, in the current Indonesian regency of Kaimana, West Papua. Intended to counter British encroachment, it was the first European settlement in the region; it was abandoned in 1835, due to the unhealthy climate and attacks by natives. A monument currently stands on the original site of Fort du Bus.

== Background ==
Dutch New Guinea in the early 19th century was administered from the Moluccas. Although the coast had been mapped in 1825 by Lieutenant Commander D.H. Kolff, there had been no serious effort to establish a permanent presence in Dutch New Guinea. The British, however, had shown considerable interest in the area, and were threatening to settle it. To prevent this, the Governor of the Moluccas, Pieter Merkus, urged the Dutch government to establish posts along the coast.

== Exploration ==
On December 31, 1827 a royal authorization was issued, and on April 21, 1828 a small expedition led by Lieutenant Jan Jacob Steenboom, with two ships, the corvette Triton and the schooner Iris, left Ambon to search for a suitable location for a settlement. Lieutenant Commander C.J. Boers accompanied the expedition to make nautical observations and carry out further exploration. Five naturalists - Dr. H.C. Macklot (zoologist), Gerrit van Raalten (taxidermist), Pieter van Oort (artist), Salomon Müller (zoologist/botanist), and Alexander Zippelius (botanist) - were also on board.

After a stop at Banda on April 25, Triton and Iris continued on to New Guinea. Prospective sites on Dourga Strait and the Oetanata River proved impractical due to swampy land and reefs. At one point several officers and men were injured in an attack by natives. In early July Lt. Steenboom finally located a suitable site at the head of a small enclosed bay (promptly named Triton Bay), just east of the modern coastal town of Kaimana.

== Outpost ==
The ships remained with the settlers for two months, their crews helping construct several small buildings surrounded by a double palisade. On August 24, 1828, the birthday of King William I of the Netherlands, the Dutch flag was hoisted and the Netherlands claimed all of western Papua, which they called Nieuw Guinea Several local native chieftains proclaimed their loyalty to the Netherlands. The post was named Fort Du Bus for the then-Governor General of the Dutch East Indies, Leonard du Bus de Gisignies.

The settlement carried on a brisk trade with the coastal Asmat people and the Papuans of the interior, as well as Ceramese traders who arrived in roofed-over, 15-to-30-foot (4.6 to 9.1 m) long prahus. The Dutch bartered for massoia bark, aromatic woods, nutmeg, trepang, birds of paradise, and edible bird's nests. The inhabitants of the settlement were afflicted by diseases, primarily malaria, and the outpost was raided by natives from Ceram and Goram. Within 18 months of the founding of the fort, 24 men had died, and from a combined surviving total of 110 settlers and garrison, 83 were ill. In 1835 the surviving settlers were withdrawn, and the fort abandoned.

Dutch colonial officials continued to visit Triton Bay on a sporadic basis. In 1839 the French explorer Jules Dumont d'Urville visited the site and found an avenue of coconut palms, a lemon grove, and a few remains of buildings.
