= West New Guinea dispute =

International conflict

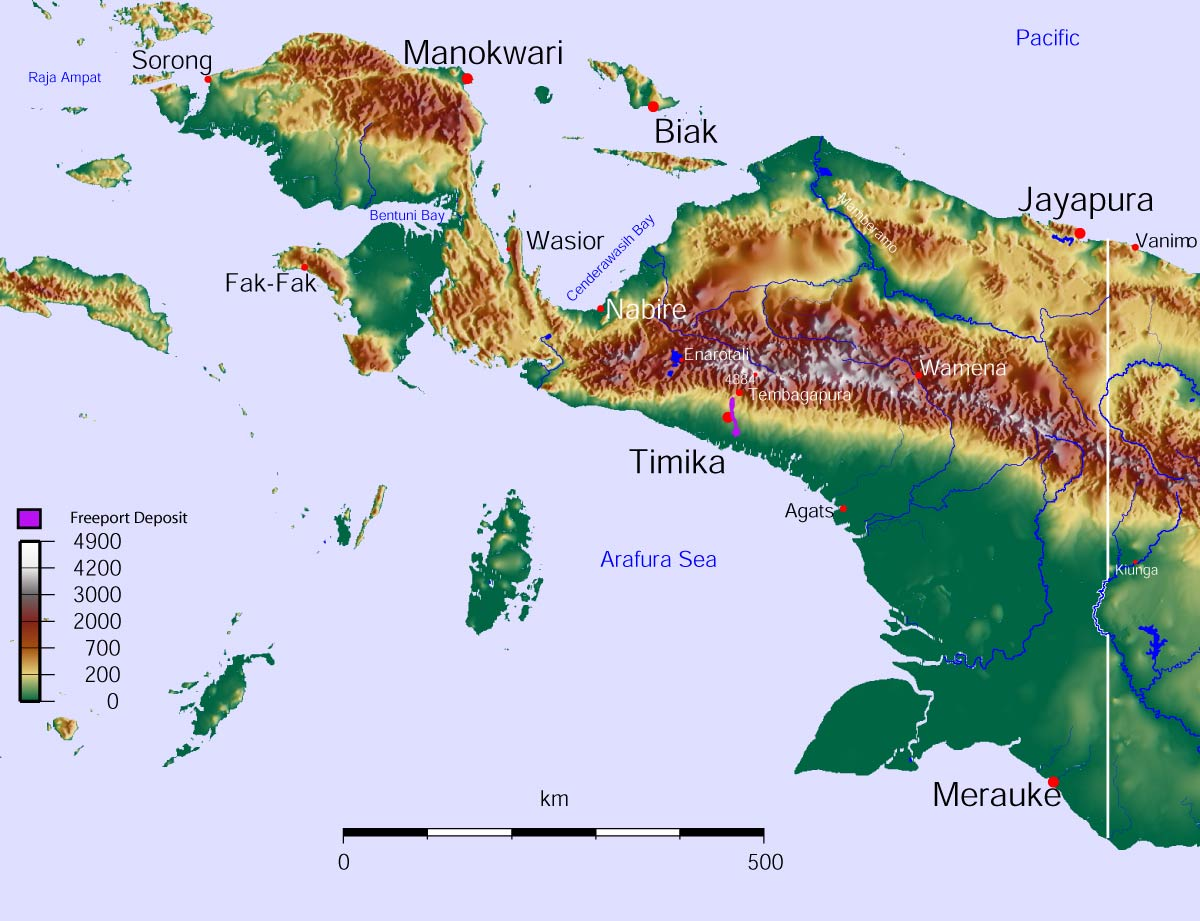
The disputed territory of West New Guinea

The West New Guinea dispute (1950–1962), also known as the West Irian dispute, was a diplomatic and political conflict between the Netherlands and Indonesia over the territory of Dutch New Guinea. While the Netherlands had ceded sovereignty over most of the Dutch East Indies to Indonesia on 27 December 1949 following an independence struggle, it retained control over its colony on the western half of New Guinea. The Indonesian government claimed this territory as well, on the basis that it had belonged to the Dutch East Indies and that the new Republic of Indonesia was the legitimate successor to the former Dutch colony.

During the first phase of the dispute (1950–1954), Indonesia pursued bilateral negotiations with the Netherlands. During the second phase (1954–1958), Indonesia attempted to raise support for its territorial claims in the United Nations General Assembly. During the third phase (1960–1962), Indonesia pursued a policy of confrontation against the Netherlands which combined diplomatic, political, and economic pressure with limited military force. The final stage of the confrontation with Indonesia also involved a planned military invasion of the territory. The Indonesians also secured military weapons and political and military support from the Soviet Union, which induced the United States to intervene in the conflict as a third-party mediator between Indonesia and the Netherlands. Following the New York Agreement on 15 August 1962, the Netherlands, under U.S. pressure, handed West New Guinea over to a United Nations Temporary Executive Authority, which subsequently handed the territory over to Indonesia on 1 May 1963. Following a controversial plebiscite in 1969, West New Guinea was formally integrated into Indonesia.

== Historical background ==
=== Origins ===
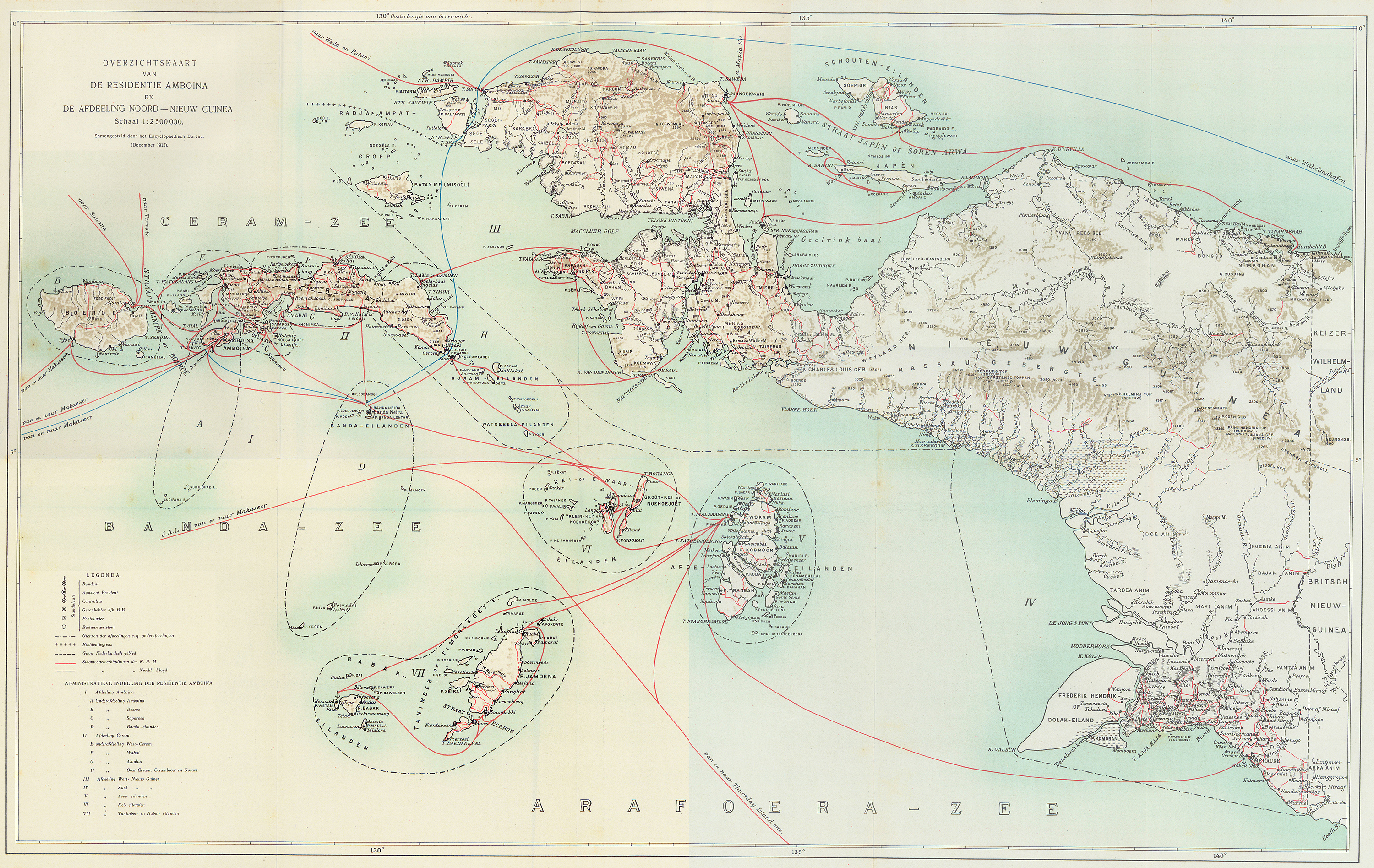
Dutch expeditions in Netherlands New Guinea 1907–1915.

Prior to the arrival of the Dutch, Indonesian principalities such as the Sultanate of Bacan, the Sultanate of Ternate and the Sultanate of Tidore claimed suzerainty over parts of Western New Guinea. These sultanates collected tributes from local rulers in the form of massoy, nutmeg, turtle shell, other spices, bird of paradise feathers, resins, and slaves or their value equivalent in other goods, which if not fulfilled would be punished by a hongi expedition, usually conducted by other rulers on behalf of the sultan. In 1828, the Netherlands established a settlement in Western New Guinea and also proclaimed sovereignty over the part of the island lying west of 141 degrees longitude. Considering that New Guinea had little economic value for them, the Dutch promoted Tidore as suzerain of Papua. By 1849, Tidore's borders had been extended to the proximity of the current international border between Indonesia and Papua New Guinea. Dutch activity in New Guinea was minimal until 1898 when the Dutch established an administrative centre, which was subsequently followed by missionaries and traders. Under Dutch rule, commercial links were developed between West New Guinea and Eastern Indonesia. In 1883, New Guinea was divided between the Netherlands, Britain, and Germany; with Australia occupying the German territory in 1914. In 1901, the Netherlands formally purchased West New Guinea from the Sultanate of Tidore, incorporating it into the Netherlands East Indies. During World War Two, Western New Guinea was occupied by the Japanese but was later recaptured by the Allies, who restored Dutch rule over the territory.

Following the Indonesian National Revolution, the Netherlands formally transferred sovereignty to the United States of Indonesia, the successor state to the Netherlands East Indies, on 27 December 1949. However, the Dutch refused to include Netherlands New Guinea in the new Indonesian Republic and took steps to prepare it for independence as a separate country. Following the failure of the Dutch and Indonesians to resolve their differences over West New Guinea during the Dutch-Indonesian Round Table Conference in late 1949, it was decided that the present status quo of the territory would be maintained and then negotiated bilaterally one year after the date of the transfer of sovereignty. However, both sides were still unable to resolve their differences in 1950, which led the Indonesian President Sukarno to accuse the Dutch of reneging on their promises to negotiate the handover of the territory. On 17 August 1950, Sukarno dissolved the United States of Indonesia and proclaimed the unitary Republic of Indonesia.

=== Competing claims ===
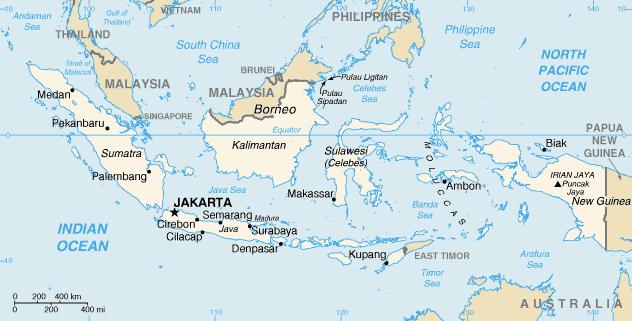
The Indonesian Republic saw itself as the successor to the Netherlands East Indies

"... The issue of Irian is not about ethnology; it is also not about whether we are ready (to administer) or not... The issue of Irian is about colonialism or not colonialism, about colonialism or independence. A part of our homeland is still colonized by the Dutch, this is a reality, and we don't want this. We want all of our homeland to be independent, all of our homeland "from Sabang to Merauke", zonder (without) exception ..."

— Sukarno, 17 August 1950

The Dutch argued that the territory did not belong to Indonesia because the Melanesian Papuans were ethnically and geographically different from other Indonesians, had always been administrated separately, did not participate in the Indonesian Revolution and that the Papuans did not want to be under Indonesian control. According to the political scientist Arend Lijphart, other underlying Dutch motives included West New Guinea's lucrative economic resources, its strategic importance as a Dutch naval base, and its potential role for housing the Netherlands' surplus population including Eurasians who had become displaced by the Indonesian Revolution. The Dutch also wanted to maintain a regional presence and to secure their economic interests in Indonesia.

On the other hand, Indonesia regarded West New Guinea as an intrinsic part of the country on the basis that Indonesia was the successor state to the Dutch East Indies. A number of Papuans participated in the momentous 1928 Youth Pledge, which is the first proclamation of an "Indonesian identity" which symbolically was attended by numerous ethnic youth groups from all over Indonesia. Indonesian irredentist sentiments were also inflamed by the fact that several Indonesian political prisoners (mainly leftist and communist from the failed 1926 uprising) had been interned at a remote prison camp north of Merauke called Boven-Digoel in 1935 prior to World War II. They made contact with many Papuan civil servants which formed Indonesian revolution groups in Papua. Some support also came from native kingdoms mainly around Bomberai Peninsula which had extensive relationship with Sultanate of Tidore, these efforts was led by Machmud Singgirei Rumagesan, King of Sekar in the region's western part. These sentiments were also reflected in the popular Indonesian revolutionary slogan Indonesia Merdeka — dari Sabang sampai Merauke ("Free Indonesia — from Sabang to Merauke"). The slogan indicates the stretch of Indonesian territory from the most western part in Sumatra, Sabang, and the most eastern part in Merauke, a small city in West New Guinea. Sukarno also contended that the continuing Dutch presence in West New Guinea was an obstacle to the process of nation-building in Indonesia and that it would also encourage secessionist movements.

== The political dimension ==
=== Local Indonesian nationalist movement ===
In 1944, Jan van Eechoud set up a school for bureaucrats in Hollandia (now Jayapura). One early headmaster of the school was Soegoro Atmoprasojo, an Indonesian nationalist graduate of Taman Siswa and former Boven-Digoel prisoners who fled to Australia after Japanese occupation, he later on tried to revolt on 31 December 1945 which failed. Many of these school early graduates and former associates of Soegoro would go on to found Indonesian independence movement in Western New Guinea, while some also go on to support Dutch authorities and pursue Papuan independence. The news of Indonesian independence proclamation arrived in New Guinea primarily through shipping laborers associated with Sea Transport Union of Indonesia (Sarpelindo), who were working for ships under the flag of Australian and Dutch. This led to the formation of the Committee on Indonesian Independence (KIM) in Abepura (currently in Jayapura) in October 1946. Originally it was led by J.A. Gerungan, a woman doctor who at that time led a hospital in Abepura-Hollandia. In December 1946, the leadership of KIM Jayapura changed to be led by Martin Indey, a former colonial police who were former prison guard of Soegoro. His deputy was Corinus Krey while the secretary is Petrus Walebong. KIM was one of the first Indonesian nationalist groups in New Guinea, whose members were mostly former associates of Soegoro. Simultaneously another separate Indonesian nationalist movement in New Guinea formed when G.S.S.J. Ratulangie, was exiled at Serui, along with his six staff by NICA on 5 July 1946. In this exile he met with Silas Papare, who was also exiled there due to his participation in Soegoro's revolt on 31 December 1945. This meeting resulted in the formation of an organization called Indonesian Irian Independence Party (PKII) on 29 November 1946. PKII was led by Silas Papare, alongside Alwi Rahman as chiefs, Ari Kamarea, Andarias Samberi as secretaries, and Thung Tjing Ek as treasurer. A year later, on 17 August 1947, Silas Papare and former students of Soegoro, including Albert Karubuy, Marthen Indey, Johans Ariks, Lodewijk Mandatjan, Barent Mandatjan, Semuel Damianus Kawab, Franz Joseph Djohari and their supporters would held a red and white flag-raising ceremony to commemorate the Indonesian independence day.

KIM and PKII members began to start movements in other areas of New Guinea, most of these were unsuccessful, and the perpetrators were either imprisoned or killed. In Manokwari, a movement called Red and White Movement (GMP) was founded, which was led by Petrus Walebong and Samuel D. Kawab. This movement later spread to Babo, Kokas, Fakfak, and Sorong. In Biak, a local branch of KIM was transformed into Party of Indonesian Independence (PIM) under the head of Lukas Rumkorem. Lukas would be captured and exiled to Hollandia, with the charge he instigated violence among local population. Still the movement did not disappear in Biak, Stevanus Yoseph together with Petero Jandi from Polongbangkeng's group, Terianus Simbiak, Honokh Rambrar, Petrus Kaiwai and Hermanus Rumere on 19 March 1948, instigated another revolt. The Dutch authorities had to send reinforcements from Jayapura. The Dutch imposed a harder penalty, with capital punishment for Petero Jandi, and live sentence to Stevanus Yoseph. In Sorong, a revolt happened under the movement of Pioneers of Independence Organization in 1946. This organization formed by former Heiho was led by Sangaji Malan. Meanwhile, besides pioneers of independence organization and the branch of PKII groups, another organization was formed on the 17 August 1947, called the Association of Young Men of Indonesia (PPI) under the leadership of Abraham Koromath.

Around the Bomberai Peninsula area of Fakfak, specifically in Kokas, Indonesian nationalism emerged under the King Al-Alam Ugar Sekar, Machmud Singgirei Rumagesan. He had history of disobedience against the Dutch authorities and was imprisoned in Hollandia. In prison, he managed to write a letter to Husni Thamrin, a member of Volksraad in Batavia and influential veteran member of Indonesian nationalist, who succeeded in convincing the court to release him. On 1 March 1946, he ordered that all the Dutch's flags in Kokas to be changed into Indonesian flags. The Dutch authorities later aided with incoming troops from Sorong arrested the King Rumagesan and he was given capital punishment, although later commuted to live imprisonment under popular demands. In 1946 in Kaimana, son of commissioned King of Sran, Muhammad Achmad Aituarauw founded an organization called Independence With Kaimana, West Irian (MBKIB). Through MBKIB, the people boycotted the celebration of Queen Wilhelmina anniversary every 31 August. In response of this activity, Aituarauw was arrested by the Dutch and was exiled to Ayamaru for 10 years in 1948. Other movements opposing the Dutch under local Papuan kings includes, New Guinea Islamic Union (KING) led by Ibrahim Bauw, King of Rumbati, Gerakan Pemuda Organisasi Muda led by Machmud Singgirei Rumagesan and Abbas Iha, and Persatuan Islam Kaimana (PIK) of Kaimana led by Usman Saad and King of Namatota, Kasim Ombair.

=== Indonesian irredentism ===
The Indonesian first president Sukarno took a strong interest in West Irian

Since 1947, in response to many civil servants, both Papuan locals and other islanders, sympathizing with Republican movement, the Dutch authorities increased its effort to imprison them or persuade them to switch sides although later on encourage them to pursue independence outside Indonesian Republic. In this early efforts, The most prominent members captured was Martin Indey, Hemanus Rumere and his associates from Biak were captured and imprisoned in Hollandia, meanwhile Corinus Krey was exiled to Digul. In 1949, the Round Table Conference concluded with Indonesia granted Independence as RIS with Republic of Indonesia as a constituent while New Guinea was under the administration of Dutch authorities with provision to discuss its fate after 1 year. Civil bureaucrats formerly filled with other Indonesian islanders suspected of harboring republican sympathies, were replaced by displaced Eurasians from Java, who filled many posts, especially in the middle and lower-middle position, which as a result stunted Papuan upward mobility. A Papuan advisory council in Biak, the Kainkain Karkara Biak, was established in 1947 on an elected basis but degenerated into a body that only advised the local District Officer on matters of customary law. A kind of municipal council had been envisaged in 1950 for some of the larger towns but discussions about their competence and membership composition dragged on over the years. Meanwhile, the Dutch managed to persuade some right-leaning Papuan elites like Markus Kaisepo, Abdullah Arfan, Johan Ariks, and also among leftist leaning elites like Nicolaas Jouwe, while other elites, mostly leftist leaning, who refused to change sides were accused of subversive activities and mostly imprisoned. Right-leaning Papuan elites then went on to set up Gerakan Persatuan Nieuw Guinea (GPNG), or New Guinea Unity Movement, in a number of towns throughout the island. The program of the GPNG was essentially, repudiation of the Indonesian claim and support of the Netherlands administration.

Between 1950 and 1953, the Netherlands and Indonesia tried to resolve the dispute through bilateral negotiations, conflicts arose because by the end of 1950, federal government structure collapsed and taken over by republican government which means The Netherlands had less say in Indonesian affairs. The Netherlands refused to follow on New Guinea provision of Round Table agreement as it was considered void after this change. These negotiations were unsuccessful and led the two governments to harden their position. On 15 February 1952, the Dutch Parliament voted to incorporate New Guinea into the realm of the Netherlands. After that, the Netherlands refused further discussion on the question of sovereignty and considered the issue to be closed. In response, President Sukarno adopted a more forceful stance towards the Dutch. Initially, he unsuccessfully tried to force the Indonesian government to formally abrogate the Round Table agreements and to adopt economic sanctions but was rebuffed by the Natsir Cabinet. Undeterred by this setback, Sukarno made recovering West Irian an important priority of his presidency and sought to harness popular support from the Indonesian public for this goal throughout many of his speeches between 1951 and 1952.

In New Guinea, while the activities of PKII and KIM associated groups were greatly diminished after most of their leaderships was captured under subversive law, some successors groups still exist and fighting for integration with Indonesia. In Hollandia 1951, some Papuan from Western part of New Guinea founded the Partai Indonesia Islam, the party was fiercely against Dutch authorities and as a result was imprisoned and given sentences of 12 years. Another wave of arrest happened on 3 February 1952, this time group led by Simon Jentara who intended for advocating Western New Guinea integration with Indonesia. On 2 May 1950, RIS court release a decision to free King of Sekar, Machmud Singgirei Rumagesan who went on to lead Gerakan Tjendrawasih Revolusioner Irian Barat (GTRIB) in 1953, and in that year, there were 2 revolts against Dutch New Guinea Government, one from around his kingdom regions, led by Abutalib bin Paris from Kokas, and on 10 October 1953, from Waris district.

By 1953, the dispute had become the central issue in Indonesian domestic politics. All political parties across the Indonesian political spectrum, particularly the Indonesian Communist Party (PKI), supported Sukarno's efforts to integrate West Irian into Indonesia. According to the historians Audrey and George McTurnan Kahin, the PKI's pro-integration stance helped the party to rebuild its political base and to further its credentials as a nationalist Communist Party that supported Sukarno. In the same year, during visit of the Netherlands Parliamentary mission, petitions were received from GPNG leaders in Hollandia, Biak, and Manokwari. In addition to the usual expressions of loyalty these petitions voiced a strong desire for more education. Although local resentments over land disputes with Eurasian settlers brought by Dutch authorities were also expressed. A Protestant labor organization, the Christelijk Werknemers Verbond Nieuw-Guinea-Perserikatan Sekerdia Kristen di Nieuw-Guinea (CWNG-Persekding) was founded in 1952. At that time, the salaries of Dutch officials and the fate of Eurasian contract workers were its main concern. It gradually developed specific Papuan welfare interests and became active in the educational field. Associated kaum ibu (women's clubs) were organized and mainly fought for modern labor legislation. Membership, especially the Papuan, increased rapidly after 1957 and reached over 3,000 by 1960. Many of these Papuan members would go on to join National Party (Parna) advocating for Papuan independence, although over time, some members like E.J. Bonay and Frits Kirihio of Parna, advocated working with Indonesia with Parna becoming branch of Partai Nasional Indonesia (PNI) led by Herman Wayoi. This was in opposition with Kena U Embay, formed later on, who claimed Parna only advocated for position in bureaucracy and criticised Kirihio as 'Papuan Hitler', and advocated for union with Netherlands.

=== Early Indonesian incursions ===
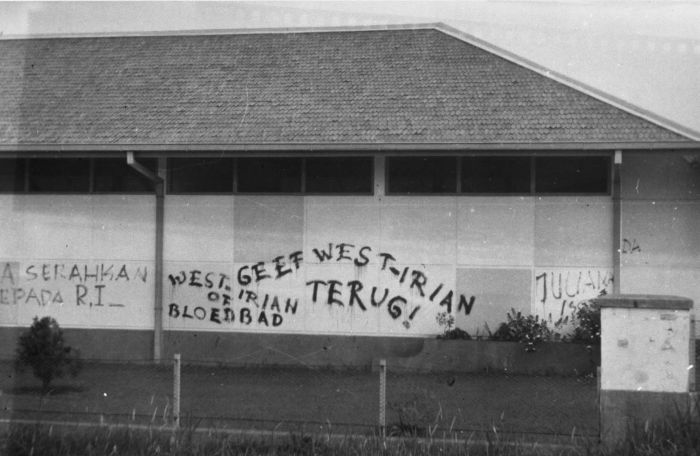
Graffiti against the presence of the Netherlands in West Irian.

At the urging of President Sukarno, Prime Minister Ali Sastroamidjojo began authorising limited incursions into West New Guinea in 1952. However, these early incursions were militarily unsuccessful, and Indonesia did not launch any more military operations until 1960. According to Ken Conboy, the first incursions were 'amateurish', the first infiltration of Gag Island in 1952 led to the arrest of the infiltrators within days. A second infiltration attempt one year later in 1953, this time directed at Kaimana, in like manner was promptly contained and the infiltrators arrested. A third infiltration attempt in Etna Bay 1954 was a more serious affair, a well-armed party of 42 infiltrators led by Johannes Abraham Dimara were able to abduct the Dutch police officer Sergeant van Krieken back to Indonesian territory. The infiltration force was engaged by Dutch marines, resulting in eleven Indonesian casualties and the capture of the remaining Indonesian forces, the Indonesian government reluctantly accepted it could not mount a credible military challenge against the Dutch in West New Guinea, and it was not until 1960 that Indonesia would again test the Dutch military position in West New Guinea. Alongside this the Dutch authorities began capturing Papuan youths members of Organisasi Pembebasan Irian (OPI) from Sorong branch, as Dimara was a former chairman in 1950, he was exiled to Digul until 1960.

In Digul Prison, an organization called Untuk Pembebasan Irian (UPI) was formed in 1955 led by Benyamin Felubun, under the advice of Johannes Abraham Dimara, this organization then spread to other location including in Okaba led by C. Tamnge, in Muting, Merauke led by Yan Kameubun, and in Mimika led by L. Renwarin. Mimika branch was mainly composed of many teachers from Kei Islands who was assigned in this area under Dutch administration and also work against RMS operatives in the area. By February 1960, UPI was transformed to Persatuan Semangat Pemuda 1945 (PSP-45). This organization memberships mainly work in intelligence in conjunction with Indonesian intelligence operatives and were trained and equipped to contact infiltration by Indonesia forces at later dates. In August 1960, Dutch authorities would capture 19 members of PSP-45 including its leaders, they would only be released on 15 October 1962 under UNTEA.

=== United Nations involvement ===
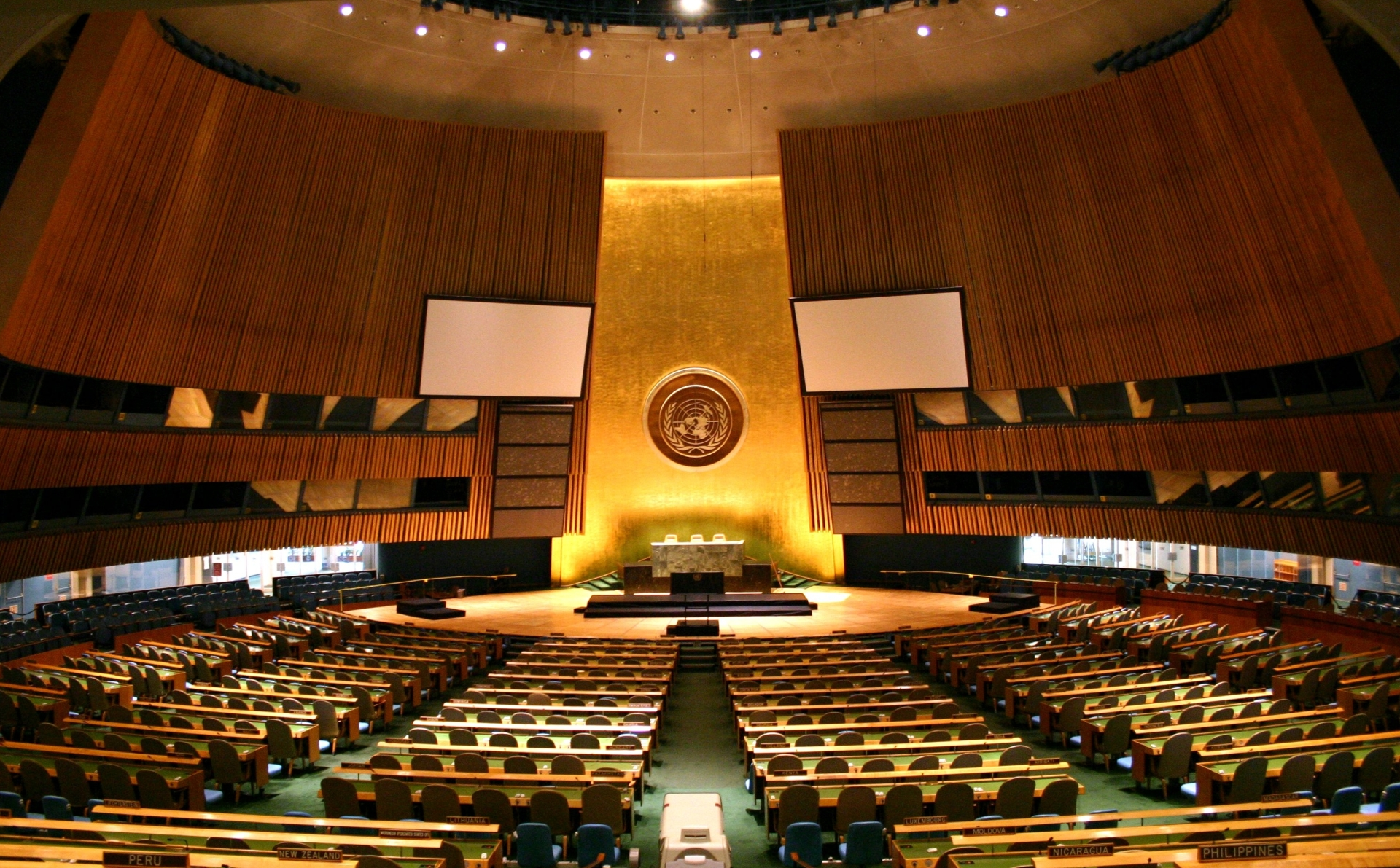
Indonesia referred the dispute to the United Nations in 1954

In 1954, Indonesia decided to take the dispute to the United Nations and succeeded in having it placed on the agenda for the upcoming ninth session of the United Nations General Assembly (UNGA). In response, the Dutch Ambassador to the United Nations, Herman van Roijen, warned that the Netherlands would ignore any recommendations which might be made by the UN regarding the dispute. During the Bandung Conference in April 1955, Indonesia succeeded in securing a resolution supporting its claim to West New Guinea from the Afro-Asian countries. Besides the Afro-Asian countries, Indonesia was also supported by the Soviet Union and its Warsaw Pact allies.

Meanwhile, the Netherlands' stance was supported by the United States, the United Kingdom, Australia, New Zealand, and several Western European and Latin American countries. However, these countries were unwilling to commit to providing military support to the Netherlands in the event of a conflict with Indonesia. The Eisenhower Administration was open to non-violent territorial changes but rejected the use of any military means to resolve the dispute. Until 1961, the U.S. pursued a policy of strict neutrality and abstained on every vote on the dispute. According to the historian Nicholas Tarling, the United Kingdom government took the position that it was "strategically undesirable" for control of the territory to pass to Indonesia because it created a precedent for encouraging territorial changes based on political prestige and geographical proximity.

The Australian Menzies Government welcomed the Dutch presence in West New Guinea as an "essential link" in its national defence since it also administrated a trust territory in the eastern half of New Guinea. Unlike its Labor Party successor which had supported the Indonesian nationalists, Prime Minister Robert Menzies viewed Indonesia as a potential threat to its national security and distrusted the Indonesian leadership for supporting the Japanese during World War II. In addition, New Zealand and South African governments also opposed the Indonesian claim to West New Guinea. The New Zealand government accepted the Dutch argument that the Papuans were culturally different from the Indonesians and thus supported maintaining Dutch sovereignty over the territory until the Papuans were ready for self-rule. By contrast, newly independent India, another Commonwealth member supported Indonesia's claim to West New Guinea.

Between 1954 and 1957, Indonesia and their Afro-Asian allies made three attempts to get the United Nations to intervene in the dispute. However, all these three resolutions failed to gain a two–thirds majority in the United Nations General Assembly. On 30 November 1954, the Indian representative Krishna Menon initiated a resolution calling for the Indonesians and Dutch to resume negotiations and to report to the 10th UNGA Session. This resolution was sponsored by eight countries (Argentina, Costa Rica, Cuba, Ecuador, El Salvador, India, Syria, and Yugoslavia) but failed to secure a two-thirds majority (34-23-3). In response to growing tensions between Jakarta and the Hague, the Indonesian government unilaterally dissolved the Netherlands-Indonesian Union on 13 February 1956, and also rescinded compensation claims to the Dutch. Undeterred by this setback, Indonesia resubmitted the West New Guinea issue to the UNGA's agenda in November 1956.

On 23 February 1957, a thirteen country–sponsored resolution (Bolivia, Burma, Ceylon, Costa Rica, Ecuador, India, Iraq, Pakistan, Saudi Arabia, Sudan, Syria, and Yugoslavia) calling for the United Nations to appoint a "good offices commission" for West New Guinea was submitted to the UN General Assembly. Despite receiving a plural majority (40-25-13), this second resolution failed to gain a two-thirds majority. Undeterred, the Afro-Asian caucus in the United Nations lobbied for the dispute to be included on the UNGA's agenda. On 4 October 1957, the Indonesian Foreign Minister Subandrio warned that Indonesia would embark on "another cause" if the United Nations failed to bring about a solution to the dispute that favoured Indonesia. That month, the Indonesian Communist Party and affiliated trade unions lobbied for retaliatory economic measures against the Dutch. On 26 November 1957, a third Indonesian resolution was put to the vote but failed to gain a two-thirds majority (41-29-11). In response, Indonesia took retaliatory measure against Dutch interests in Indonesia.

=== Escalating tensions ===
The Morning Star flag was part of Dutch attempts to encourage a West Papuan identity

In 1956, Papuan youths from Fakfak revolted and managed to burn a couple of police stations and stole some guns. In response of the capture of PPI and OPI leaderships in Sorong, OPI began to be led by Bastian Samori, Yulius Worabay, Lodewijk Wosiri, Bob Warinusi, and Elias Paprindey. On 3 November 1956, this movement which consisted of 300 people planned a sabotage to blow up oil tank in Sorong. However the plan was foiled by the Dutch authority and they managed to capture E. Paprindey, Elimelek Ayoni and Franky Kossa in November 1959.

Multiple fierce fighting happened in Enarotali, between 1952 and 1954, the area around Wissel Lakes were the center of a messianic movement called Wege. It was centered around the believe of Ratu Adil from Java would come and found kingdom of happiness which was based on a local folktale of Situgumina which travel to the west, in the direction of Java, and will return again to bring secret of life and death and wealth, as a result the Ekari should prepare for their arrival. The local people would begin the preparation by setting up barracks in the middle of forest and participated in ceremony for weeks. The leader of this movement was Zacheus Pakage, a former priest from Bomou which had studied in Makassar; he was captured and imprisoned in mid 1954, only freed in 1962. Another incident happened in Obano, 3 November 1956 when a missionary Cessna plane was burned by Ekaris which resulted in Dutch retaliations.

In August 1957, a couple of Dutch policemen were killed, around the area of Wissel Lakes, and the second incidents happened in 1959. These events were known as "Enarotali Incidents". On 6 July 1959, several former Japanese weapons were confiscated from the local people in Genyem, near Hollandia. However this led to revolt and Dutch police and marine units were sent to quell the revolt. Simultaneously with this event, a rebellion with messianic movement roots also erupted near the region of Asmat. This movement began in 1956, which invited brutal retaliation by Dutch colonial authority and around 700 would be killed in Ayan village. Another revolt would begin in 1958–1959, when Dutch authority would deploy HNLMS Piet Hein and resulted in around 1,000 deaths in Agats. These events would be known as "Agats Incident".

In 1960, successive rebellions happened, specifically in Kokas, Fakfak, in August and December 1960 which was led by Lapadanga and many of the perpetrators, were captured and exiled to Digul. Then in November 1960, approximately 25 Papuan youths in Merauke were arrested by the Dutch for holding a movement against the Dutch government. In Hollandia (now Jayapura) there was also a fierce rebellion in the same year and is better known as the "Baliem Valley Incident." In suppressing this multiple rebellions, the Dutch authorities acted with brutality, inviting protests from the Dutch public, and local populations.

In Biak, there were also numerous arrests, including a teacher named Petrus Wettebessy who was arrested for his activities against the Dutch leading the Party for Irian Inside the United States of Indonesia (Partai Irian Dalam Republik Indonesia Serikat, PIDRIS) alongside Corinus Krey and the party's deputy leader, Marthen Indey who was arrested separately in Ambon. Then in December there was a rebellion between school children and teachers because of the arbitrary actions of a Dutch official against a Papuan youths. In Sorong, another incident happened involving members of OPI under the leadership of Bastian Samori, he was finally arrested and imprisoned by the Dutch authorities.

After the defeat of the third Afro-Asian resolution in November 1957, the Indonesian government embarked on a national campaign targeting Dutch interests in Indonesia; leading to the withdrawal of the Dutch flag carrier KLM's landing rights, mass demonstrations and worker strikes in Dutch-owned companies, and the seizure of the Dutch shipping line KPM, BPM, Borsumij, Dutch-owned banks, and other estates. A total of 700 Dutch-owned companies with a valuation total of around $1.5 billion was nationalised. By January 1958, ten thousand Dutch nationals had left Indonesia, many returning to the Netherlands. This spontaneous nationalisation had adverse repercussions on the Indonesian economy, disrupting communications and affecting the production of exports. President Sukarno also abandoned efforts to raise the dispute at the 1958 United Nations General Assembly, claiming that reason and persuasion had failed. By June 1960, around thirteen thousand Dutch nationals mostly Eurasians from New Guinea left for Australia, with around a thousand move to the Netherlands. Following a sustained period of harassment against Dutch diplomatic representatives in Jakarta, the Indonesian government formally severed relations with the Netherlands in August 1960.

In response to Indonesian aggression and facing local pressure, the Netherlands government stepped up its efforts to prepare the Papuan people for self-determination in 1959. These efforts culminated in the establishment of a new hospital in Hollandia (currently RSUD Jayapura), a shipyard in Manokwari, agricultural research sites, plantations, and a military force known as the Papuan Volunteer Corps. By the end of 1960, a legislative New Guinea Council had been established with a mixture of legislative, advisory and policy functions had been established. Half of its members were to be elected, and elections for this council were held the following year.

These include setting up of local political parties, Those parties were: National Party (Partai Nasional, Parna) led by Herman Wayoi, Democratic People's Party (Democratische Volks Partij, DVP) led by A. Runtuboy, Kena U Embay (KUD) led by Essau Itaar, National Party of Papua (Nasional Partai Papua, Nappa), Independent Papua Party (Partai Papua Merdeka, PPM) led by Mozes Rumainum, Papua National Committee (Committee Nasional Papua, CNP) led by Willem Inury, Papuan National Front (Front Nasional Papua, FNP) led by Lodewijk Ayamiseba, New Guinean Party (Partai Orang Nieuw Guinea, PONG) led by Johan Ariks, New Guinea Unity Party (Eenheidspartij Nieuw Guinea, EPANG) led by Lodewijk Mandatjan, Party of Equal Human (Sama-Sama Manusia, SSM), Christian-Islam Union of Radja Ampat (Persatuan Christen Islam Radja Ampat, Perchisra) led by M.N. Majalibit, and Association of Papuan Youths (Persatuan Pemuda-Pemudi Papua, PERPEP) led by A.J.F. Marey. The Dutch also sought to create a sense of West Papuan national identity, and these efforts led to the creation of a national flag (the Morning Star flag), a national anthem, and a coat of arms. The Dutch had planned to transfer independence to West New Guinea in 1970. Exclusion in the New Guinea Council were parties and movements which openly supported Papuan integration with Indonesia, like KIM, PKII, Independence Fighter Association of West Irian (Persatuan Pedjuang Kemerdekaan Irian Barat, PPKI) led by J. Dimara and I. Kilikulat, Irian Indonesian Youth Organization (Organisasi Pemuda Indonesia Irian, OPII) led by N.C. Krey, PPI led by S.K. Tumengkol, Irian Youth Organization (Organisasi Pemuda Irian, OPI) led by D. Wosiri, Indonesian Independence Party (Partai Kemerdekaan Indonesia, PKI) led by Tan Tjung Ek, PIN, Islamic Indonesian Party (Partai Indonesia Islam), GMP, Indonesian Youth Movement (Gerakan Pemuda Indonesia, GPI) led by Rumbewas, and West Irian People's Movement (Gerakan Rakyat Irian Barat, GRIB).

In 1962, GRIB staged a protest openly demanded that West Irian be returned to Indonesia during Dutch minister Bost visit to Fakfak. Aside from Papuan revolting in New Guinea, multiple Papuan individuals evade capture and fled to Indonesia, with some joining Cendrawasih Battalion, like Corinus Krey, A. Koromath, A.B. Karubuy, A.L.Maranni, N.L. Suages, Lt. Henkie Antaribaba, Lt. Ramandey, H.L. Rumaseuw, Lt. Wanggai, Lt. Numberi, and others who would become leaders for military infiltration during Operation Trikora. Other figures that received military training included AJ. Dimara, Benny Torey, Marinus Imbury, Zadrack Rumbobiar, Melkianus Torey, and Metusalim Fimbay. While others joined Indonesian diplomatic delegations, which include: M. Indey, Frits Kiriheo, J.A. Dimara, alongside S. Papare who had been living in Indonesian territories. Although no exact number of escapees from 1949 to 1961 was known, Yayasan Badan Kontak Keluarga Besar Perintis Irian Barat (Foundation for Irian Barat Veterans), listed 154 notable Indonesian nationalists from all over Papua, with most fled during 1959–1961.

=== Renewed diplomacy ===
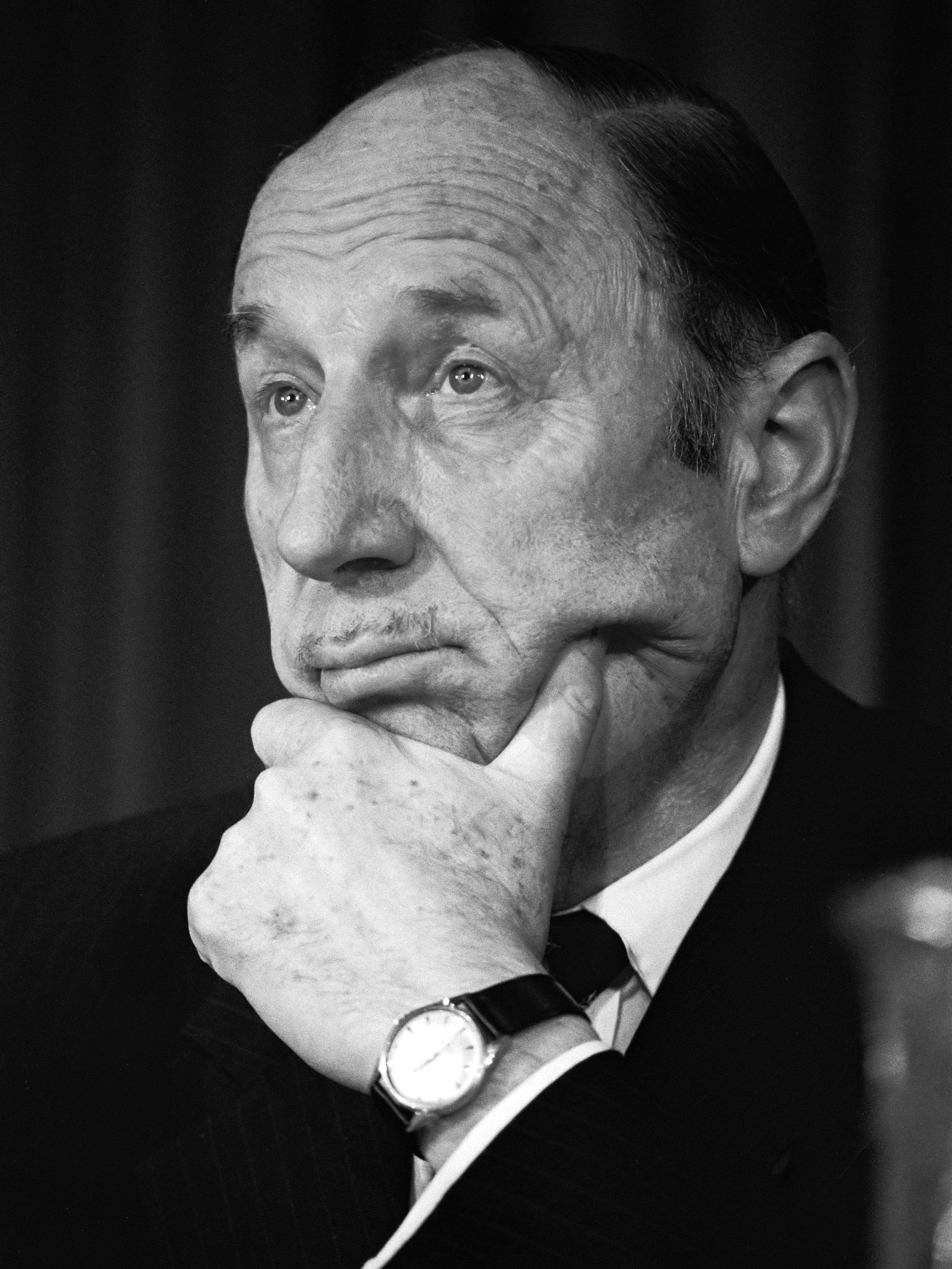
Joseph Luns, the Dutch Foreign Minister at the time.

By 1960, other countries in the Asia-Pacific region had taken notice of the West Irian dispute and began proposing initiatives to end the dispute. During a visit to the Netherlands, the New Zealand Prime Minister Walter Nash suggested the idea of a united New Guinea state, consisting of both Dutch and Australian territories. This idea received little support from both Indonesia and other Western governments. Later that year, the Malayan Prime Minister Tunku Abdul Rahman proposed a three-step initiative, which involved West New Guinea coming under United Nations trusteeship. The joint administrators would be three non-aligned nations Ceylon, India, and Malaya, which supported Indonesia's position on West Irian. This solution involved the two belligerents, Indonesia and the Netherlands, re-establishing bilateral relations and the return of Dutch assets and investments to their owners. However, this initiative was scuttled in April 1961 due to opposition from the Indonesian Foreign Minister Subandrio, who publicly attacked the Tunku's proposal.

By 1961, the Netherlands government was struggling to find adequate international support for its policy to prepare West New Guinea for independent status under Dutch guidance. While the Netherlands' traditional Western allies—the United States, Great Britain, Australia, and New Zealand—were sympathetic to Dutch policy, they were unwilling to provide any military support in the event of a conflict with Indonesia. On 26 September 1961, the Dutch Foreign Minister Joseph Luns offered to hand over West New Guinea to a United Nations trusteeship. This proposal was firmly rejected by his Indonesian counterpart Subandrio, who likened the West New Guinea dispute to Katanga's attempted secession from the Republic of Congo during the Congo Crisis. By October 1961, Britain was open to transferring West New Guinea to Indonesia while the U.S. floated the idea of a jointly-administered trusteeship over the territory.

On 23 November 1961, the Indian delegation at the United Nations presented a draft resolution calling for the resumption of Dutch–Indonesian talks on terms which favoured Indonesia. On 25 November 1961, several Francophone African countries tabled a rival resolution which favoured an independent West New Guinea. Indonesia favoured the Indian resolution while the Netherlands, Britain, Australia, and New Zealand supported the Francophone African resolution. On 27 November 1961, both the Francophone African (52-41-9) and Indian (41-40-21) resolutions were put to the vote failed to gain a two–thirds majority at the United Nations General Assembly. The failure of this final round of diplomacy in the UN convinced Indonesia to prepare for a military invasion of West Irian.

== The military dimension, 1959–1962 ==
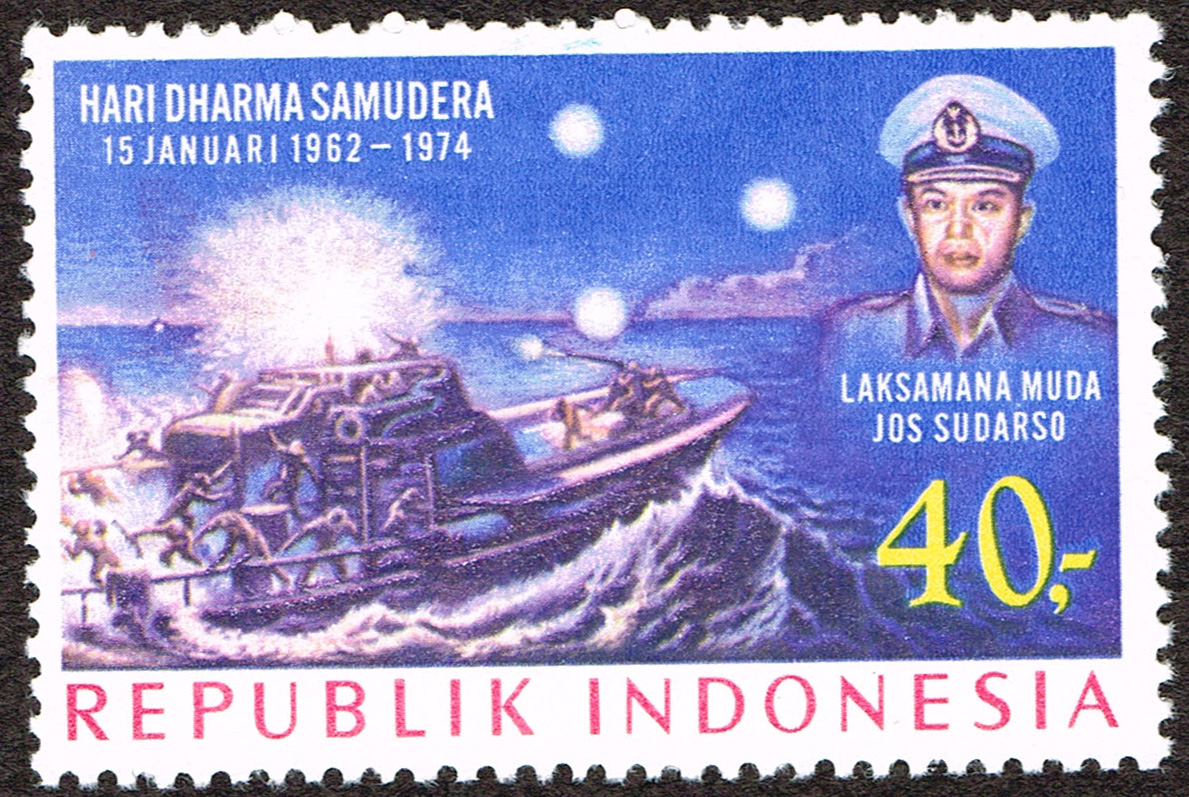
Indonesian stamp commemorating the Vlakke Hokke incident

=== Indonesian-Soviet rapprochement ===
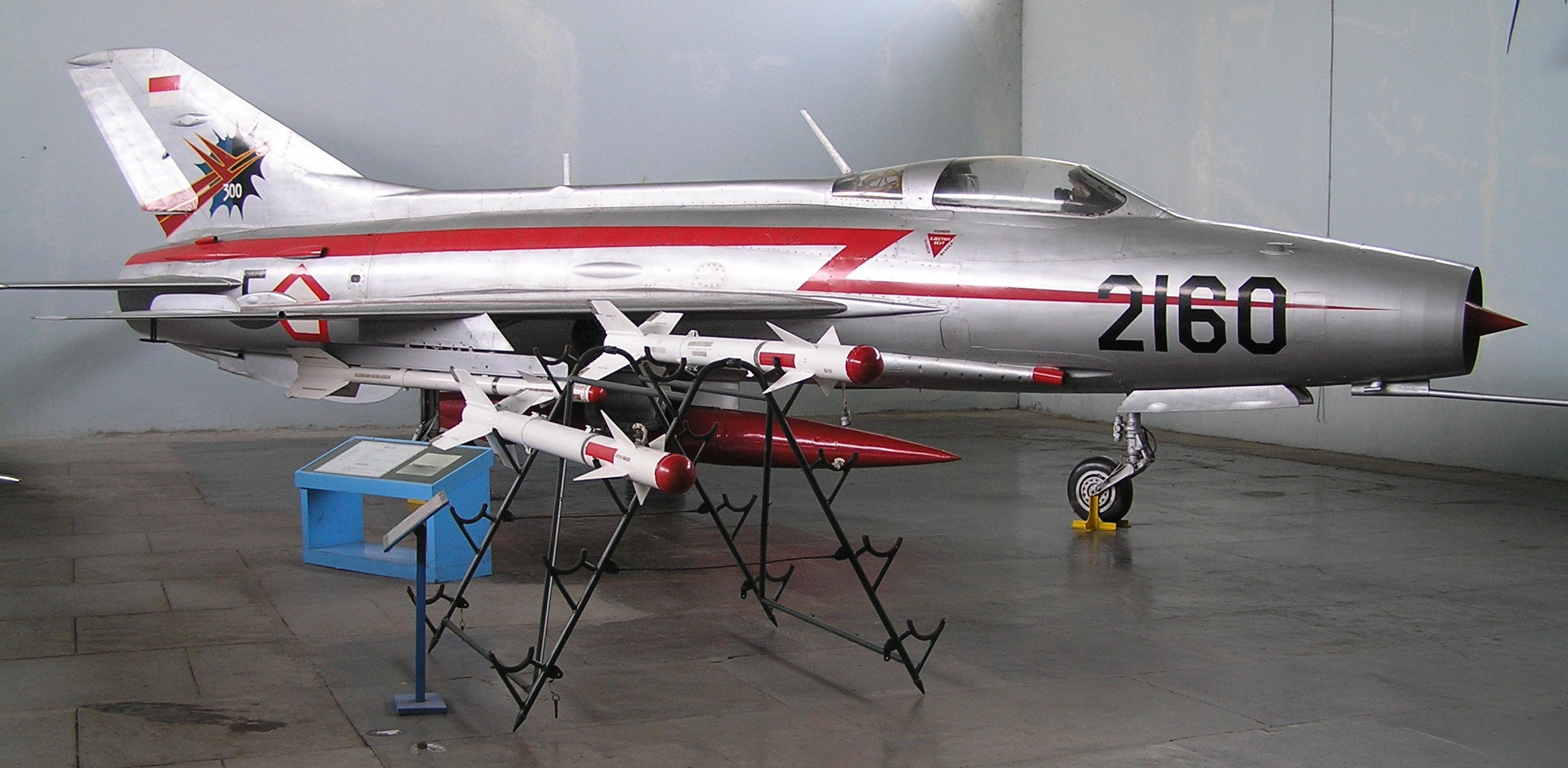
Indonesia received significant amounts of Soviet military aid, including this MiG-21 fighter jet.

As the dispute began to escalate, Sukarno also developed closer relations with the Soviet Union, which shared Indonesia's anti-colonial outlook. In July 1959, the Indonesian government adopted a policy of Confrontation (Konfrontasi) against the Dutch. According to the Indonesian political scientist J. Soedjati Djiwandono, Indonesia's Confrontation policy involved the use of political, economic, and military force to induce an opponent to reach a diplomatic solution on Indonesian terms. Later that year, the Soviet government decided to supply warships and other military hardware directly to the Indonesians. By 1965, the Indonesian Navy had grown to 103 combat vessels and other auxiliaries (including a cruiser, twelve submarines, and sixteen destroyers and frigates). Due to Soviet military aid, the Indonesian Navy became the second most potent force in East Asia after China. The Indonesian Air Force also benefited from an infusion of Soviet military hardware and training, developing a long-range capability.

Bolstered by Soviet military weapons and equipment, Indonesia had begun to reconsider the viability of renewing military operations against Dutch forces in West New Guinea. On 9 November 1960, Indonesia launched a seaborne incursion into the territory, but this operation proved to be a failure. Of the twenty-three infiltrators, seven were killed, and the remaining sixteen were captured within four months. On 14 September 1961, a new infiltration attempt was launched, but once again the infiltration party was promptly intercepted and defeated by Dutch forces.

=== Operation Trikora ===
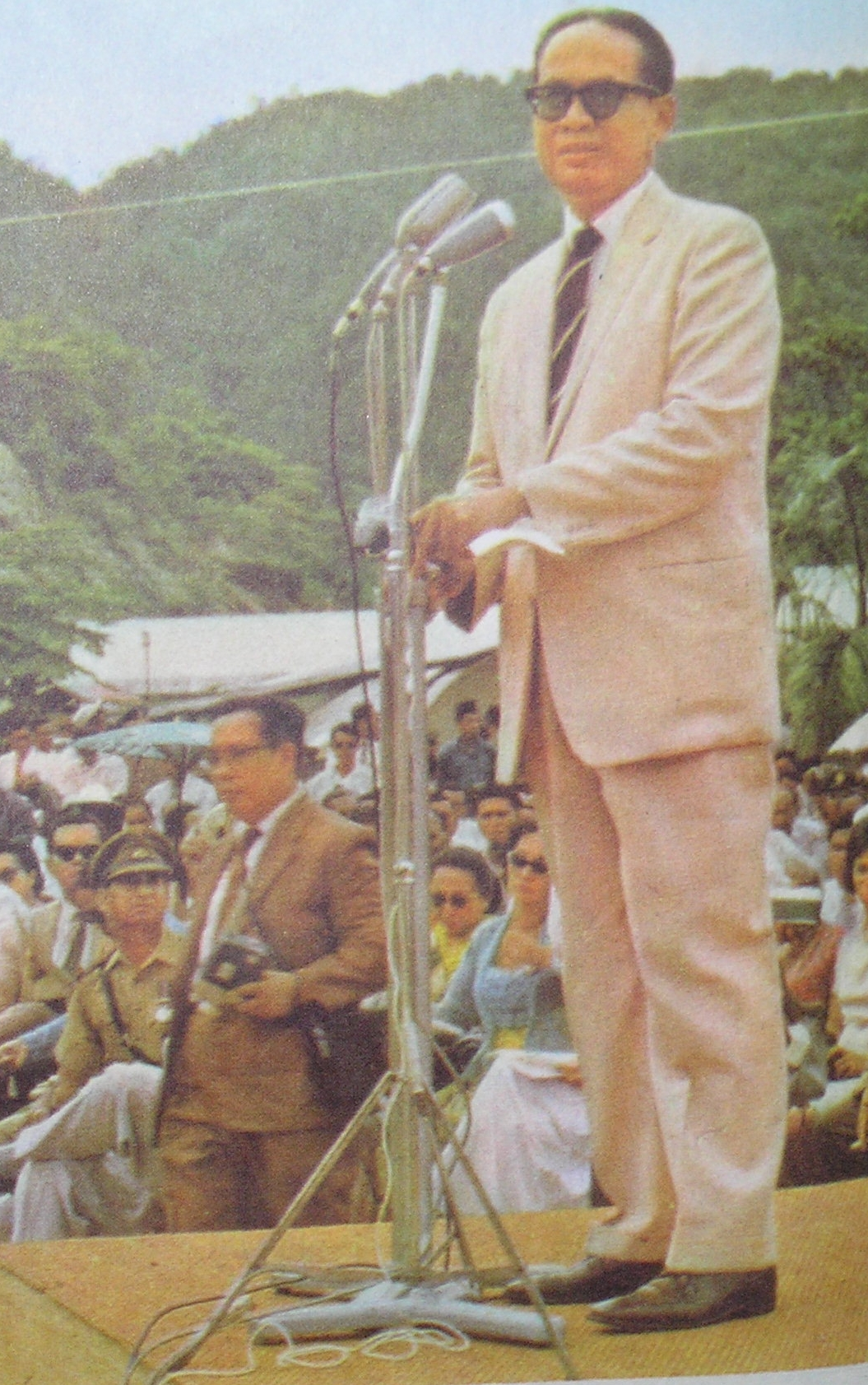
The Indonesian Foreign Minister Subandrio at the ceremonies marking the transfer of the territory to Indonesian control on 1 May 1963

Following the failure of diplomacy in the United Nations and persisted Dutch efforts to prepare the West Papuans for self-rule, Indonesia's Confrontation against the Dutch in West New Guinea reached a new crescendo. On 19 December 1961, President Sukarno gave orders for the Indonesian military to prepare for a full–scale military invasion of the territory; codenamed Operation Trikora. He also ordered the creation of a special People's Triple Command or Tri Komando Rakyat (Trikora) with the objective of 'liberating' West New Guinea by 1 January 1963. Trikora's operational command was to be called the Mandala Command for the Liberation of West Irian (Komando Mandala Pembebasan Irian Barat) and was led by Major-General Suharto, the future President of Indonesia. In preparation for the planned invasion, the Mandala command began making land, air, and sea incursions into West Irian. General Suharto also planned to launch a full-scale amphibious operation invasion of West Irian known as Operation Jayawijaya (or Operation Djajawidjaja).

In response to Indonesian aggression, the Netherlands increased its military presence and intelligence-gathering efforts in West New Guinea. Since 15 April 1954, the Royal Netherlands Navy had been responsible for the territorial defence of West New Guinea. A signals intelligence agency known as Marid 6 Netherlands New Guinea (NNG) was also established in April 1955 to provide the Netherlands New Guinea authorities with intelligence on Indonesian intentions towards West Irian. One of Marid 6 NNG's successes was providing early warning of Indonesian plans to seize all KPM ships and facilities in December 1957. This enabled the Dutch authorities to evacuate 45 of these 83 ships. Later, Marid 6 NNG helped Dutch naval units to recapture the KPM ships. In 1962, the Royal Netherlands Navy deployed a sizeable naval task group including the aircraft carrier HNLMS Karel Doorman to West New Guinea.

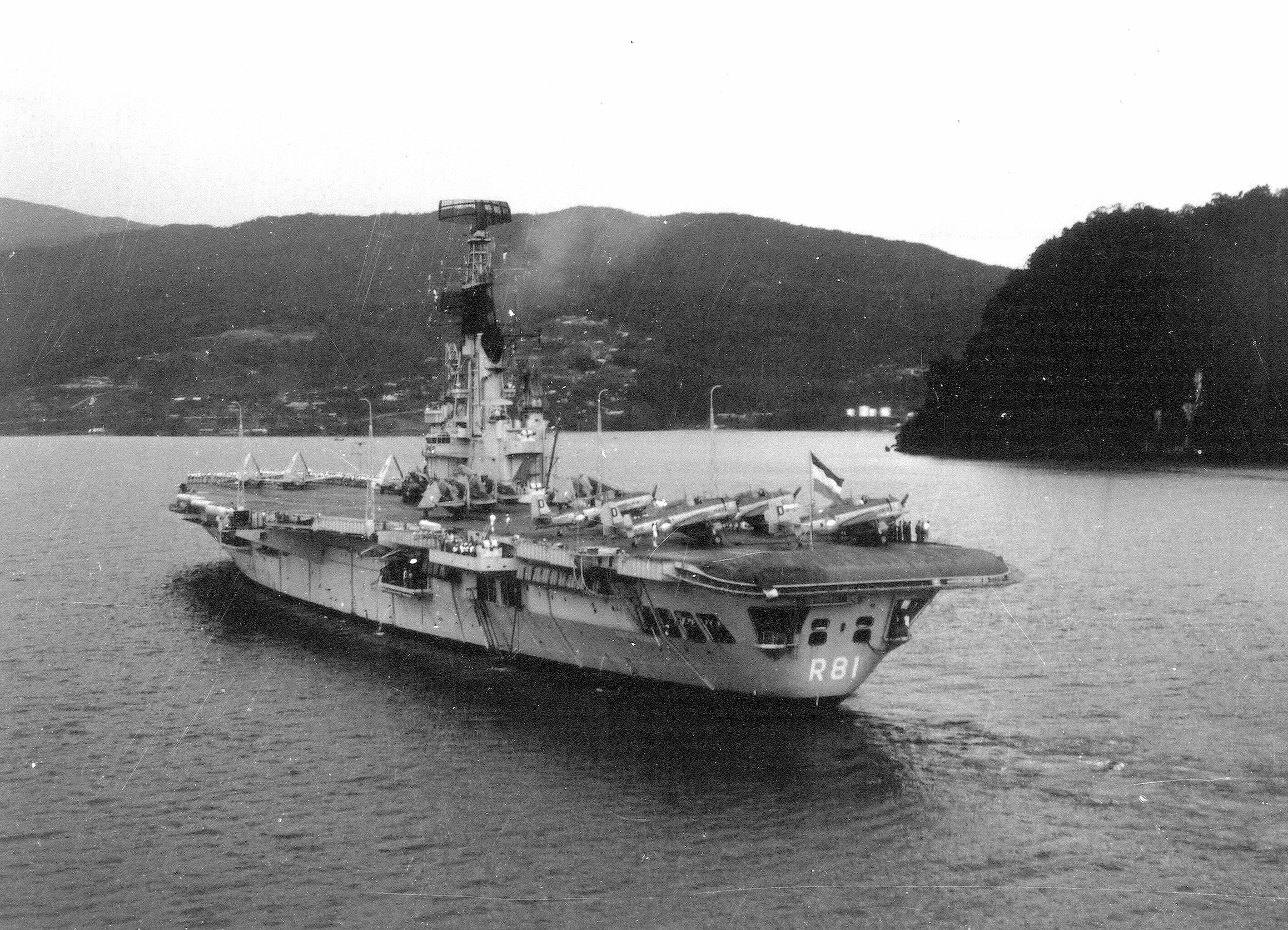
Dutch aircraft carrier Karel Doorman deployed to New Guinea in 1960.

On 15 January 1962, the Indonesian Navy attempted to land a force of 150 marines near Vlakke Hoek, on West Irian's south coast. The Indonesians had intended to raise the Indonesian flag on Dutch territory to weaken the Netherlands position during the ongoing negotiations in New York. However, Marid 6 NNG managed to intercept Indonesian radio messages and learned about the Indonesian plans. In response, the Dutch authorities deployed a Lockheed Neptune patrol aircraft and three destroyers to intercept the three Indonesian motor torpedo-boats (the fourth boat had experienced engine trouble and did not participate). During the ensuing Vlakke Hoek incident, one of the Indonesian torpedo boats was sunk, while the remaining two boats were forced to retreat. The operation ended disastrously for Indonesia, with many crew members and embarked marines being killed and 55 survivors taken prisoner. Among the casualties was Commodore Yos Sudarso, the deputy chief of the Indonesian Navy Staff.

On 24 June 1962, four Indonesian Air Force C-130 Hercules aircraft dropped 213 paratroopers near Merauke. Throughout the year, a total of 1,200 Indonesian paratroopers and 340 naval infiltrators landed in West New Guinea. By mid-1962, the Indonesian military had begun preparations to launch Operation Jayawijaya around August 1962. This operation was to be carried out in four phases and would have involved joint air and naval strikes against Dutch airfields, paratroop and amphibious landings at Biak and Sentani, and a ground assault on the territory's capital Hollandia. Unknown to the Indonesians, Marid 6 NNG had intercepted Indonesian transmissions and obtained intelligence on Indonesian battle plans. However, a ceasefire agreement known as the New York Agreement, which facilitated the transfer of West New Guinea to Indonesia control by 1963, was signed by the Dutch and Indonesians on 15 August 1962. As a result, the Trikora Command cancelled Operation Jayawijaya on 17 August 1962.

== Resolution ==
=== The New York Agreement ===
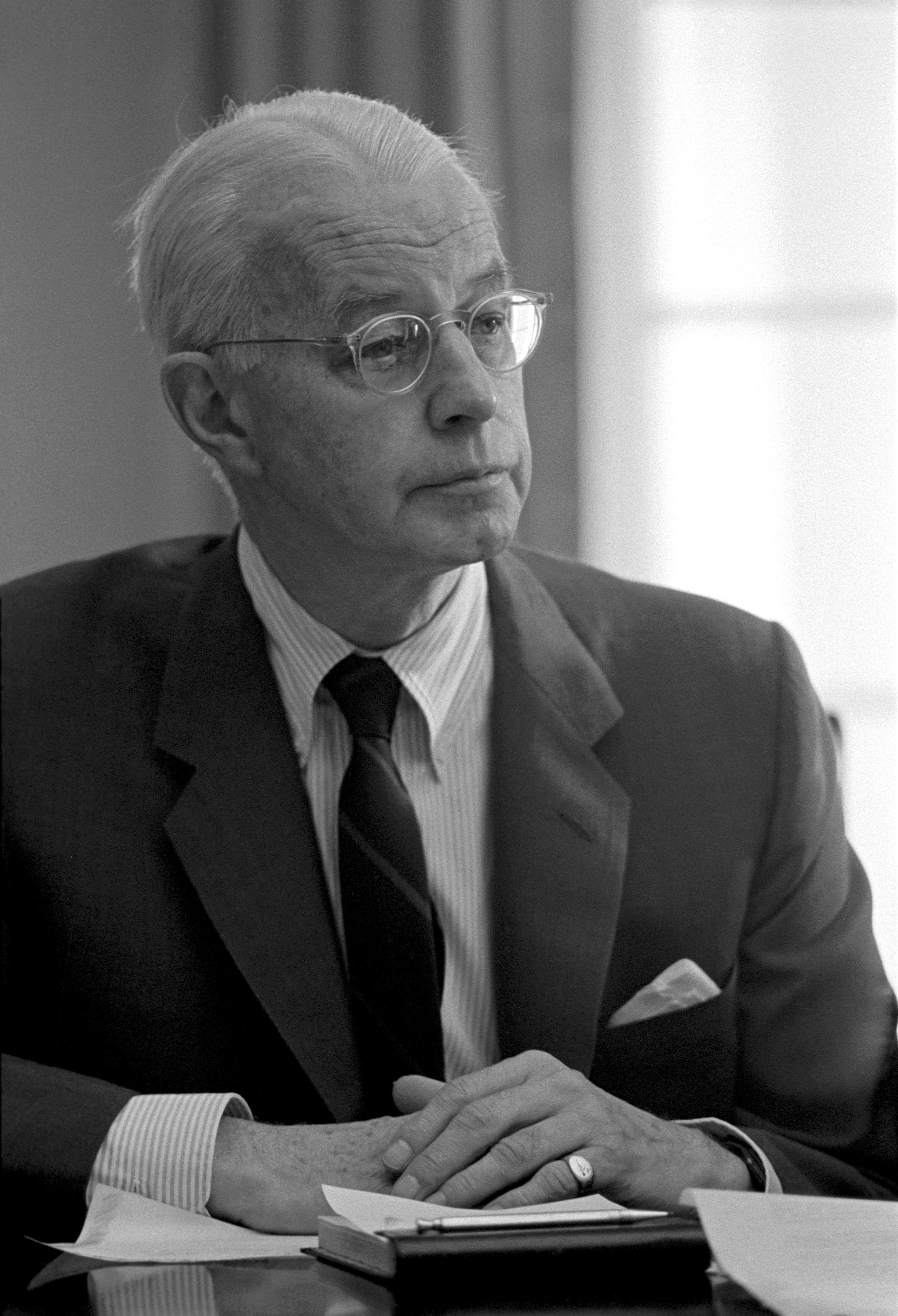
Ellsworth Bunker, who brokered the New York Agreement

By 1961, the United States government had become concerned about the Indonesian military's purchase of Soviet weapons and equipment for a planned invasion of West New Guinea. The Kennedy Administration feared an Indonesian drift towards communism and wanted to court Sukarno to draw him away from the Soviet bloc and Communist China. The U.S. government also wanted to repair relations with Jakarta, which had deteriorated due to the Eisenhower Administration's covert support for the Permesta/PRRI regional uprisings in Sumatra and Sulawesi. These factors convinced the Kennedy Administration to intervene diplomatically to bring about a peaceful solution to the dispute that favoured Indonesia.

Throughout 1962, the U.S. diplomat Ellsworth Bunker facilitated top–secret high–level negotiations between the Dutch and Indonesian governments. These protracted talks produced a peace settlement known as the New York Agreement on 15 August 1962. As a face-saving measure, the Dutch would hand over West New Guinea to a provisional United Nations Temporary Executive Authority (UNTEA) on 1 October 1962, which then ceded the territory to Indonesia on 1 May 1963; formally ending the dispute. As part of the New York Agreement, it was stipulated that a popular plebiscite would be held in 1969 to determine whether the Papuans would choose to remain in Indonesia or seek self-determination.

=== Legacy ===
While U.S. diplomacy averted the escalation of the dispute into a full–blown war between Indonesia and the Netherlands, Washington failed to win over President Sukarno. Buoyed by his success in the West New Guinea campaign, Sukarno turned his attention to the former British colony of Malaysia, resulting in the Indonesian-Malaysian Confrontation which induced deterioration of Indonesia's relations with the West. Ultimately, President Sukarno was overthrown during the Indonesian coup attempt of 1965 and subsequently replaced by the pro-Western Suharto. In addition, the U.S. mining company Freeport-McMoRan was interested in exploiting Western New Guinea's copper and gold deposits.

Following the Act of Free Choice plebiscite in 1969, Western New Guinea was formally integrated into the Republic of Indonesia. Instead of a referendum of the 816,000 Papuans, only 1,022 Papuan tribal representatives were allowed to vote, and they were coerced into voting in favour of integration. While several international observers including journalists and diplomats criticised the referendum as being rigged, the U.S. and Australia supported Indonesia's efforts to secure acceptance in the United Nations for the pro-integration vote. That same year, 84 member states voted in favour for the United Nations to accept the result, with 30 others abstaining.

A number of Papuans refused to accept the territory's integration into Indonesia, which anti-independence supporters and foreign observers attributed to the Netherlands' efforts to promote a West Papuan national identity among right-leaning Papuans and suppressed left-leaning Papuans pro-Indonesian sympathies. These formed the separatist Organisasi Papua Merdeka (Free Papua Movement) and have waged an insurgency against the Indonesian authorities, which continues to this day. In 2017, a petition smuggled and claimed to be signed by 1.8 million West Papuans (Note: This was claimed to be >70% of the population. According to Papua Province Office of the BPS in Papua Province in Figures 2018, the province in 2017 had a population of 3,265,202, meanwhile according to West Papua Province Office of the BPS in West Papua Province in Figures 2018, the province in 2017 had a population of 915,361, meaning the combined population of 4,180,563. If the petition were signed by 1.8 million people, that would mean 43% of the population.) was presented to the United Nations demanding a new independence referendum and a UN representative to investigate suspected human rights violations by Indonesian security forces. Signing of the petition was made illegal under threat of prison by Indonesian authorities. Australia continued to support Indonesia's sovereignty over West Papua, citing the Lombok treaty.

== See also ==
- Biak Massacre
- 1999 East Timorese crisis
