= Marthen Indey =

Indonesian National Hero

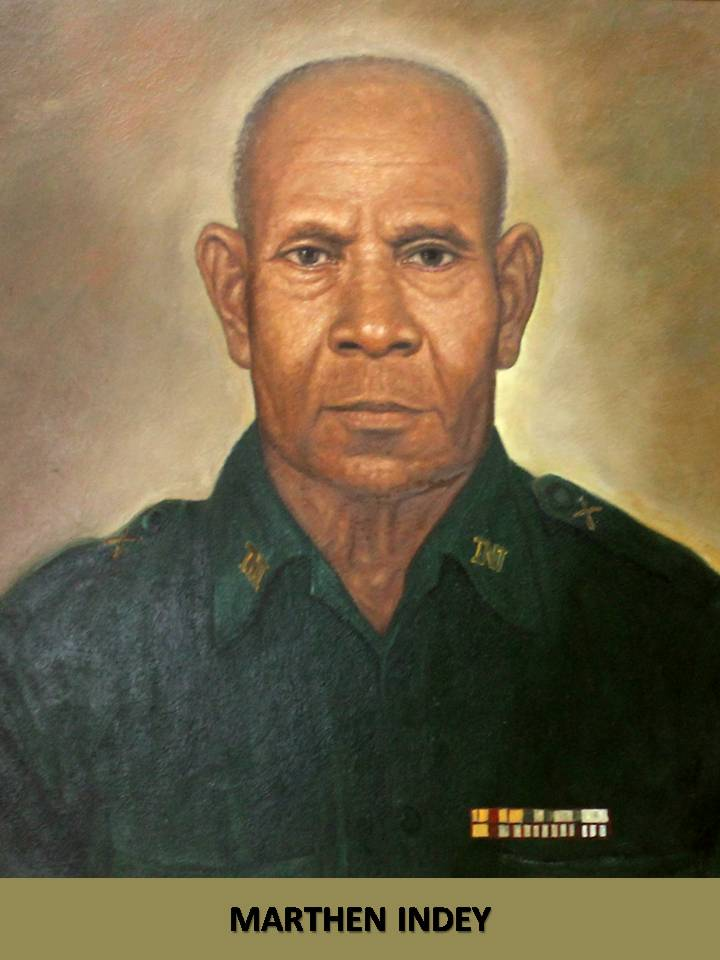
- Born: 16 March 1912; Doromena, Jayapura, Dutch East Indies
- Died: 17 July 1986 (aged 74); Doromena, Jayapura, Indonesia
- Burial place: Tomb of National Hero Marthen Indey, at Kampung Dosai, West Sentani
- Military career
- Allegiance: Dutch East Indies (1935–1945); Indonesia (1942–1983)
- Branch: Dutch East Indies Police; Netherlands Indies Civil Administration; Indonesian Army
- Service years: 1935–1983
- Rank: Klasse II Politieagent (1934); Tweede Posthuiscommandant (1941); Corporal (1944); Major (titular) (1963–1983)
- Conflicts: Battle of Leyte; New Guinea campaign; Indonesian National Revolution; West New Guinea dispute
- Awards: Bronze Cross; National Hero of Indonesia

Major TNI Marthen Indey (1912–1986) was a colonial police officer in New Guinea, Dutch East Indies who later became nationalist fighter in the Indonesian National Revolution and a supporter of Papua becoming part of Indonesia. He was declared a National Hero of Indonesia in 1993 along with two other people of Papuan descent, Frans Kaisiepo and Silas Papare.

== Biography ==
=== Early life ===
Marthen Indey was born in Doromena, Jayapura Regency, Netherlands New Guinea on 16 March 1912. His birth name was Soroway Indey, before he was baptized as Marthen (sometimes spelled Marthin or Martin). His father was an Ondoafi or traditional village leader named Indey, who later on was baptized as Habel. During his early life, he was greatly influenced by Johannes Bremer, an Ambonese missionary from Kampung Calalar who had been sent by the Dutch to spread Christianity in New Guinea; Marthen Indey, along with other children; Karel Indey, Ruban Mentanawai, Inkas Abisai, and Naomi Apiserai spent part of their childhood living in Ambon with Bremer's family after Bremer was replaced with A. Nanuilata.

Indey improved his command of the Malay language while a primary student in Volkschool in Ambon which he attended after his right index finger is able to reach touch the tip of the left ear when his right arm is over the head, a sign for the start of school age; at the time the language was not commonly spoken in many eastern parts of the Indies as compared to Java and Sumatra. Unlike his nephew Karel who went on to continue study in Depok and ODO (Opleiding Voor Dorpzonderwijzen) in Miei, Wandormen and become teacher in Hollandia, Indey was known as a rebellious and adventurous child which did not like education in classrooms. He also did not like the religious emphasis in reading, writing and singing, nevertheless he graduated from the district school in 1926, and subsequently enrolled in the native naval school in Makassar, the Kweekschool voor Indische Schepelingen (KTS), which he eventually graduated from in 1932. It was after his first actual service aboard a ship, the Zeven Provincien, that he abandoned the idea of a naval career and decided to become a police officer instead. Therefore, in June 1934 he enrolled in the police academy in Sukabumi, West Java; he completed his training there in 1935. In late 1935, he was sent to be a member of an Ambonese police detachment in his birthplace, New Guinea. During his time there he involved himself various Dutch campaigns to break the resistance of local Papuan tribes. One of these incidents was with Ayam tribe part of Asmat tribe which consisted of 2000 members, Ayam tribe repeatedly attacked Dutch position in Mimika. Indey solved this by becoming nude to go inside their village and discussed peaceful coexistence with local tribal leaders, and from these meetings it was agreed they will not attack Kakanao (Mimika). From this success, he was transferred to Manokwari in December 1935. He was involved in the opening of two new settlements in Waropen Atas, Mamberano Tengah, and Waropenkai (Demba). It was during this phase of his life that he met and married his wife, Agustina Heumasse, from Negeri Kamarian in Seram Island; their marriage took place in Manokwari. On 10 January 1937 he was transferred to Serui, from here he was involved in an expedition to set up post Bivak Pionier Memberamo with the boat Reger Patrouville, these activities in opening Memberamo village last until April 1938. During 1938–1940, he was involved in three expeditions from the northern coast of Napan (near Nabire) to the southern coast near Mimika. The first expedition was done in 1938 with J.P.K. Van Eechoed, as a result of these 8 months expedition he was given the recognition Trouw en Verdienste from Dutch authorities. The second expedition was with Police commissioner Van Krieken and C.A Harzen. Lastly the third expedition was in the beginning of 1940 to conduct feasibility study on building roads through the Paniai interior from Seruwo river to Wisselmer with a Dutch civil engineer from Makassar.

=== Wartime and anti-colonial struggle ===
During 1940 and 1941, Indey worked in the clandestine colonial police to track the movements of Japanese agents in Manokwari, who the Dutch believed to be scouting the region for an eventual invasion, disguised as fishermen and plantation workers. These plantation workers were working for a cotton plantation Nanyo Kohatsu Kabushiki Kaisha (NKKK) in Ransiki Manokwari, Nabire, and Wandamen Peninsula. While fishermen were working from the surrounding islands including Room, Meoswar, and Rumberpon. It was later found out that Japanese were preparing Manokwari as a base for their invasion. In the middle of NKKK plantation they found a secret runway, the Japanese also buried uniforms, ammunitions, grenades, small cannons, and machine guns during the night.

In 1941 Indey was moved to Ambon and later Tanah Merah, Digul as a field police, Vedpolitie. He was working here until the declaration of World War 2, in here he was working as the deputy commander of the police Tweede Posthuiscommandant. The Dutch authorities retracted the military from Digul because they want to concentrate their force in Ambon to face the Japanese, hence the camp was left to the vedpolitie. It was here when he encountered a cadre of Indonesian independence activists being interned in Boven-Digoel, that he became converted to their cause. As a trusted member of the colonial police, he was more free than most non-Europeans to interact with these political prisoners, and he apparently spent much of his time trading stories with them. Among the prisoners he befriended there were Sukardjo, Sugoro Atmoprasodjo (a former teacher from Taman Siswa), and Hamid Siregar (Panggoncang Alam from Tapanuli). Indey supposedly buried weapons and resources confiscated from Japanese agents during this time, which years later would be dug up and used in the independence struggle. He was also plotting to kidnap Dutch figures at this time, Controleur Wagner and a Dutch Pastor, in conjunction with Japanese forced movement to the south after capturing Fakfak on 1 April 1942. Although this plot would later be uncovered and he was exiled in all but name with his wife and child to Anida forest in Pesnamnam, a region which was known for cannibals from Jair and Mandobo, for 8 months he would live a miserable nomadic life until they found a Catholic priest from southeast Moluccas. He would eventually be recalled to spy on Japanese movement in Asmat regions.

Despite his political alignment, as a government employee he followed Dutch official figures into exile in Australia during the Japanese occupation of the Dutch East Indies. In July 1943 he and a group of 32 civil employees sailed from Tanahmerah Bay, Digul to Brisbane and Cairns. During his stay there, he and others in his cohort were trained in Paratrooper tactics, and were drafted into the Allied forces staging attacks in the South Pacific and Philippines, after finishing training he would be promoted to the rank Corporal. As member of allied forces he was part of operation in Wakde, Sansapor, Biak, Morotai, and Leyte. From January to March 1945, he was involved in mopping up operation in Arso, Waris and Sarmi. In April 1944, as the Japanese were losing the war, members of the Netherlands Indies Civil Administration (NICA), who intended to re-establish Dutch control over the colony, landed in New Guinea. Among those NICA staff were Sugoro, a former Boven-Digoel prisoner and his adjudant, Corinus Krey, who were now employed by the Dutch as an advisor on education and religion, as well as other Papuans, including Marthen Indey, Frans Kaisiepo and Marcus Kaisiepo (formerly under Japanese), and Silas Papare. Among the teacher in the bestuur school was Hamid Siregar, Aron Panggoncang Alam, and Yusuf Nasution (KNIL member). From January 1945 until January 1947, he was district heads for three border districts, Arso, Yamasy and Waris. In these allied operations he also worked with fellow Papuans Silas Papare, Corinus Krey, and Samuel Damianus Kawab. These group within the NICA forces remained sympathetic to the Indonesian independence movement with their base of operation in Kota Nica (Harapan Village) and plotted to strike against the Dutch in New Guinea on 25 December 1945. His leadership of these regions also lead to Dutch authorities suspicion of his activities even though he was not present in Kota Nica himself. Unfortunately, Dutch authorities learned about the plot from a member of defecting Papuan battalion and imprisoned the leaders, at first Sugoro Atmoprasojo and Corinus Krey, afterward Hamid Siregar although Krey would be released. Sugoro would be moved to Merauke which he used to fled through PNG to Java later, while Siregar would be kept in Hollandia. Hearing of this incident and the Dutch method to split rebelling forces along religious lines, Indey would then move from Arso to began more direct involvement in the movement. Later on Panggoncang Alam (from Minangkabau) would lead a rebellion to free Atmoprasojo from Merauke prison on 17 July 1946 by targeting KNIL posts during Malino Conference, although this would be unsuccessful, eventually Indey and Papare would be moved to Serui to not liaise with this movement.

In October 1946, Indey joined the Komite Indonesia Merdeka (Indonesian: Free Indonesia Committee), an anti-Dutch clandestine organization in Abepura (Jayapura), a branch of an organization from Melbourne which aimed to support the 1945 Proclamation of Indonesian Independence. Indey became chairman by December after Dr. J.A. Gerungan was removed by Dutch authority from Abepura, a fact which made him a target for arrest by the Dutch. The foundation of the KIM was quickly followed by the establishment of a parallel movement in Serui, a much larger and more active Partai Kemerdekaan Indonesia Irian (Indonesian: Irian Indonesian Liberation Party) in November 1946, which was headed by Silas Papare in his exile. Meanwhile, in East Bosnik, Biak a red-white flag ceremony was conducted in Lukas Rumkorem backyard which was attended by Frans and Marcus Kaisiepo, Corinus Krey, M. Jouwe, followed by the formation of Partai Indonesia Merdeka (PIM, Indonesian: Indonesian Independence Party) on 10 July 1946. Because of Frans Kaisiepo views and the suggestion of the new name Irian, Dutch authorities did not send Papuan representatives in the follow-up Malino Conference on 20–24 December 1946. Although earlier on 12 December 1946, Marthen Indey, Corinus Krey, and Nicolaas Jouwe sent telegram to Van Mook in Denpasar, to oppose the formation of State of East Indonesia as it did not include West Irian.

In January 1947 Indey traveled to Ambon Island to join the clandestine struggle against the Dutch there. By March of that year he was captured by the Dutch and sent to Hollandia through Biak and sentenced to 4.5 years' imprisonment. Corinus Krey and Petrus Wettebossy would be captured for founding the Partai Irian Dalam Republik Indonesia Serikat, (Indonesian: Irian Inside United States of Indonesia Party), in which Indey was the deputy leader. Despite his imprisonment, he was also awarded the Bronze Cross for his wartime service in 1949.

=== Independent Indonesia ===
After Indonesian independence, the matter of Papua/New Guinea continued to be a point of dispute between Indonesia and the Netherlands. In the late 1950s early 1960s Indey was living in Jayapura (then Hollandia) which was the capital of Netherlands New Guinea in the postwar era. He was generally considered the leader of the pro-Indonesian Papuans there. On 1 May 1950, Marthen Indey and others were freed from Dutch prisons, he and Petrus Wettebossy used this opportunity to meet Mr. J. Latuharhary and Mohammad Yamin to keep on supporting PIM. Upon finding out that the RTC provision on Irian was not followed, he started an underground organization with J. Teppy. In 1962 he was involved in a high-profile infiltration of Indonesian commandos from RPKAD who had landed in New Guinea during Operation Trikora. The international press at the time speculated that Indey was hiding them from authorities and giving them material support. Marthen Indey managed to safe surrounded 9 RKPAD members from Dutch forces and hide them in the forest of Sabron Dosai. He and Elly Uyo would also successfully liaised with forces from the submarine landing of Operation Lumba-Lumba. He would also accommodate around 400 people in gabron Dosai. In September 1962, he was tasked by Dr. Subandrio to smuggle Sujarwo Tjondronegoro, SR, K.J Teppy and others and he would be successful in this endeavor. He was also sent by Indonesia to UN in December 1962 to shorten UNTEA rule in this diplomatic mission he was accompanied with Elly Uyo, E.Y. Bonay, Kaleb Hamadi, Daniel Heumasse and Kelion Kriapan. Later on he also participated in New York Agreement with Indonesian delegation under Dr. Subandrio with J.A. Dimara, Albert Karubuy, Frits Kirihio, Silas Papare, and Efraim Somisu. However, even in 1963 he and Lucas Jouwe were printing proclamations in Hollandia/Jayapura calling for immediate unification with Indonesia and an end to the UN presence there.

Over 2 years from 1 August 1963, Indey would be the resident of Kotabaru and assistant to Governor of Papua. From 1963 to 1968, Indey was elected to the Provisional People's Consultative Assembly representing Irian Jaya. He also participated in the 1964 Asia-Africa Conference in Bandung. He was imprisoned temporarily in 1965 because he was accused of participating with OPM although later on proven to be false.

He died on 17 July 1986, in Jayapura. His tomb in Sabron Yaru, Kampung Dosai, West Sentani district, Jayapura Regency, is marked as a historic site.

On 14 September 1993, Marthen Indey was declared National Hero of Indonesia. An army hospital in Jayapura, which had previously been called Dr. Aroyoko Hospital, was renamed Marthen Indey Hospital in 1998. The city of Jayapura also built a monument to him on the waterfront in the centre of the city.
