= New York Agreement =

Agreement on resolving Western New Guinea dispute

Agreement between the Republic of Indonesia and the Kingdom of the Netherlands Concerning West New Guinea
- Signed: 15 August 1962
- Location: New York City, United States
- Effective: 21 September 1962
- Original signatories: Subandrio; J. H. Van Roijen, C. Scurmann
- Parties: Indonesia; Netherlands
- Depositary: United Nations
- Language: English

Regional map with West New Guinea highlighted. To the west, the Moluccas in Indonesia; to the east, the Australian Territory of Papua and New Guinea (now Papua New Guinea); to the south, mainland Australia.

The New York Agreement, officially the Agreement between the Republic of Indonesia and the Kingdom of the Netherlands Concerning West New Guinea, is an agreement signed by the Kingdom of the Netherlands and Indonesia regarding the administration of the territory of Western New Guinea. The first part of the agreement proposes that the United Nations assume administration of the territory, and a second part proposes a set of social conditions that will be provided if the United Nations exercises a discretion proposed in article 12 of the agreement to allow Indonesian occupation and administration of the territory. Negotiated during meetings hosted by the United States, the agreement was signed on 15 August 1962 at the United Nations Headquarters in New York City, United States.

The agreement was added to the agenda of the 1962 United Nations General Assembly and precipitated General Assembly Resolution 1752 (XVII) granting the United Nations authority to occupy and administer West New Guinea. Although agreements are not able to negate obligations defined in the Charter of the United Nations, and the agreement asserted that it was for the benefit of the people of the territory, some people believed that the agreement was sacrificing the people of the territory for the benefit of the foreign powers.

A United States Department of State summary from 1962 asserts the "agreement was almost a total victory for Indonesia and a defeat for the Netherlands", that the United States "Bureau of European Affairs was sympathetic to the Dutch view that annexation by Indonesia would simply trade white for brown colonialism", and that "The underlying reason that the Kennedy administration pressed the Netherlands to accept this agreement was that it believed that Cold War considerations of preventing Indonesia from going Communist overrode the Dutch case."

== Background ==
"... if Java, Sumatra, etc., should be severed from the Netherlands within the foreseeable future—which God forbid!—then that does not need to be the case of New Guinea. New Guinea does not belong to the Indies Archipelago either geographically or geologically.... Neither the Javanese, the Acehnese, nor the inhabitants of Palembang have any right to this 'empty' country. The Dutch were the first to occupy it, and have the right to use it for the population surplus of the Netherlands ..."

— Colonization advocate P. E. Winkler, 1936

The origins of the dispute over Dutch New Guinea are agreed to have originated in the pre-World War II need to find a homeland for the Eurasian Indo people. According to C.L.M. Penders, "None" of the other reasons, including to develop the island, "advanced by the Netherlands for the continuation of their rule of West New Guinea" rationally served the Dutch national interest enough to hold a territory that would lead it to lose so much business and international goodwill. Beginning in the 1920s, large numbers of unemployed Indo people in Java persuaded the Dutch government to set up colonies in northern West New Guinea, which eventually failed to give the colonists the prosperity they expected. However, New Guinea was conceived of as a "promised land" in the imagination of groups such as the Vaderlandsche Club and the Dutch Nazi Party who lobbied for a "white Dutch province in the Indies". Although this province was never achieved, the Indos maintained a privileged and resented position in Indonesia, such that they were the strongest advocates for an autonomous New Guinea. From 1945 during the Indonesian National Revolution, the Netherlands tried to negotiate for a special place for New Guinea in various conferences with Indonesian nationalists, with the Linggadjati Agreement among other things reserving New Guinea as a place of settlement for Indos.

However, during the Dutch–Indonesian Round Table Conference of 1949, both Indonesia and the Netherlands could not agree on the status of New Guinea, with the Netherlands arguing that it should keep West New Guinea for the eventual self-determination of the natives, once those inhabitants had become sufficiently "mature". The resulting accord was unclear on the final status of New Guinea, although the Dutch Labor Party defeated an amendment that would have explicitly excluded New Guinea from Indonesian independence. From 1951, the Indonesian government interpreted the results of the Round Table Conference as giving it sovereignty over all of the former Dutch East Indies, including New Guinea. Throughout negotiations with the Indonesians, the Netherlands maintained it could not give up sovereignty over Dutch New Guinea, because the conservative parties in the Dutch parliament, deeply humiliated by Indonesian independence and wanting to maintain a colonial stronghold in the area, would not vote to ratify any such agreement. When the Indonesian government withdrew from the Netherlands-Indonesia Union due to frustration at the slow pace of talks over New Guinea, the Netherlands felt relieved from any obligation to continue negotiations on the issue. Indonesia, supported by all of the African and Asian nations except nationalist China, tried to pass a United Nations General Assembly resolution urging the Netherlands to negotiate with it on the status of West New Guinea. However, the resolutions were blocked by the opposition of all of the Western nations except Greece.

Indonesia gained more international support for negotiations with the Netherlands during the Geneva Summit and the Asian–African Conference in 1955, after which Dutch newspapers and churches, previously stalwartly in favour of keeping New Guinea, advocated bringing New Guinea "into a quieter sphere" of United Nations Trusteeship. Nevertheless, in 1956, the Netherlands amended its constitution to include West New Guinea as a constituent country of the Kingdom of the Netherlands, although the government excluded an amendment that would have specified self-determination as the goal of Dutch sovereignty over the territory. Inside West New Guinea, the Netherlands liberalized political parties but banned pro-Indonesia parties as subversive. In response to the Netherlands' hardening, Indonesia's position on New Guinea gradually shifted to say that the people of New Guinea already exercised their right to self-determination with the Proclamation of Indonesian Independence in 1945. After the third and final vote in the United Nations General Assembly in 1957, in which a resolution urging Dutch–Indonesian dialogue, with the support of a majority of nations representing the majority of the world's people, was blocked by the colonial powers, the Indonesian Foreign Minister Subandrio said that it would no longer seek to resolve the "West Irian" (West New Guinea) issue at the United Nations. Mass strikes and illegal seizures broke out in Indonesia against Dutch businesses in 1958, organized by the Communist Party, youths and veterans' groups which led to Dutch nationals fleeing the country. Diplomatic ties were severed with the Netherlands in 1960.

== Negotiations ==
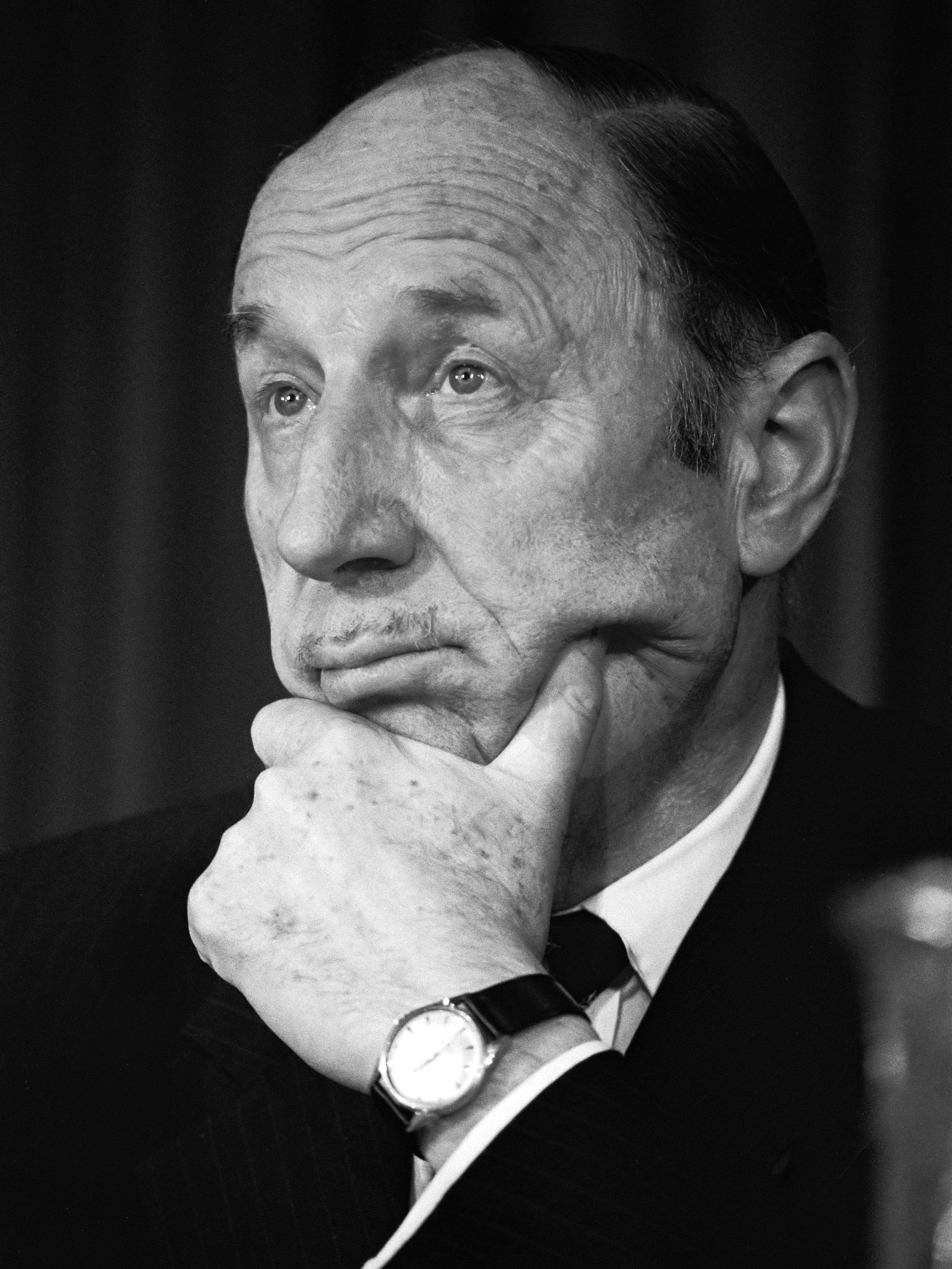
Joseph Luns was Dutch Minister of Foreign Affairs from 1956 to 1971 under seven consecutive cabinets.

During the 1950s, the United States had poor relations with Indonesia, because of its secret support of anti-government rebels in Sumatra and its unwillingness to support the Indonesian claim to West New Guinea. Indonesia was also displeased with the "virtually unanimous hostility of the American press" in its international campaign for West New Guinea. In early 1959, a counsellor wrote a memo on behalf of the US Ambassador suggesting a plan for "special United Nations trusteeship over the territory for a limited number of years, at the end of which time sovereignty would be turned over to Indonesia".

At the inauguration of President John F. Kennedy in 1961, the United States Ambassador to Indonesia, supported by the White House National Security Council, proposed a seven-point plan "to prevent Indonesia from falling under communist control and to win it over to the west", which included promising Indonesia reunion with West New Guinea. The Government's Bureau of European Affairs, Central Intelligence Agency and U.S. Secretary of State Dean Rusk opposed the plan, both because of hostility towards the Indonesian President Sukarno, who had collaborated with the Japanese, and support for the Netherlands, a NATO ally. The Dutch position argued that the native Papuan people were racially different from Indonesia, that incorporation into Indonesia would be "substitution of brown colonialism for white colonialism", and that the "backward" Papuans were not ready for independence; while the Indonesian position argued that Indonesia was already ethnically diverse, that Indonesia wanted to reunite territories separated by colonialism, and that Dutch arguments about democracy were "a trick" to create "at the doorstep of Indonesia a puppet state... under Dutch tutelage".

By March 1961, Indonesia had indicated agreement for United Nations trusteeship on condition that it would not be called a trusteeship. Both supporters of Indonesia and supporters of the Netherlands in the administration cast their positions as favourable to anticolonialism. Although the idea of Papuan independence appealed to senior advisers in the U.S. government, few thought it realistic. US officials were also concerned about world opinion in favour of Indonesia; diplomatic displays of Third World solidarity were increasing, and in January 1962, Egypt closed its Suez Canal to Dutch ships as a protest against the Netherlands' New Guinea policy. In mid-January, Robert F. Kennedy, President Kennedy's brother, travelled to Jakarta and announced that the United States, "as a former colony, is committed to anti-colonialism".

President Kennedy later met with both the Dutch Foreign Minister Joseph Luns and Sukarno, with both agreeing to a United Nations Trusteeship but disagreeing on the details. When the United States sponsored a "compromise" resolution in the United Nations which Indonesia opposed, relations with Indonesia soured. In December, National Security Advisor McGeorge Bundy decisively advised Kennedy towards a more pro-Indonesian position, lest the "Soviet bloc... draw Indonesia even closer to it". American-mediated secret Ambassadorial level talks began in March 1962, without preconditions, but Sukarno was sceptical of American intentions. The talks were held at the Huntland estate at Middleburg, Virginia. An outline of the plan by American diplomat Ellsworth Bunker in 1962 proposed that the Netherlands transfer control over New Guinea to neutral United Nations administrators, who would be gradually replaced by Indonesian administrators, and then entirely to Indonesia, which would then be required to organize a referendum "to give the Papuans freedom" with the United Nations Secretary-General and other United Nations personnel. The Netherlands responded that the proposal was a "shocking betrayal by the United States", initially wanting the referendum to take place under UN administration. Although after the United States threatened to make the negotiations public, it acceded with the addition of a "right to self-determination" into the agreement. Foreign Minister Subandrio, who regarded UN supervision and organization of the referendum as a "humiliation for Indonesia", only agreed to a set of pared-down guidelines for the plebiscite when the United States threatened to "switch sides and support the Dutch". Article XVIII of the final version of the Agreement provided the following parameters for the "act of free choice":

1. Musyawarah (consultative councils) would be instructed on procedures to assess the will of the population
2. The actual date of the act would be completed before 1969
3. The question in the act would allow the inhabitants to decide whether to stay or to separate from Indonesia
4. All adults would be allowed to participate in the act of free choice

On 15 August 1962, representatives from Indonesia and the Netherlands signed the "Agreement between the Republic of Indonesia and the Kingdom of the Netherlands Concerning West New Guinea (West Irian)" at the United Nations Headquarters in New York City.

== Implementation ==
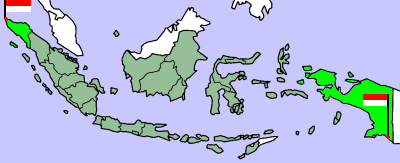
The New York Agreement fulfilled the dream of a "Republic of Indonesia from Sabang to Merauke". Indonesian flags mark those settlements within the regions of Aceh (left) and West New Guinea, both highlighted.

Some members of the quasi-legislative New Guinea Council established under the Dutch were disappointed that the Netherlands had signed the agreement without consulting the Council. Nevertheless, the Council decided to support the agreement and to cooperate with the United Nations and Indonesian authorities in keeping peace and order. A small minority of Council members, including Nicolaas Jouwe, refused to support the agreement and went into exile in the Netherlands, he only returned to Indonesia in 2009. The period of United Nations administration ended on 1 May 1963, as envisioned by the New York Agreement.

Fernando Ortiz-Sanz, the United Nations Secretary-General's representative in New Guinea, observed and approved the process of musyawarah during March and April 1969 for the final Act of Free Choice, although recommending that the councils be enlarged to better comply with the adult eligibility provision of the New York Agreement. In his report, he said that the majority of petitions he received from the New Guineans were pro-Indonesian, although this assessment of local opinion is contradicted by reports from foreign embassies. Between July and August 1969, the Act of Free Choice overwhelmingly concluded in favour of staying with Indonesia. Professor of International Law H.F. Van Panhuys attributes the lopsided results to the lack of demilitarization of the territory, the process of musyawarah ("talking until a unanimous decision is reached... [was] not conducive to an atmosphere in which people could secretly and therefore fearlessly express their preference"), and the lack of an option for union with the Netherlands.

At the United Nations General Assembly, a group of African states, led by Ghana, denounced the Act of Free Choice as an act of "Moslem imperialism" and "Asian racialism". Other states such as India refuted the charges and celebrated Indonesian unity. In October 1969 the United Nations General Assembly passed a resolution 84 to 0 with 30 abstentions that noted "with appreciation the fulfilment... [of] the 1962 Agreement" and thanked Indonesia for "its efforts to promote the economic and social development of West Irian". The dissenting African states proposed an amendment to direct a second referendum in 1975, but it failed because of Indonesian and American opposition. The Dutch government accepted the results and said that the process was compliant with the New York Agreement. Reflecting on the vote, retired United Nations Under-Secretary-General Chakravarthy Narasimhan said in 2001, "The mood at the United Nations was to get rid of this problem as quickly as possible", and "[M]y heart isn't bleeding [for the Papuans]". The United States partially achieved its goal "to win [Indonesia] over to the West", although the Indonesia–Malaysia confrontation and the struggling Indonesian economy cooled relations.

For Indonesia, the implementation of the New York Agreement completed the early Indonesian nationalist goal of what Sukarno called a "Republic of Indonesia from Sabang to Merauke", and represented successful resistance against partition on ethnic or religious grounds. On the other hand, the implementation of the New York Agreement is one of the most cited grievances of the militant Free Papua Movement (OPM), and the years immediately following its implementation were the most violent in the emerging guerrilla conflict with independence supporters, as OPM fighters kidnapped and attacked police, military, and transmigrant targets while the Indonesian military strafed whole villages in response. Although supporters of independence for West New Guinea regard the Act of Free Choice as illegitimate and noncompliant with the New York Agreement, the United Nations officially maintains that West New Guinea's status as part of Indonesia is "final". In 2002, a nationalist assembly of Papuans led by independence activist Theys Eluay declared the New York Agreement "unlawful and morally unacceptable, because Representatives from [West New Guinea] were not involved in it". However Indonesia negotiation teams led by Soebandrio in New York included Papuan representatives such as: Marthen Indey, Johannes Abraham Dimara, Albert Karubuy, Silas Papare, Frits Kirihio, and Efraim Somisu.
