= Huntland (Middleburg, Virginia) =

Historic house in Virginia, United States

- U.S. National Register of Historic Places
- Virginia Landmarks Register
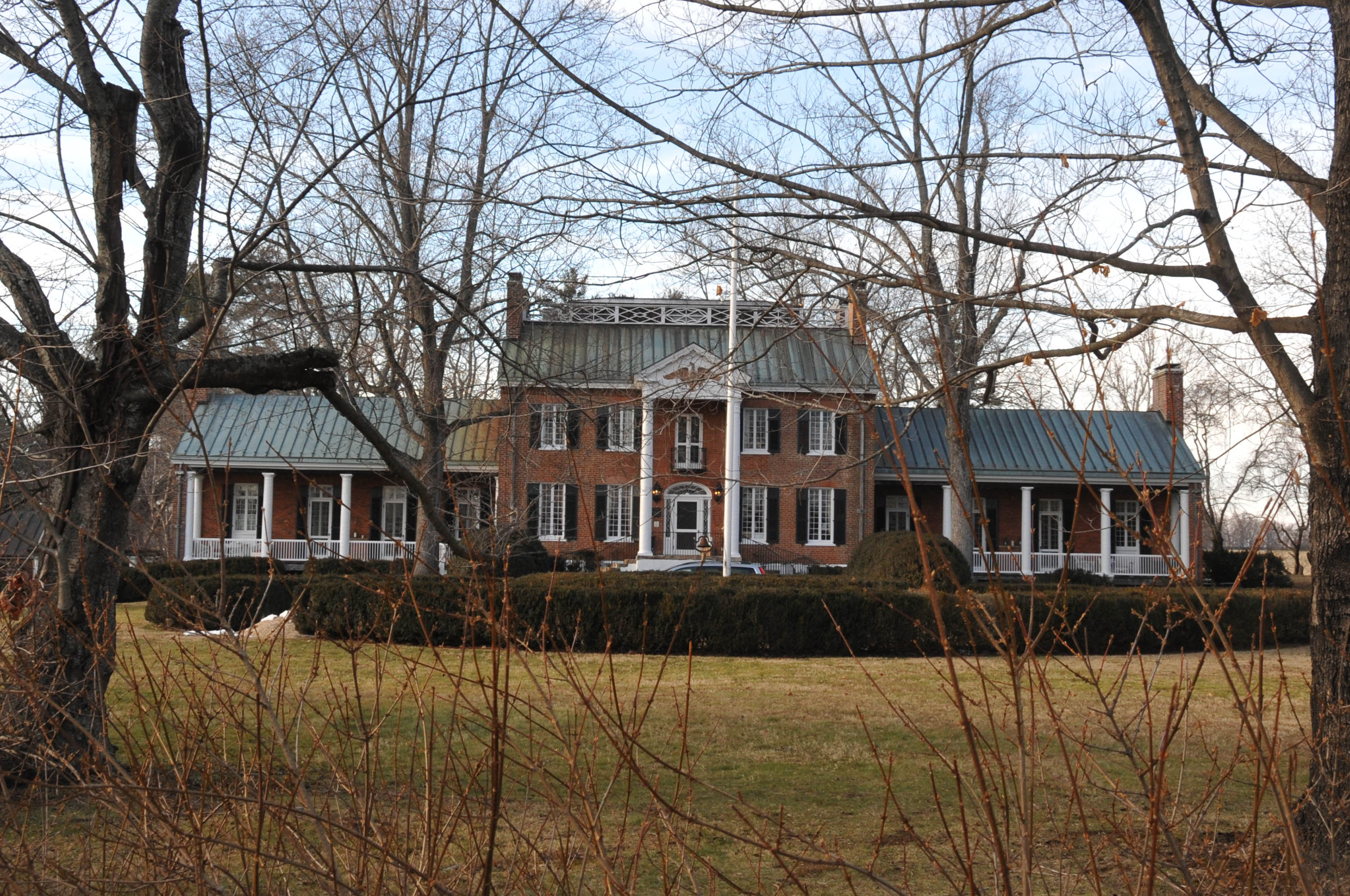

- Location within Northern Virginia Location within Virginia Location within the United States
- Location: 35955 Huntland Farm Rd., Middleburg, Virginia
- Coordinates: 39°00′54″N 77°45′55″W
- Area: 413.5 acres (167.3 ha)
- Built: 1834, c. 1912-1915, 1962
- Built by: Benton, William, Sr.
- Architect: Peabody, Wilson & Brown; Thomas, Joseph B.
- Architectural style: Federal, Colonial Revival
- NRHP reference No.: 13000990
- VLR No.: 053-0487

Significant dates
- Added to NRHP: December 24, 2013
- Designated VLR: September 2013

Huntland, originally known as New Lisbon, is a historic estate located at Middleburg, Loudoun County, Virginia. The original section was built in 1834, and is a two-story, five-bay, Federal style brick dwelling. It built by master brickmason William Benton Sr., who also constructed nearby Oak Hill, the home of President James Monroe. In 1915, the house was remodeled and enlarged with side one-story brick additions and Colonial Revival-style detailing. The estate was also enhanced with gates, walls, and terraced gardens that are reminiscent of English manor estates and state-of-the-art kennels and horse stables. Also on the property are the contributing spring house, smokehouse, and a guest cottage, all constructed around 1834, and early-20th-century structures that include secondary dwellings, a dairy barn with attached silos and a corncrib, a milking parlor, five sheds, a garage, a pump house, and a cistern.

The Huntland estate was once devoted primarily to foxhunting, a sport that reinvigorated the economy of the region in the early-20th century. Between 1955 and 1963, the estate was owned by George R. Brown and Herman Brown of Houston, Texas, and Huntland became a retreat for notable Washington dignitaries including Lyndon B. Johnson. In 1962, secret international negotiations were conducted at Huntland that resulted in the New York Agreement between Indonesia, the Netherlands and the United Nations centering on the future of Western New Guinea.

It was listed on the National Register of Historic Places in 2013.
