= Silas Papare =

Papuan–Indonesian politician and guerrilla leader

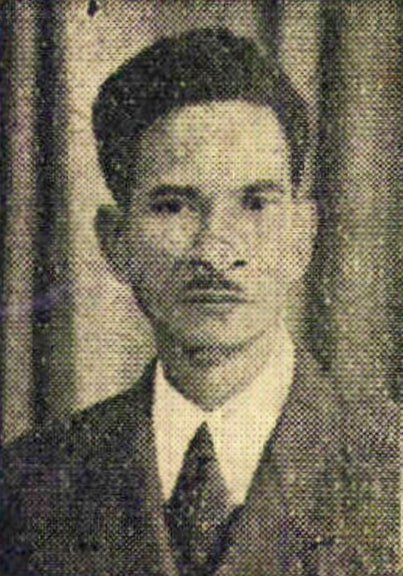
- Official portrait, 1955

Member of the People's Representative Council
- In office 24 March 1954 – 26 June 1960
- Preceded by: Radjiman Wedyodiningrat
- Constituency: West Irian

Personal details
- Born: Silas Ayari Donrai Papare; 18 December 1918 Serui, Dutch East Indies
- Died: 7 March 1978 (aged 59) Jakarta, Indonesia
- Party: PKII
- Spouse: Regina Aibui (m. 1936)
- Children: 9
- Parents: Musa Papare (father); Dorkas Mangge (mother)

Silas Ayari Donrai Papare (18 December 1918 – 7 March 1978) was a Papuan–Indonesian politician and guerilla leader who is a National Hero of Indonesia.

Originating from the Yapen Islands, Papare trained and worked as a nurse prior to the Second World War, during which he organized local resistance and gathered intelligence against occupying Japanese forces. While he initially held pro-Dutch views after the war, this shifted after he was involved in pro-Indonesian rebellion and resulted in not being delegated to the Malino Conference, later on he was influenced by Sam Ratulangi into founding the pro-Indonesian Indonesian Irian Independence Party.

Following a failed uprising against the Dutch, he was imprisoned before he left Papua in 1949, only once returning in 1950. He became a legislator between 1954 and 1960 and had participated in the Round Table Conference and the New York Agreement. Papare then began criticizing the Indonesian government's actions in Papua throughout the 1960s and was briefly arrested, though he later returned to the legislative body. He died in 1979, and was made a National Hero in 1993.

== Early life and education ==
Papare was born in the town of Serui, in the Yapen Islands, on 18 December 1918, from father Musa Papare and mother Dorkas Papare. At the time, Serui was one of the most open parts of Papua to external influences and ideas. He enrolled at the local village school (Volkschool) at the age of nine and graduated in 1930, working at his parents' farm for a year before pursuing further education at a nurse school in Serui starting in 1931. Papare was among some of the first to be educated in the Dutch civil servant schools in Papua, which were established in 1944. After he completed school in 1935, Papare worked in Serui for some time before moving to work at the Dutch oil firm, Nederlandsche Nieuw Guinea Petroleum Maatschappij company hospital at Sorong in 1936, where he was a head nurse. Due to personnel shortages in Serui, Papare was reassigned there in 1940.

== Wartime career ==
Since 1939, a Koreri movement was started by Angganita Manufandu from Sowak, this movement was formed in opposition to foreign occupation and Christianity which was replacing local religion centering on Biak. When Japanese forces arrived in New Guinea, Angganita was captured which resulted in a second iteration led by Stefanus Simioparef. Open fighting against the Japanese forces started on 10 October 1942, on Manswan Beach South Biak, which resulted in about 2000 local casualties. This resulted in another Koreri rebellions in Yapen-Waropen, centering in East Yapen. During this time Papare as intelligence operative of NEFIS, made contacts with former Koreri rebels in the jungle. During the Pacific War, Papare became known as a middleman between Allied authorities and Papuans, and he sided with the Allies throughout the conflict. He organized local resistance against Japanese forces around the Cenderawasih Bay area and provided intelligence to allied forces there, particularly after the Battle of Hollandia.

According to his diary, on 1 May 1944, an allied plane landed on Nau island, he swam toward it and was given map of American position as well as an American flag, which was important symbol for local cargo cult movement, as well as sign for allied planes of the area. On 1 June 1944, he was entrusted to lead a re-organised local guerilla forces against Japanese forces. He sent three Papuans, Otniel Papare, Abiatur, and Yehuda from Manokwari to allied position in Hollandia to report on Japanese position in Nabire and Manokwari. While Silas Papare and Eliezer Jan Bonai returned to their base in Nau island awaiting allied forces. Based on Papare reports, allied forces were able to sink Daito Maru, Japanese supply ship heading to Serui. Afterward local forces led by him were able to take over weapons from Japanese forces. Papare headed back to Nau from Serui in torpedo boat to scout Japanese position in Warenai and Sorong and supervised the construction of local defense in 13 days.

From 1 to 14 August 1944, Papare was part of an operation to find and rescue the four man crew of a crashed American B-25 bomber. A 20-man Dutch-Australian-American rescue team led by Dutch 2nd lieutenant Louis Rapmund (who was an officer with NICA) was dropped off by a Catalina flying boat at the mouth of the Kais River and went upstream to find the crashed bomber in the swamps. After fighting off Japanese troops near Baru, the team found the crew and brought them back to Biak.

Later in September and October, Papare went with Louis Rapmund to Roemberpon Island to rescue a thousand or more people who were left by the Japanese to starve on the island. Amongst them, prisoners of war, Heiho auxiliaries of the Japanese and Rōmusha forced labourers. Helped by US Navy PT boats, food was supplied and the people brought to Biak. On October 5, Papare went with a combat team of Alamo Scouts led by Lt Tom Rousavill and Lt Louis Rapmund to attack a Japanese internment camp at Oransbari to liberate the civilians held there. After a short fight, the Japanese guards were defeated and 66 people liberated and brought to Biak.

Attack by allied forces began on 10 August 1944, based on his report, they were able to bomb Japanese position, furthermore he was involved in an attack on Japanese forces in Mugim, on 17 August 1944. He was also involved in the preparation of the last attack on leftover Japanese position in Cendrawasih Bay, in Post Mowari and Manokwari. The attack was initiated on 22 September 1944, at 4 am. In this attack, Markus Kaisiepo and Frans Kaisiepo were freed, even though they were members of Kenpeitai Auxiliary Forces. With the success of these attack, all Japanese forces in Cendrawasih Bay surrendered to Allied forces. After the war, he was awarded the Bronze Lion by the Dutch government, and was given the military rank of a sergeant.

== Anti-colonial struggle ==
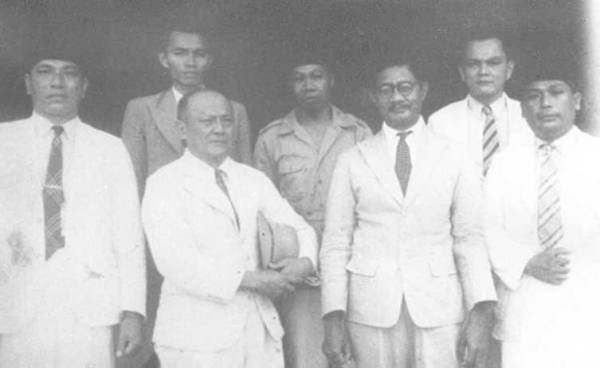
Sam Ratulangi (bottom row, second from left) influenced Papare during the former's exile in Serui

Immediately after the war, once Dutch authorities took over Papua's administration from the Allies, Papare became the head nurse in Serui. Although he was entrusted to be advisor to Sugoro Atmoprasojo Bestuur (civil servants) school set up by Resident Van Eeechoud. Notable students of these school included Markus Kaisiepo, Frans Kaisiepo, Nicolaas Jouwe and Lukas Rumkorem. At that time, his anti-Indonesian views were known, stemming from his observations of Indonesian civil servants in Papua being submissive to Japanese authorities while being repressive against Papuans. Although he would also made contacts pro-Indonesian figures such as Marthen Indey from Papuan Battalion, as well as Corinus Krey, who was adjudant to Atmoprasojo, from his hospital work in Harapan village. He would be involved in the formation of student organization tasked of helping Sugoro Atmoprasojo, with other members including Lukas Rumkorem, Yan Waranu, G. Sawari, S.D. Kawab, and Corinus Krey. Harapan Village would be the basis of Pro-Indonesian movement at this time. In December 1945, Atmoprasojo alongside his students would launch an attempted rebellion alongside KNIL, former members of Kempeitai and Papuan Battalions, with the plan to be executed on 25 December 1945. Dutch authorities would be alerted by a member of Papuan Battalions on 14 December 1945, and in an attempt to split the potential rebel forces spread rumours that Muslim members attempted to attack Christian villages during this attack. KNIL forces from Kloofkamp, Hollandia who were predominantly Christian Ambonese and Minahasan would mobilized and attack Harapan Village located 40 km away. Utilising forces from Rabaul, Dutch authorities would also capture 250 people possibly involved in this attack. Atmoprasojo, Corinus Krey, Marthen Indey and eventually Papare would be captured and sent to prison in Hollandia. Due to these events, Dutch authorities decided to send Frans Kaisiepo instead of Papare to the Malino Conference to represent Papua in the formation of the State of East Indonesia, to not alienate the Ambonese whose support were crucial for the formation of the pro-Dutch “State of East Indonesia,” a decision which slighted Papare. On 17 July 1946, coinciding with Malino Conference, Panggoncang Alam (from Minangkabau) would lead a failed rebellion to free Atmoprasojo and other captured figures by disarming KNIL troops and attacking vital installations, because of Papare and Indey possible involvement, they were exiled to Serui.

Earlier in June 1946, Sam Ratulangi (the Indonesian Republican Governor of Sulawesi) was already exiled to Serui, he would eventually made contact with both exiles. Papare's newfound dislike for the Dutch, coupled with Ratulangi's background as a medical practitioner by trade, resulted in Papare developing pro-republican views, and by November 1946, Papare had founded the Indonesian Irian Independence Party (Partai Kemerdekaan Indonesia Irian, PKII). Ratulangi became the general adviser to the party, which was then the largest and most active political party in West Papua. By 17 August 1947 (the second anniversary of the proclamation of Indonesian independence), Papare had led an Indonesian flag-raising ceremony in Manokwari. Papare attained a sort of a messianic reputation locally, regarding being a savior from Dutch colonialism into an imagined utopia under Indonesian rule.

== Independent Indonesia ==
Papare was imprisoned in Serui though was released under pressure of Alwi Rachman his deputy and Serui locals, though he was moved to Biak because the Dutch authorities claimed he suffered memory loss. Using this same reason, Papare tricked the Dutch authorities to fled to Java, in 1949, leaving PKII leaderless. Although on 16 March 1949, PKII released a motion that it still exist to support integration with Indonesia and asked to be involved in negotiation of Indonesia-Netherlands-UN (KTN). In Yogyakarta in October 1949, he founded the Irian Revolutionary Body (Badan Perjuangan Irian) and he later attended the Dutch–Indonesian Round Table Conference as representative of PKII. He briefly returned to Papua in 1950 as the Indonesian delegation in the Dutch–Indonesian Commission surveying the region. Papare would not return to Papua, though PKII remained the dominant party in Papua throughout the 1950s.

Between 1951 and 1954, Papare worked in hospitals in Jakarta, before he was appointed to the Provisional People's Representative Council on 24 March 1954 to replace the deceased Rajiman Wediodiningrat. In 1953, Indonesian government formed Irian Bureau, where Papare became the first Commissioner, to fight for Indonesia integration and serve as embryo for governorship. He intended to become the future provincial government for Papua. Although these efforts would fail, which lead to the dissolution of Irian Bureau. The central government alongside Papare, would reform Irian Bureau to become Irian Barat Governorship in 1957. He was reappointed to the Provisional People's Representative Council in 1956, as one of the delegations from Papua. He maintained his parliamentary seat until his pensioning in 1960.

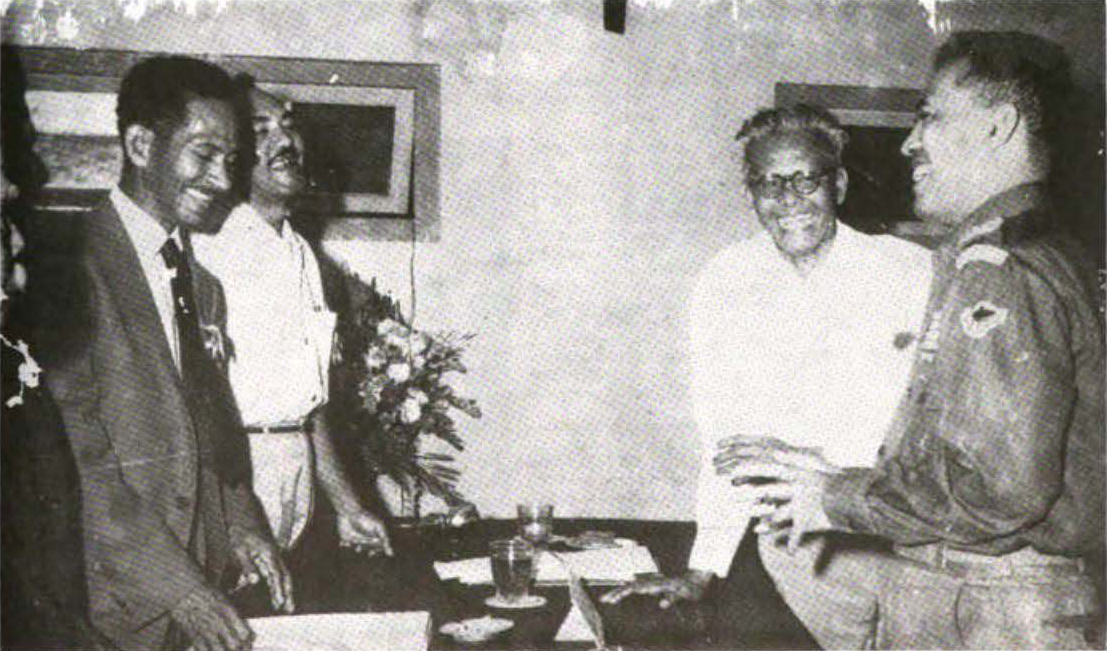
M.S. Rumagesan, Silas Papare, N.L.Suwages, Soegoro Atmoprasodjo, and A.H. Nasution in Putra-putra Irian Barat Conference in Cibogo Bogor, 14–15 April 1961

Canadian researcher David Webster claimed that in 1961 Papare told the American Ambassador to Indonesia at the time that he intended to return to Papua to support the growing independence movement, and that he was threatened with arrest for his criticism of Sukarno, despite Papare being considered as the future Indonesian governor of Papua at that time. In 1962, he was sent to New York City as part of the Indonesian delegation led by Subandrio alongside other Papuan representatives which include J.A. Dimara, Albert Karubuy, Frits Kirihio, M. Indey, and Efraim Somisu, which culminated with the New York Agreement.

Papare was arrested in 1962 during UN administration, though he had been released by 1963 and he returned to the parliament. In 1966, he and other Papuan parliamentarians criticized the central government's neglect of Papua and demanded that the "Act of Free Choice" to be held. Papare was particularly critical of government's military actions in the campaign against the OPM revolts in the mid-1960s.

He died on 7 March 1978 in Jakarta, and he was buried in Serui.

== Legacy ==
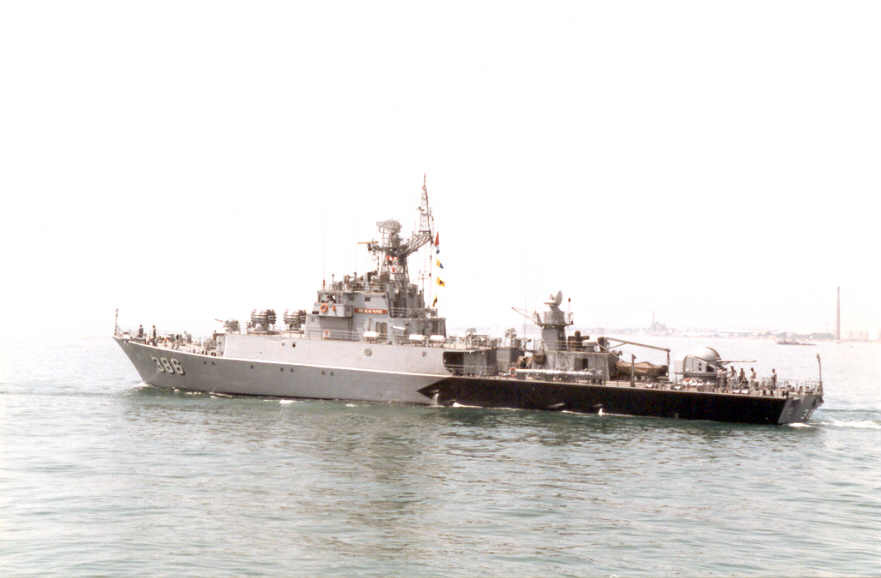
KRI Silas Papare (386)

Papare was declared a National Hero of Indonesia in 1993. His name was given to a Parchim-class corvette of the Indonesian Navy, a political school in Jayapura, and as a road name in Serui. Additionally, an Indonesian Air Force Base in Jayapura Regency is also named after him.

== Bibliography ==
- Chauvel, Richard (2005). Constructing Papuan Nationalism : History, Ethnicity, and Adaption. Washington, D.C.: East-West Center. ISBN 1-932728-26-0.
- Lumintang, Onnie; Haryono, P. Suryo; Gunawan, Restu; Nurhajarini, Dwi Ratna (1997). Biografi Pahlawan Nasional Marthin Indey dan Silas Papare (PDF) (in Indonesian). Indonesia: Ministry of Education and Culture.
- Penders, Christian Lambert Maria (2002). The West New Guinea Debacle: Dutch Decolonisation and Indonesia, 1945-1962. University of Hawaii Press. ISBN 978-0-8248-2470-9.
- Singh, Bilveer (2011). Papua: Geopolitics and the Quest for Nationhood. Transaction Publishers. ISBN 978-1-4128-1206-1.
- Webster, David (2012). "Race, Identity and Diplomacy in the Papua Decolonization Struggle, 1949-1962". Race, Ethnicity and the Cold War: A Global Perspective. Vanderbilt University Press. ISBN 9780826518439.
