= Nicolaas Jouwe =

Papuan activist

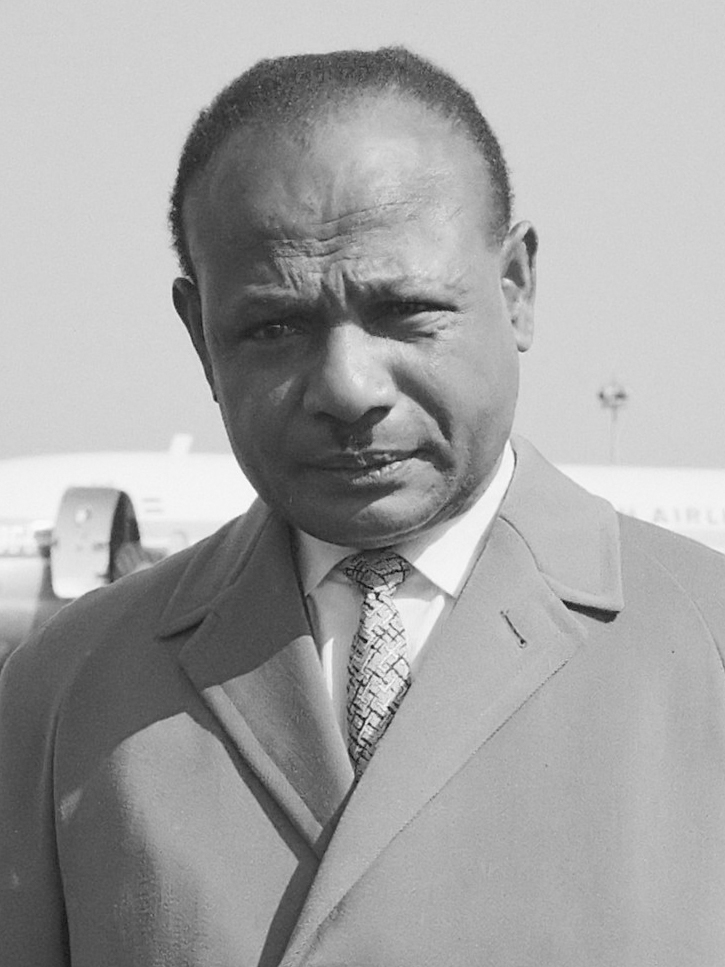
- Nicolaas Jouwe in 1962
- Born: 23 November 1923; Hollandia, Dutch East Indies
- Died: 16 September 2017 (aged 93); Jakarta, Indonesia
- Resting place: Jayapura, Papua
- Known for: Former independence activist, designing Morning Star flag

Nicolaas Jouwe (24 November 1923 – 16 September 2017) was a Papuan leader who was selected to be vice president of the New Guinea Council that governed the Dutch colony of Netherlands New Guinea. As the president of the New Guinea Council was the Dutch civil servant Frits Sollewijn Gelpke, Jouwe was the highest ranking Papuan politician in the colony.

During Japanese occupation, he – alongside Johan Ariks, Frans Kaisiepo and Markus Kaisiepo – were members of the Japanese Kenpeitai. In 1945, he was listed as among the students in school of bestuur in Kota NICA (Jayapura), which became the first generation of Papuan elites. Among the school students were Frans Kaisiepo, Lukas Rumkoren, Yan Waromi, Cornelis Krey, Marthen Indey, Silas Papare, G. Saweri, Samuel D. Kawab. On 31 August 1945, during Queen Wilhelminna birthday celebration in Bosnik (East Biak), Jouwe, who at the time was known as an Indonesian nationalist, alongside Corinus Krey, Frans Kaisiepo, Marcus Kaisiepo alongside others was meeting in Lukas Rumkorem's house and instead celebrate Indonesian independence ceremony. He was also a member of Komite Indonesia Merdeka (KIM), a branch of organisation supporting indonesian independence in Abepura from Melbourne, although he would later quit after it became Partai Indonesia Merdeka (PIM).

After Frans Kaisiepo used his participation in Malino Conference to popularise the name "Irian", Dutch authorities did not send any Papuan representative in the follow-up Denpasar Conference which was held from 7–24 December 1946, even though on 12 December 1946, Nicolaas Jouwe, Marthen Indey, and Corinus Krey protested this decision and sent a telegram to van Mook in Denpasar to oppose the formation of the State of East Indonesia as Western New Guinea was not eventually included under pressure of Dutch Catholic Party, although van Mook claimed that financial and ethnic issues were the reason. In 1947, Jouwe and Markus Kaisiepo were involved in a disagreement with PKII leader, Silas Papare, which led Papare to move to Java.

In a broader effort to dissociate Papua elite movement with the broader Indonesian movement, the Dutch authorities removed Colonel Abdulkadir Widjojoatmodjo and began to persuade educated Papuan elites to change side, among them Nicolaas Jouwe. In 1949, he was listed among the delegations in Round Table Conference in Den Haag, he was the representative for BFOs for New Guinea. In 1951 he was among the Papuan leaders that opposed Indonesian efforts to integrate West Irian. He was among the founding member of Gerakan Persatuan Nieuw Guinea (GPNG).

In 1961 he was selected to be vice president of the New Guinea Council. In 1962, After the colony was ceded to the United Nations Temporary Executive Authority in October 1962 and subsequently to Indonesia six months later, he left New Guinea for the Netherlands, where he settled in the town of Delft. He vowed never to return to his native land if it were still occupied by Indonesia. According to his memoir, on 16 September 1962, he was invited to a secret meeting with John F. Kennedy to meet Sukarno. In this meeting, Kennedy convinced Jouwe that Papua's efforts to become independent was Dutch political ploy to separate Papua from Indonesia. Over the years he worked for Papuan independence in Netherlands, he became even convinced of this position combined with discriminatory practice of Dutch Foreign minister Joseph Luns toward Papuan delegation that he knew from his nephew, Marie Papare, Papuan delegation for Indonesia, these became his biggest motivation to return to Indonesia, later on.

In October 2008, a documentary was broadcast on Dutch television about Jouwe's life. In it, he reiterated his stance not to return to Indonesian-administered Papua. In January 2009, he was invited by the Indonesian government to visit his ancestral land. He responded positively, and visited Papua in March 2009. About this visit a follow-up documentary was made by the same director. He finally returned to West Papua in 2010 to become an Indonesian citizen. In a lunch that was held for Mark Davies on 12 May 2014, Australian journalist of SBS, Jouwe stated "I am a leader of the National Liberation Council of West Papua. I am not a member of the OPM. In fact, the OPM was created by the Dutch in 1965 to coincide with the crackdown on the Indonesian Communist Party," he further added,"The Papuan youth who had been trained were then asked by the Netherlands to establish the OPM."

On 13 August 2014, Nicolaas Jouwe alongside Ondofolo Franzalbert Joku former OPM foreign minister, Nicholas Simione Messet former OPM diplomat in Sweden, Priest Lipiyus Biniluk, Contant Karma former vice governor and regional secretary, received an award from President Susilo Bambang Yudhoyono, in the form of Bintang Jasa Nararya, while former governor Abraham Octavianus Atururi received Bintang Mahaputera Utama.

Jouwe died on 16 September 2017 at the age of 93 in Jakarta, Indonesia.
