= Albert Karubuy =

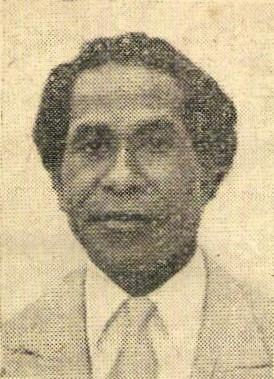

Member of the People's Representative Council
- In office 21 August 1956 – 26 June 1960
- President: Sukarno

Member of the People's Representative Council of Mutual Assistance
- In office 26 June 1960 – 13 March 1968
- In office 29 June 1968 – 28 October 1971
- President: Sukarno; Suharto

Personal details
- Born: 5 January 1915 Miei-Wandamen, Manokwari, Dutch East Indies
- Party: Indonesian-Irian Independence Party
- Education: Zending People's School; CBZ Surabaya (1929)
- Known for: one of the pro-integration activists of Papua

Albert Bernardus Karubuy (born 5 January 1915) was a pro-integration activist from Papua and one of the three members that represented the West Irian province in the People's Representative Council after the 1955 elections. He was the political adviser of the Indonesian delegation during the 12th United Nations General Sessions in 1957.

== Early life ==
Karubuy was born in Miei-Wandamen, Manokwari, on 5 January 1915. He went to the Zending People's School, a mission school established by the Dutch missionaries in Papua. After passing from the school, he migrated to Surabaya, and studied in the Centrale Burgerlijke Ziekenhuis (transl. Central Civil Hospital) of Surabaya. He graduated in 1929.

== Career ==
After graduating, he was ordered by Soetomo to return to Papua. He went to Hollandia (now Jayapura) and worked at a settlement hospital in 1933. He resigned from the job in 1937, and returned to Surabaya to study from Soetomo. He returned two years later, and worked at a settlement hospital in Luwu, South Maluku. He resigned from the job in 1941 due to the unaccepted circumstances from the job.

== Activism and political career ==
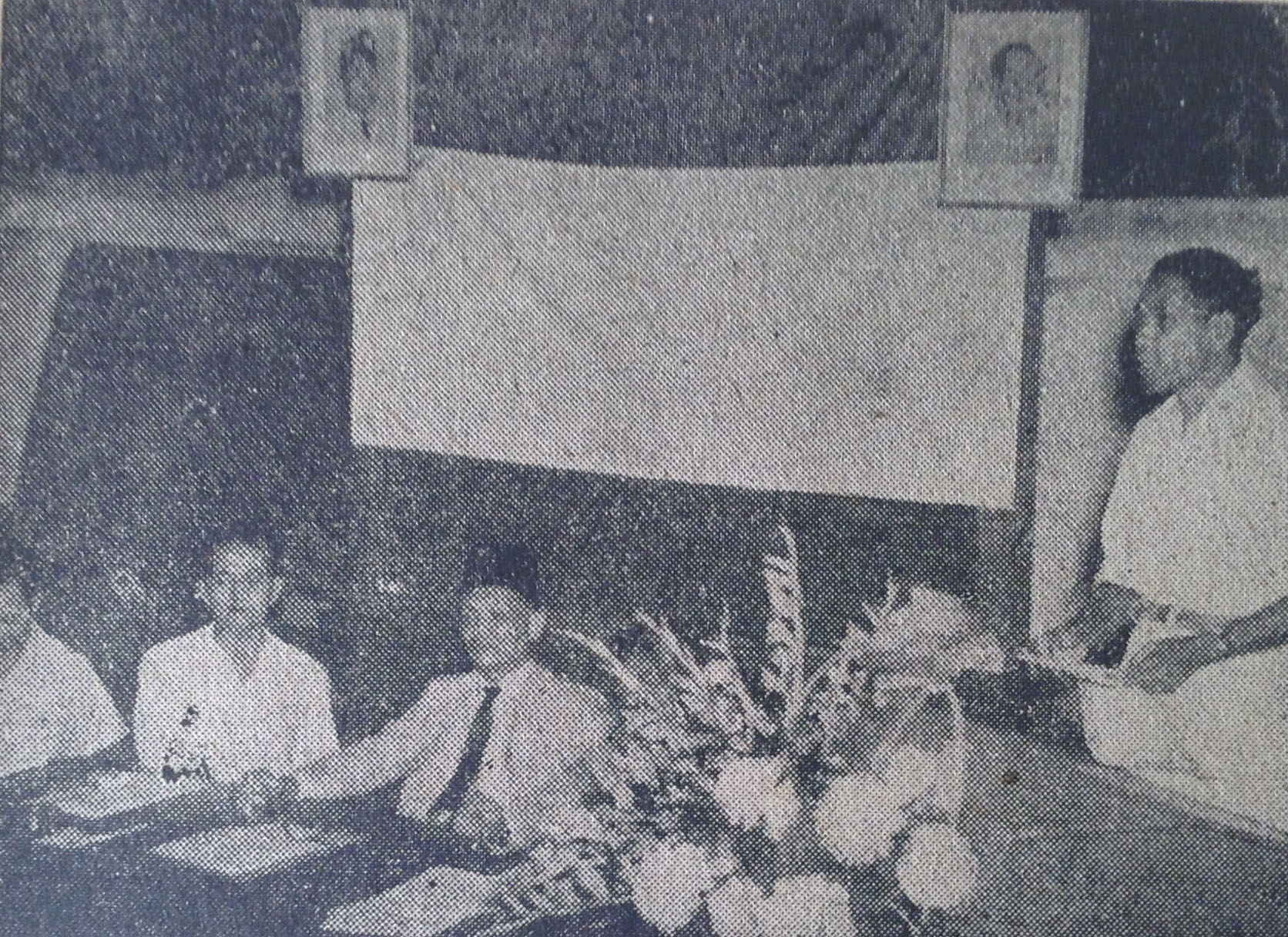
Karubuy giving speech in Indonesia National Congress (1949)

After his studies in Surabaya, Karubuy joined Indonesia Muda (transl. Young Indonesia) and Persatuan Bangsa Indonesia (transl. Indonesian Nation Unity). He actively participated in the protests organized by both organizations, and was arrested by the veld politie. Soon after, he and his friends were released and went back to school.

During the Japanese occupation of the Dutch East Indies, he was arrested due to his reluctance to cooperate with the Japanese authorities. He was released after the independence of Indonesia, and he went to South Maluku to participate in the guerrilla against the oncoming Dutch forces as a health staff. He was arrested for 18 months by the Dutch authorities in 1946. After being released, Karubuy joined the "Indonesian Tigers" forces, commanded by Robert Wolter Mongisidi, against Raymond Westerling.

In 1962, he was sent to New York City as part of the Indonesian delegation led by Subandrio alongside other Papuan representatives which include J.A. Dimara, Silas Papare, Frits Kirihio, M. Indey, and Efraim Somisu, which culminated with the New York Agreement.
