= Indonesian Irian Independence Party =

Indonesian Irian Independence Party Partai Kemerdekaan Indonesia Irian
- Abbreviation: PKII
- Leader: Silas Papare
- Founded: 29 October 1946
- Dissolved: 1 September 1962
- Youth wing: Indonesian Youth Union
- Ideology: Pancasila; Indonesian nationalism
- Political position: Big-tent
- Religion: Protestantism

The Indonesian Irian Independence Party (Indonesian: Partai Kemerdekaan Indonesia Irian, PKII) was a pro-Indonesian party in Dutch New Guinea. The party was established in 1946 by several pro-Indonesian students as a way to support the integration of Papua into the territory of Indonesia. The party's leader, Silas Papare, was posthumously declared a National Hero of Indonesia on 14 September 1993.

The party's ideology was based on Pancasila and Christianity. The party had a youth wing, the Indonesian Youth Union (Indonesian: Gabungan Pemuda Indonesia, GAPI), which was formed on 28 October 1958.

== Establishment ==
The party was established on 29 October 1946 in the town of Serui, in the region of Yapen Waropen (present-day Yapen Islands Regency). The party was established with Silas Papare as the leader and Alwi Rachman as his vice. The party strove for the recognition of the independence of Indonesia as a united nation from Aceh to Papua, and served as the point of contact for pro-Indonesian movements all over Papua, such as in Biak, Sorong, Raja Ampat, Kaimana, Inanwatan, and Fakfak. The party had around 4.000 members in Yapen Waropen.

The integration of pro-Indonesian movements in Papua under PKII alarmed the Dutch. To counter the influence of PKII in Papua, the Dutch authorities formed the New Guinea Council (Dutch: Nieuw-Guinea Raad, Indonesian: Dewan Nugini) in 1961. Some members of the council would later form the pro-independence Free Papua Movement (Indonesian: Organisasi Papua Merdeka, OPM) after the integration of Papua into Indonesia and the start of the Papua conflict.

To connect the pro-Indonesian movement in Papua with Indonesia, the party sent motions and resolutions to the Government of Indonesia in Jakarta regarding the independence of Indonesia and the pro-Indonesian movement in Papua. The party also sent its leader, Silas Papare, to Jakarta, as the representative of PKII.

== Development ==
The party established branches in the villages around the town of Serui on 30 November 1947. The establishment of the branch in the village of Serui-Laut was done by eleven members, who acted as representatives coordinated by Silas Papare. Andris Wayoi and Sakeus Bonai were chosen as the leaders of this branch. The branch had around 300 members as of 1947.

To garner more youth members, the party formed the Indonesian Youth Union on 28 October 1958, under the leadership of Piter Wayoi and Aser Samori. The youth wing had around 60 members during its formation.

== See also ==
- West New Guinea dispute
