= 1961 Dutch New Guinea general election =

General elections were held in Dutch New Guinea for the first and only time in January 1961.

== Background ==
The elections were held following the establishment of the New Guinea Council (Raad) to replace the Council of Directors, which consisted of the heads of government departments. The new council consisted of 16 elected members and 12 members appointed by the Governor. Voting was open to all Dutch citizens aged 21 and over who had lived in the territory since 1 January 1958.

The 16 elected members were elected from 14 constituencies. Members were directly elected in Hollandia and Manokwari, with the other twelve constituencies having a two-stage process where voters elected representatives that subsequently selected the Council members. Illiterate voters were able to whisper the name of their chosen representative to polling station staff.

== Results ==
Constituency	Elected members
Ajamaru	Daud Deda
Fakfak	Nicolaas Tanggahma
Hollandia	Nicolaas Jouwe
Hollandia City	O.J. de Rijke
Japen–Waropen	E.J. Boney, M.B. Ramandey
Kaimana	Mohamad Achmad
Manokwari	H.F.W. Gosewich
Merauke	A. Kendau Gebse
Nimboran	Manasse Suwae
Radja Ampat	Abulla Arfan
Ransiki	P. Torey
Schouten Islands	Markus Kaisepo, B. Mofu
Sorong	A. van Zeeland
Teminaboean	A. Onim
Source: Pacific Islands Monthly

=== Appointed members ===
Appointed members
L.J. van de Berg
Bertus Burwos
Karel Gobai
F. Kamma
Clemens Kiriwaib
V. Maturbongs
Thontji Mezeth
Fredericus Poana
Simon Samkakai
Dorkas Tokoro-Hanasbey
Dominicus Walab
Herman Womsiwor
Source: Pacific Islands Monthly

== Aftermath ==
J.H.F. Sollewijn Gelpke was chosen as Speaker.
