= New Guinea Council =

Representative body in Dutch New Guinea

History
- Succeeded by: West Irian House of Representattives

Leadership
- Chair: Frits Sollewijn Gelpke
- Vice-Chair: Nicolaas Jouwe
- Clerk: J. W. Trouw
- Seats: 28

Elections
- Voting system: 16 elected
- Voting system: 12 appointed
- Last election: 1961

Meeting place
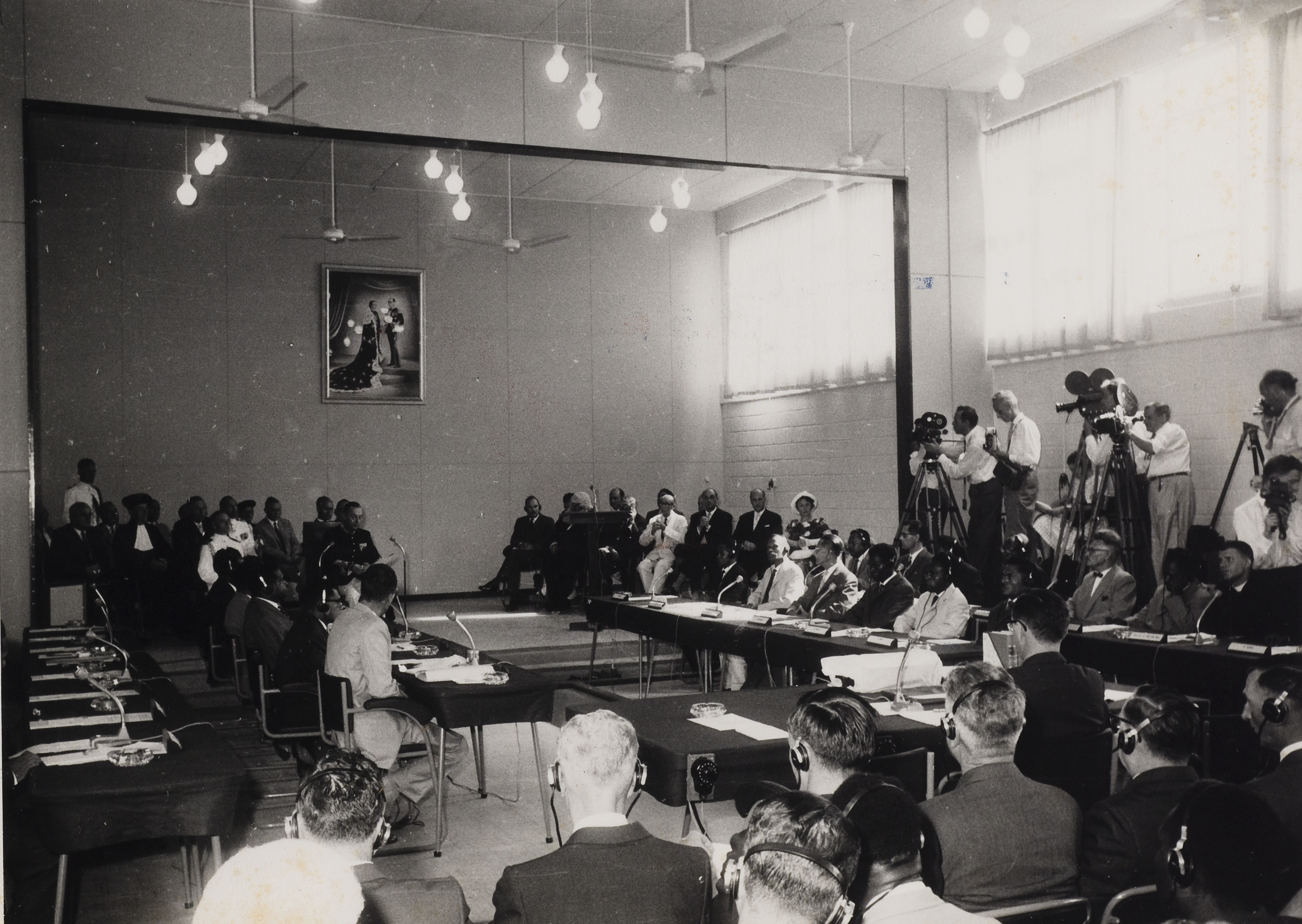
- Hollandia

The New Guinea Council (Dutch: Nieuw-Guinea Raad, Indonesian: Dewan Nugini) was a unicameral representative body for the Dutch overseas territory of Netherlands New Guinea between 1961 and 1962 and the United Nations administered territory of West New Guinea between 1962 and 1963.

== History ==
=== Netherlands New Guniea ===
Prior to the formation of the New Guinea Council, there existed a Council of Directors, which consisted of the heads of government departments. Dutch authorities initially began to establish local government bodies such as village councils and regional councils.

The New Guinea Council was inaugurated on 5 April 1961 with 28 council members, 16 of whom had been elected in elections held during January 1961. The council's inauguration was attended by representatives from Australia, France, the Netherlands, New Zealand, the United Kingdom and other Pacific Forum nations with exception of the United States.

The council was requested to make its wishes on self-determination known within a year. During an emergency session the council drafted a national manifesto and symbols including the Morning Star flag for a new national identity to be known as "West Papua".

=== United Nations Temporary Executive Authority ===
Following the August 1962 New York Agreement between the governments of the Netherlands and Indonesia, the administration of Western New Guinea was assumed by the United Nations Temporary Executive Authority (UNTEA) on 1 October 1962. The New Guinea Council, was re-convened by the United Nations administrator on 4 December 1962. It was disbanded on 1 May 1963 when Western New Guinea was handed over to Indonesia.

== Council members and officials ==
=== Members ===
Members of the council were elected in the 1961 Dutch New Guinea general election.

Elected members

Constituency	Elected members
Ajamaru	Daud Deda
Fakfak	Nicolaas Tanggahma
Hollandia	Nicolaas Jouwe
Hollandia City	O.J. de Rijke
Japen–Waropen	E.J. Boney, M.B. Ramandey
Kaimana	Mohamad Achmad
Manokwari	H.F.W. Gosewich
Merauke	A. Kendau Gebse
Nimboran	Manasse Suwae
Radja Ampat	Abulla Arfan
Ransiki	P. Torey
Schouten Islands	Markus Kaisepo, B. Mofu
Sorong	A. van Zeeland
Teminaboean	A. Onim

Appointed members

Appointed members
L.J. van de Berg
Bertus Burwos
Karel Gobai
F. Kamma
Clemens Kiriwaib
V. Maturbongs
Thontji Mezeth
Fredericus Poana
Simon Samkakai
Dorkas Tokoro-Hanasbey
Dominicus Walab
Herman Womsiwor

=== Officials ===
Frits Sollewijn Gelpke was Council Chairman and Nicolaas Jouwe was Vice-Chair. J. W. Trouw was the Clerk of the Council.

== Council building ==
The council building was built in Hollandia between 1960 and 1961. Currently the building houses the regional legislature of Papua, People's Representative Council of Papua.

== Gallery ==
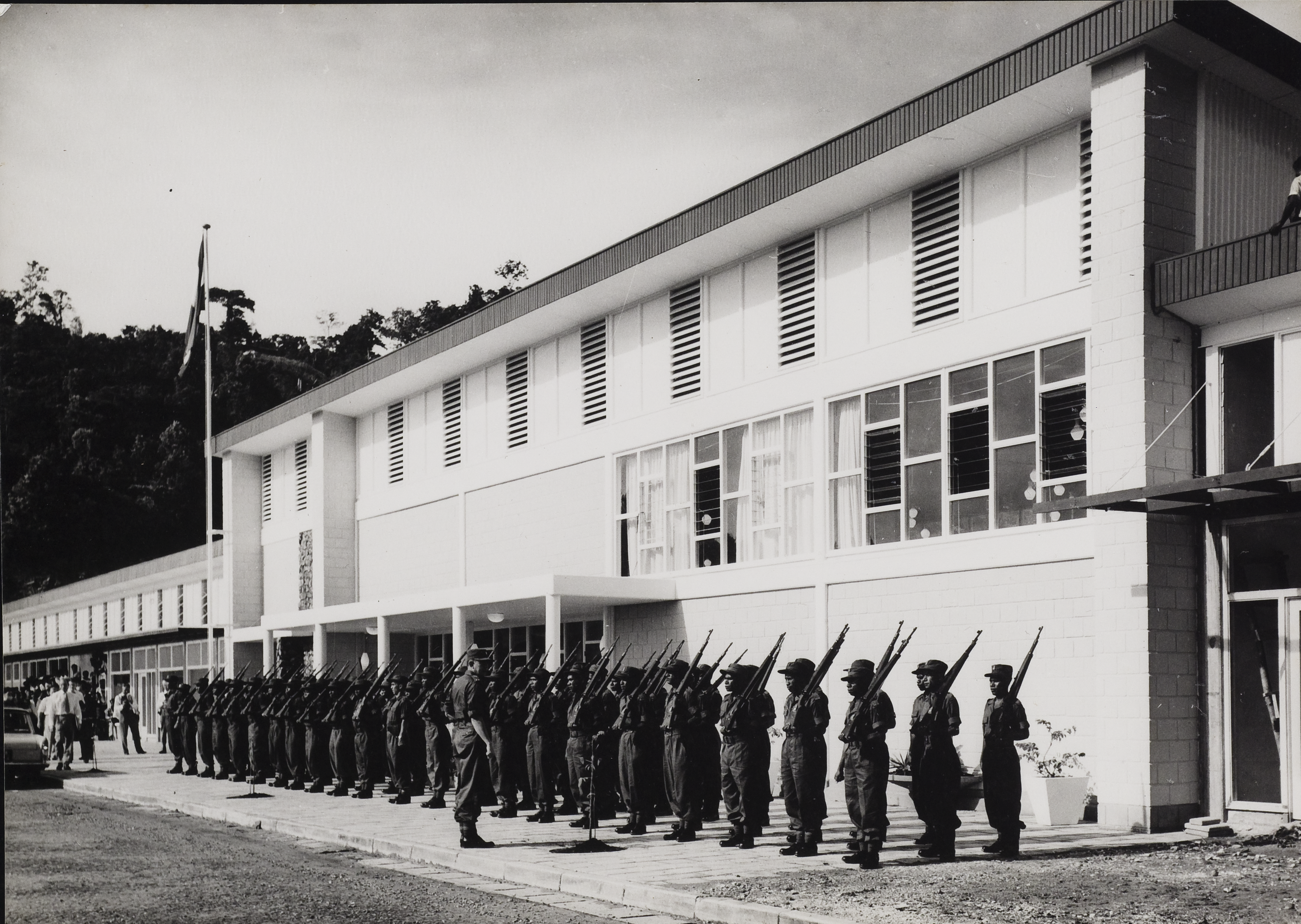
Council building in Hollandia

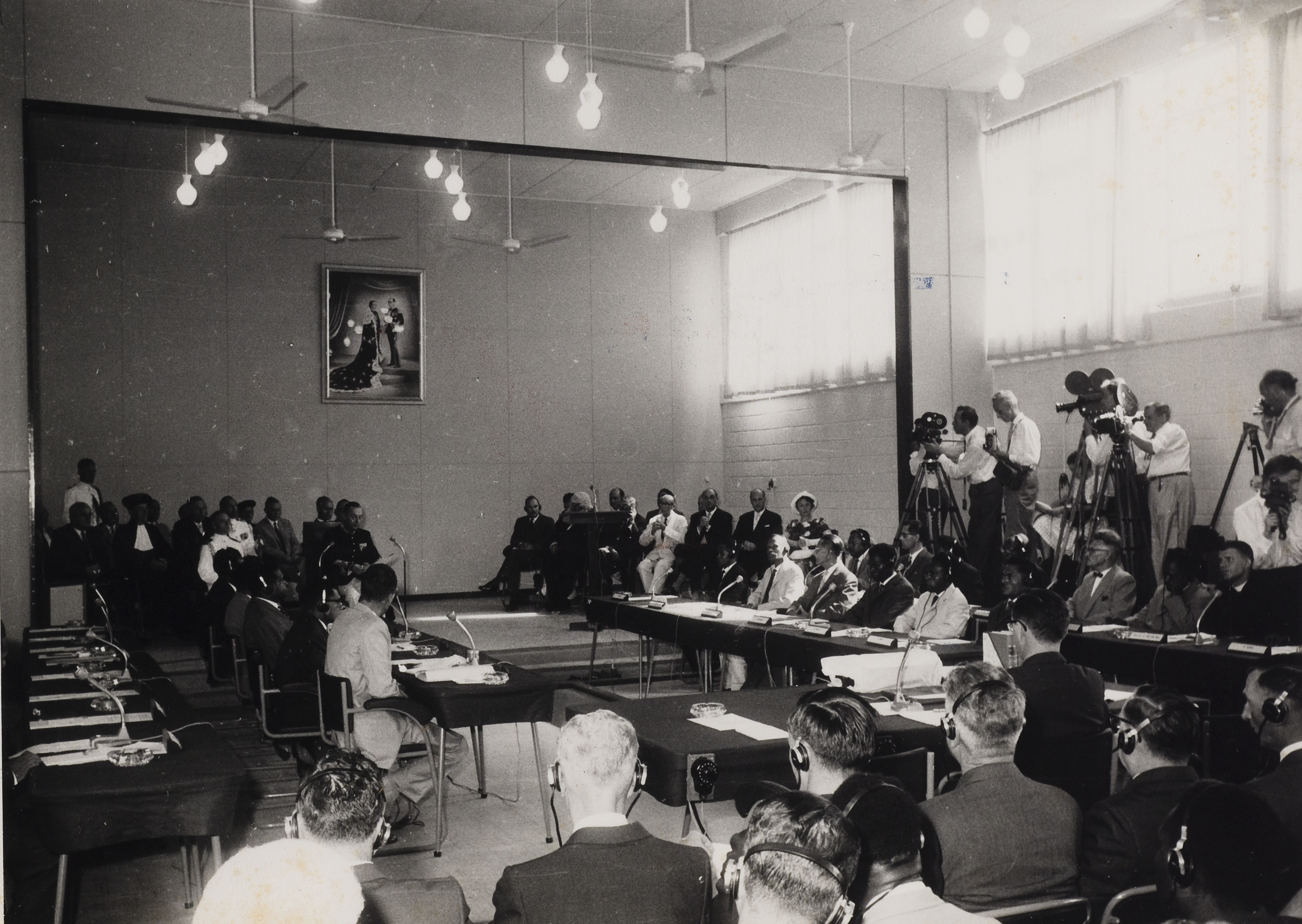
New Guinea Council in session

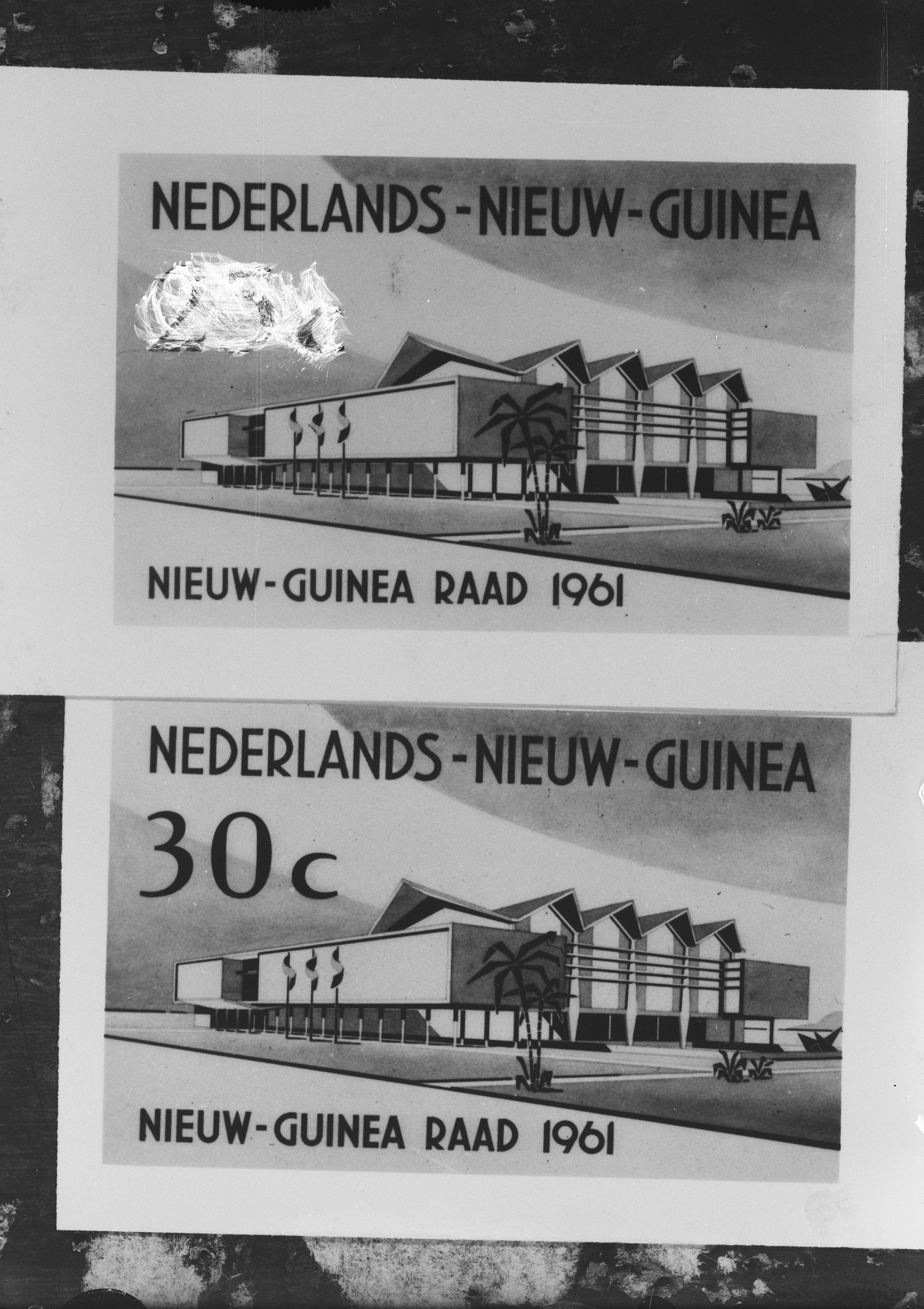
Council building in Hollandia

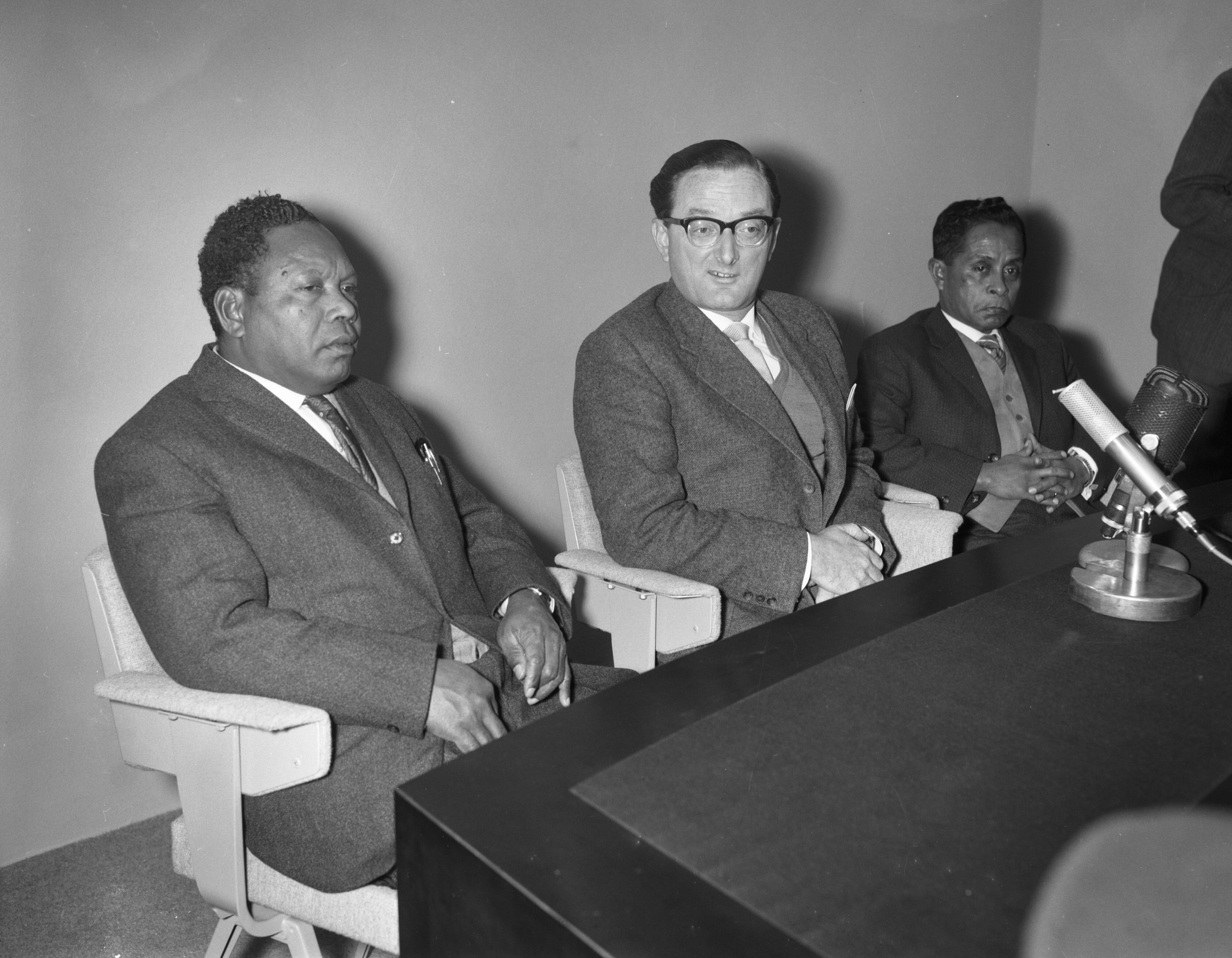
Chairman J.H.F. Sollewijn Gelpke and councillors Arfan and Mofu

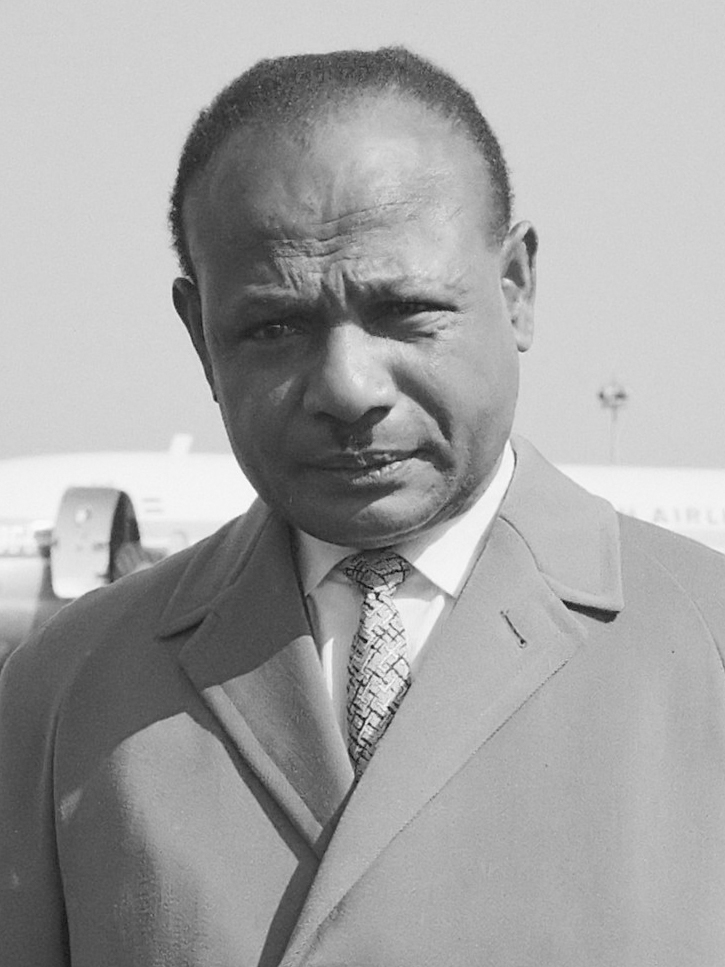
Vice-chair Nicolaas Jouwe

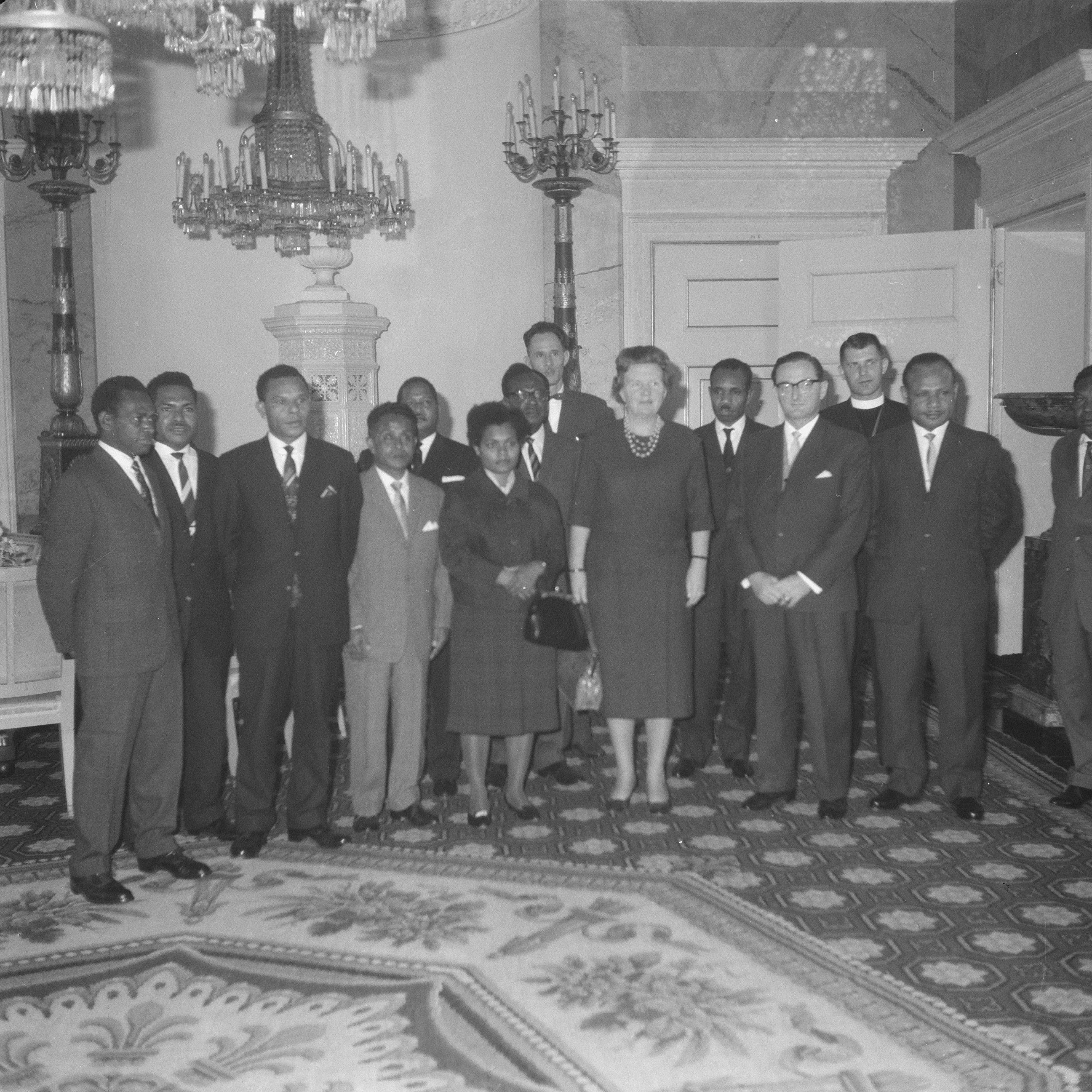
Members of the council with Queen Juliana of the Netherlands

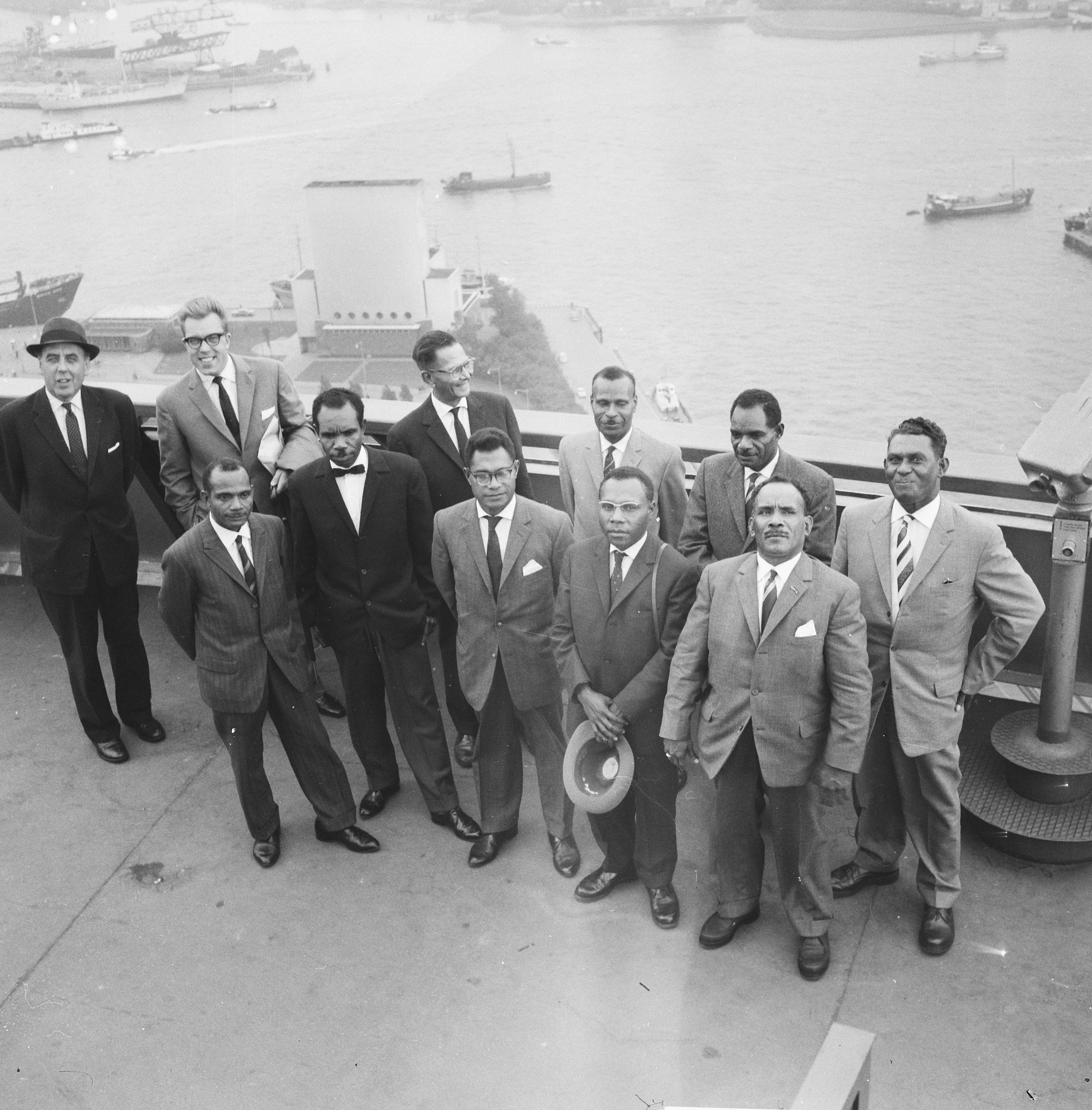
Members of the council at Euromast

== See also ==
- Kosovo Transitional Council, similar body that existed in United Nations Administered Kosovo between 1999 and 2001
- National Council (East Timor), similar body that existed in United Nations Administered East Timor between 1999 and 2001
