= Dorkas Tokoro-Hanasbey =

Papuan and Indonesian teacher and politician

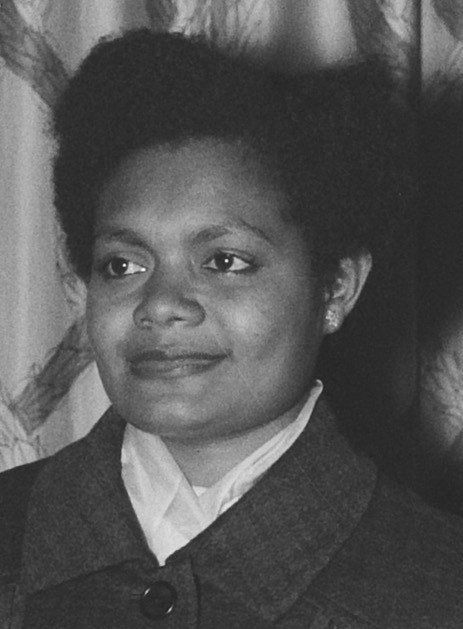

Member of the People's Representative Council
- In office 3 March 1966 – 28 October 1971
- President: Suharto
- Preceded by: Silas Tokoro
- Parliamentary group: West Irian/Irian Jaya

Member of the New Guinea Council
- In office 5 April 1961 – 1 May 1963
- Governor General: Pieter Platteel
- Parliamentary group: Hollandia/Women's Group

Personal details
- Born: Dorkas Hanasbey; 30 November 1937 Enggros, Hollandia, Dutch New Guinea
- Died: 24 August 2000 (aged 62)
- Spouse: Silas Tokoro
- Children: 3

Dorkas Tokoro-Hanasbey (née Hanasbey; 1937-2000) is a Papuan and Indonesian teacher and politician. She was the only female member of the New Guinea Council, serving from its inauguration in 1961 until its dissolution in 1963. Upon the annexation of Papua by Indonesia, she became a member of Papua's regional parliament, the Papua Regional People's Representative Council, and Indonesia's House of Representatives.

== Life and career ==
Dorkas Hanasbey was born in 1937 in the Enggros village of Hollandia (now Jayapura), the capital of Dutch New Guinea. Upon receiving her teaching diploma in 1954, she began teaching in middle schools, including at an all-girls middle school in the Genjer subdistrict of Hollandia until 1957. She was also a regular contributor for Triton, a monthly illustrated publication owned by the Bevolkingsvoorlichting (indigenous information) bureau of the Dutch New Guinea government. In the social sector, she was the leader of a mother's club in Hollandia.

Dorkas was married to Silas Tokoro, a religious teacher who was dismissed and later worked for the government. The couple has two daughters and one son from their marriage.

=== Appointment to the New Guinea Council ===
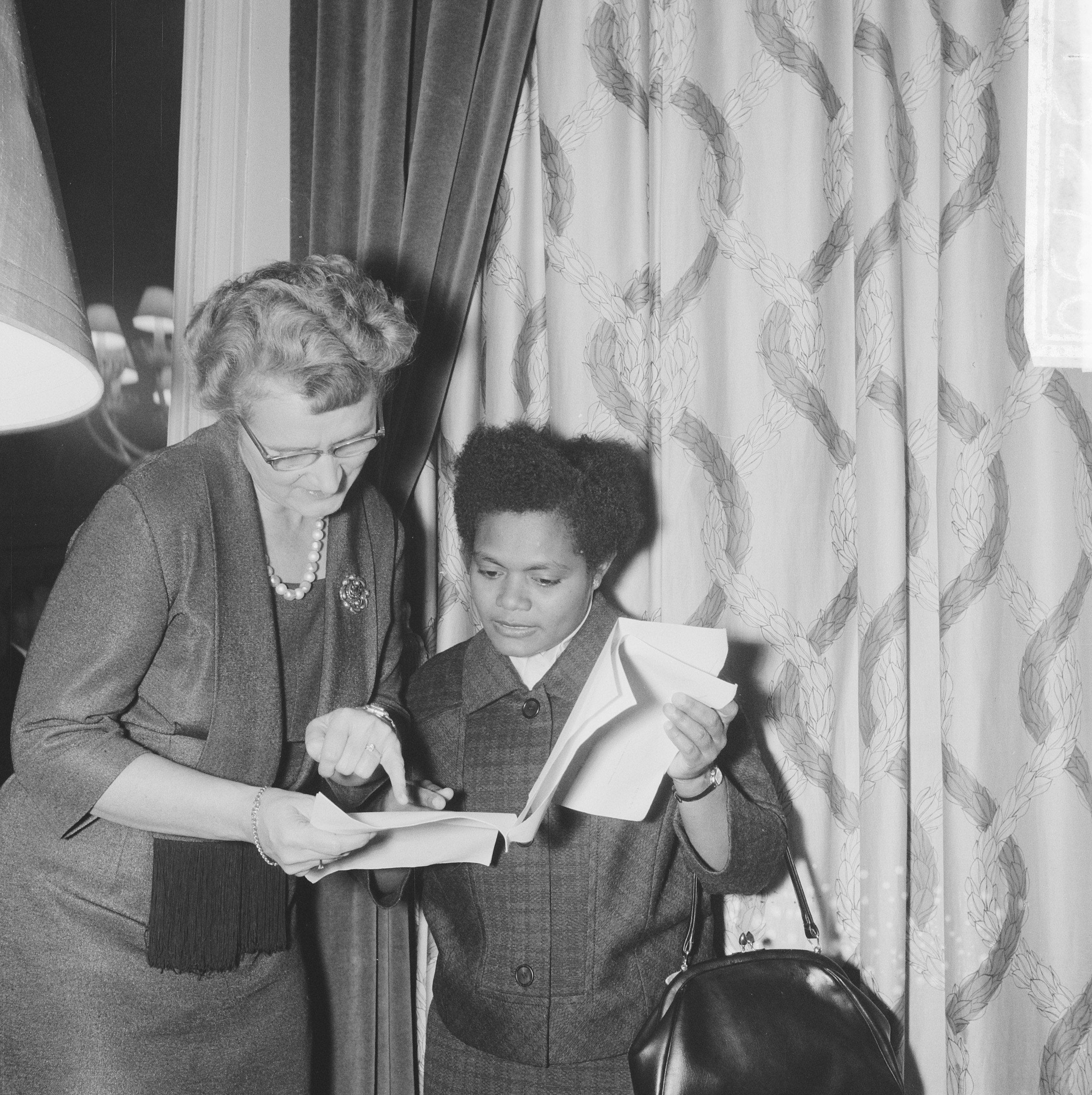
Tokoro-Hanasbey with Dutch Social Works Minister Marga Klompé.

Tokoro-Hanasbey was appointed by governor-general Pieter Platteel to represent Hollandia in the New Guinea Council. Being the only female member of the council, the governor-general also designated her to represent women. She and other council members were installed by the governor-general on 5 April 1961. Tokoro-Hanasbey was late for her inauguration and only arrived half an hour after the event had begun. She was the only member who arrived late for the inauguration. In an interview with Het Parool, Tokoro-Hanasbey stated that she wants to focus on furthering female representation in the Dutch New Guinea and spreading awareness on gender equality.

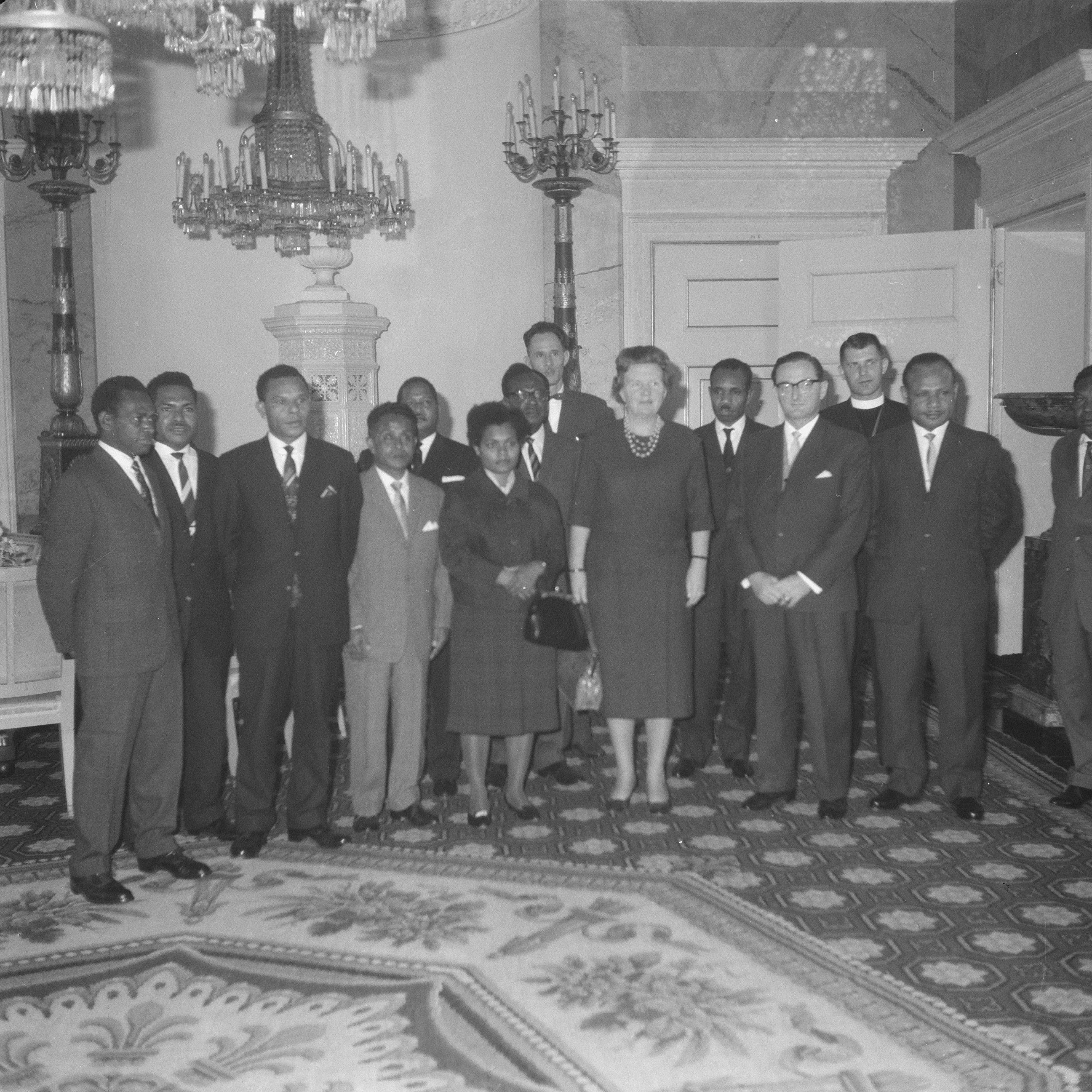
Tokoro-Hanasbey (third from the right, in front) with Queen Juliana of the Netherlands.

As parliament members, Tokoro-Hanasbey, along with speaker Marcus Kaisiëpo and deputy speaker Nicolaas Jouwe, issued a call in the Pittsburgh Courier in 1962. The call asked for assistance from the global "negro brothers and sisters" to counter the "menace of Indonesia imperialism". The call was reprinted in other newspapers with various other textual and pictorial supplements, including an image of Tokoro-Hanasbey's swearing-in as a parliament member.

=== Later career ===
The New Guinea Council was dissolved on 1 May 1963, exactly five months after the handover of authority of Papua from the United Nations Temporary Executive Authority (UNTEA) to the Indonesian government. During the UNTEA period, Tokoro-Hanasbey and several members of the New Guinea Council were invited by the Indonesian government to visit various provinces in Indonesia. Following the annexation of Papua to Indonesia, Tokoro-Hanasbey co-signed the Statement of Determination (Pernyataan Kebulatan Tekad) or called Kotabaru Charter (Piagam Kotabaru) along with members of the Papua Regional People's Representative Council—Papua's regional parliament—and representative of social groups, pledging loyalty to Indonesia. It is delivered to Sukarno in Jakarta represented by co-signers, Marthen Indey and Herman Wayoi.

In 1963, Tokoro-Hanasbey was appointed to Papua's parliament, the Papuan Regional People's Representative Council, alongside her husband. her husband later resigned from the position to serve in the House of Representatives. About a year later, on 3 March 1966, her husband was recalled to serve in the Papuan civil service, and Tokoro-Hanasbey took his seat. She was in the position until 1971.
