= Stephan Lucien Joseph van Waardenburg =

Dutch governor of New Guinea (1900-1975)

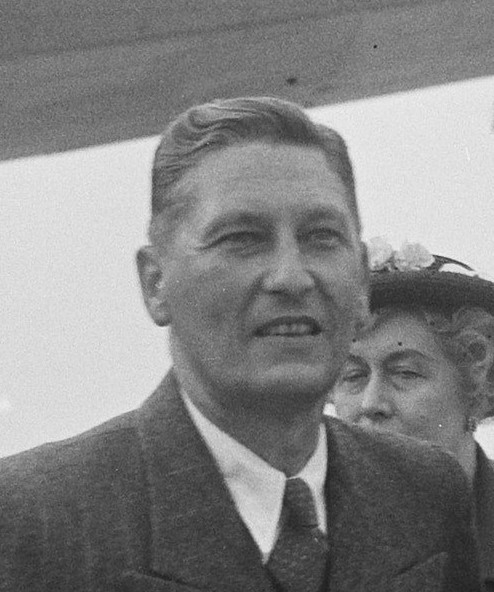
- S.J.L. van Waardenburg (1950)

1st Governor of Netherlands New Guinea
- In office 8 February 1950 – 24 April 1953
- Preceded by: Jan Pieter Karel van Eechoud (acting)
- Succeeded by: Jan van Baal

Personal details
- Born: 21 February 1900 Buitenzorg, Dutch East Indies
- Died: 4 April 1975 (aged 75) Den Haag, Netherlands

Stephan Lucien Joseph van Waardenburg (21 February 1900 – 4 April 1975) was the first Dutch-appointed governor of Dutch New Guinea.

== Early career ==
Van Waardenburg was born in Buitenzorg in the Dutch East Indies to Dirk Adriaan and Stephanie (Gallas) van Waardenburg. After studying "Indology" at the Rijksuniversiteit in Leiden, he served as a government official in Celebes from 1921 to 1931. While serving in this capacity, he met Lucy Mathilde Rickson in Watempone, whom he married on 7 November 1927. He continued his civil service career as secretary to Jambi from 1931 to 1933, at the same time he continued his studies. He became a government official to Bandjermasin from 1933 to 1934, and was part of the head office Administration of the Outer Islands until 1941. Between then and the outbreak of World War II, he held managerial positions in the Dutch East Indies, including that of assistant resident in Batavia.

== World War II ==
Van Waardenburg's wife, Lucy Mathilde, and three children (Maud, Tjoet and Hettie) were with him when fighting in the Pacific theater escalated and the Japanese invaded and occupied Indonesia. Van Waardenburg was taken prisoner of war and interned in various Japanese prison camps, from 1941 to 1945 (unbeknownst to him, his future son-in-law, Siward Ypma Sr., was also interred in a different Japanese prison camp in Indonesia, after having been captured while serving in the Royal Dutch Navy).

During his internment, van Waardenburg's wife and children remained in the house, until it was confiscated by the Japanese military to use as an officer’s barracks, and they were evicted. Van Waardenburg survived the prison camps and was reunited with his wife and children, who themselves survived the war. He returned to civil service duty, initially becoming the head of political research in the Department of the Interior at Buitenzorg, from 1945 to 1946. Following this, he became an advisor for local finance, in the same department, for the remainder of 1946.

The family returned to The Hague (Den Haag), Netherlands where van Waardenburg was involved with various civil and political affairs from 1947 to 1948. He returned to the Dutch Indies when he became head of the Department of Administrative Affairs, again in the Department of the Interior at Buitenzorg, to 1949. He then became an appointed delegate of the high representative of the crown for South Sumatra Palembang from 1949 to 1950.

== Creation of the position of governor ==
During that time, as part of the Colonial Administration Regulations of 1949, the Dutch government in The Hague determined that a number of delegates of the high representative of the crown should be placed in service to administer and govern Dutch New Guinea. A governor (gouvernour) would be appointed by the Dutch monarch. The governor would be assisted by other high representatives, as a council, in fulfilling his mandate and collectively hold legislative power. It was considered "imminent" that van Waardenburg should be appointed as the governor to establish and fulfill the mandate, and move the population into the 20th Century, with the intent to avoid unnecessary cultural dislocation and political unrest.

Van Waardenburg was appointed by royal decree (proclamatie) dated 6 January 1950 as governor of Dutch New Guinea (with a retroactive date of 27 December 1949). His position as gouverneur was established in Hollandia (in the northeast corner, adjacent to Australian New Guinea) and was directly responsible to The Hague. The primarily Dutch administration was set up immediately after the Republic of the United States of Indonesia was created at the end of 1949. He replaced the temporary “acting” governor, Jan Pieter Karel van Eechoud. With this new appointment, van Waardenburg left South Sumatra for New Guinea in late January 1950.

Van Waardenburg began his appointment in very primitive conditions, which were actually the remnants of the first headquarters of General MacArthur. It was described by his wife, Lucy, as being "comprised of cardboard, corrugated iron and mosquito netting". Despite this, he was able to build an administration that included (in part) First Lieutenant Vreedenburgh, Government Secretary Baarspul, Director of Health Dr. van Hoeve, Director of Technical Affairs Mr. Arends, and Head of Aviation Mr. Schredgardus. Many of these had been top level members of the Department of Overseas Territories in The Hague, bringing with them experience or background in Netherlands-Indies alliance. Although Dutch New Guinea was still rebuilding from the devastation from World War II and a volatile growing nationalism by Papuans, he was only given a first budget of 35 million guilders.

It was Governor van Waardenburg’s ambition that Malayans would colonize potentially wealthy Dutch New Guinea within five years. "We will be able to throw open the doors of New Guinea when we have dealt with three of our major problems – malaria, housing and food." He expected that "within 5 years (Dutch Niuew Guinea) will be able to allow colonists to come in because only then shall we be able to welcome them". As such he was very welcoming of Malayans and Malayan Eurasians.

Initially, the body was to be composed of 21 members: 10 Papuans to be elected, 9 Dutch with 7 elected and 2 appointed by the governor, and 2 members from the non-Papuan communities were added (one elected and one appointed). However, it was determined that the atmosphere was still too soon and haggard for elections, so advisory councils were set up, to deal with specific concerns of the citizens and become "training grounds". In 1951, van Waardenburg created three councils, along with a “National Education Council” which included members of Christian missions.

== Tenure ==
Van Waardenburg’s plans were ambitious. The commission recommended that an overall plan should be adopted having as its first priority to rapidly bring the whole territory under direct Dutch colonial control. Secondly, it should accelerate the spread of education, health, proper housing and agricultural extension services. Third, it should speedily open up more opportunities for Papuans to be appointed to the public service, including the judiciary. The commission also believed that the introduction of western village councils and courts would be more useful tools to create national unity than genealogical-based institutions.

Under his tenure, van Waardenburg began a concerted effort to advance the country and the people of Netherlands New Guinea. Accordingly, the number of pupils in village and urban 3-year elementary schools (teaching the 3 R’s and social skills) increased from 25,791 in 1950 to 32,686 (by 1960). The number of Papuan pupils in advanced primary schools increased from 804 to 2,734 (by 1960). The number of Papuans in teacher training courses grew from 95 to 404 (by 1960). The number of Papuans in technical schools grew from 70 to 212 (by 1960). The number of Papuans in secondary schools grew from 20 to 430 (by 1960). By 1960 there were 29 Papuans studying in the Netherlands.

To advance self-reliance and national identity for the citizens of the colony, almost half of the 24 districts would eventually be run by Papuan patrol officers. In addition, the number of Papuans in the Civil Service grew to 1,290 (by 1956).

During van Waardenburg’s tenure, the well known member of Indonesian Irian Independence Party Marcus Indey was released in March 1950, having been imprisoned since 1946. Though somewhat stifled, anti-Dutch rebellion and agitation which had escalated after 1945, continued. As such, military reinforcements were sent from Biak to prevent possible anti-government actions.

Netherlands New Guinea was still recovering from the war. Conditions could be primitive at times. Van Waardenburg would often serve in the capacity of judge to resolve local or regional issues and trials. However, his civil service background and time spent in the region – and nearby – provided van Waardenburg with the skills to handle a multitude of official and governmental affairs. He became a Knight of the Order of the Dutch Lion on 29 January 1953.

Van Waardenburg’s four year appointment and tenure ended in 1953. The successor and second appointed governor of Netherlands New Guinea was Jan van Baal, an anthropologist who had spent considerable time in West New Guinea. His term was from 1953 to 1957.

== Retirement ==
Upon completion of his appointment, Van Waardenburg retired from politics and government duties in 1953, and he along with his wife Lucy Mathilde, and their children, Maud, Tjoet and Hettie, returned to The Hague, Netherlands. The family resided at Juliana van Stolberglaan in Den Haag (The Hague), occupying the third and fourth floor flats of a Dutch townhouse. He remained mentally active and a loyal citizen of the Netherlands. From there he would see his daughters married: Maud to Siward Ypma Sr. in 1956; Tjoet to Raymond Pierre; and Hettie to Harry Roos, and he would learn of the births of seven grandchildren. He remained in retirement with Lucy Mathilde for his remaining years. Also in the Netherlands was his daughter, Hettie, her husband and three children. Stephan and Lucy Mathilde would make trips to the United States to spend time with his daughters Tjoet, her husband and two children in Mississippi and their daughter, Maud, her husband and their two children in Pennsylvania. They would be visited in The Netherlands by his daughters, sons-in-law and grandchildren.

In 1974, during what would be his last trip to the United States, van Waardenburg began to experience pains which would later be determined to be cancer. They returned to The Hague, where he died on 4 April 1975.
