= Dutch New Guinea =

1949–1962 Dutch possession in Oceania

Dutch New Guinea Nederlands-Nieuw-Guinea (Dutch) Nugini Belanda (Indonesian)
- 1949–1962
- Flag of the Netherlands; Morning Star flag (1961–1962) Coat of arms (1961–1962)
- Motto: Setia, Djudjur, Mesra (Indonesian); Pius, Honestus, Amica (Latin) "Loyal, Honest, Affectionate"
- Anthem: "Wilhelmus van Nassouwe" (Dutch) (English: "'William of Nassau") "Hai Tanahku Papua" (Indonesian) (English: "Oh My Land Papua")
- Map of the Dutch possession in the New Guinea
- Status: Colony of the Netherlands (1949–1954); Overseas territory of the Kingdom of the Netherlands (1954–1962)
- Capital: Hollandia
- Common languages: Dutch; Papuan Malay; Papuan languages Austronesian languages
- Religion: Christianity; Papuan religion Islam
- Monarch
  - 1949–1962: Juliana
- Governor
  - 1950–1953 (first): Stephan Lucien Joseph van Waardenburg
  - 1958–1962 (last): Pieter Johannes Platteel
- Legislature: New Guinea Council
- Historical era: Cold War
  - Established: 27 December 1949
  - Disestablished: 1 October 1962

Area
  - Total: 421,981 km^{2} (162,928 sq mi)

Population
  - 1955: 321,000
- Currency: NNG gulden
Preceded by	Succeeded by
Dutch East Indies	United Nations Administered West New Guinea
- Today part of: Indonesia

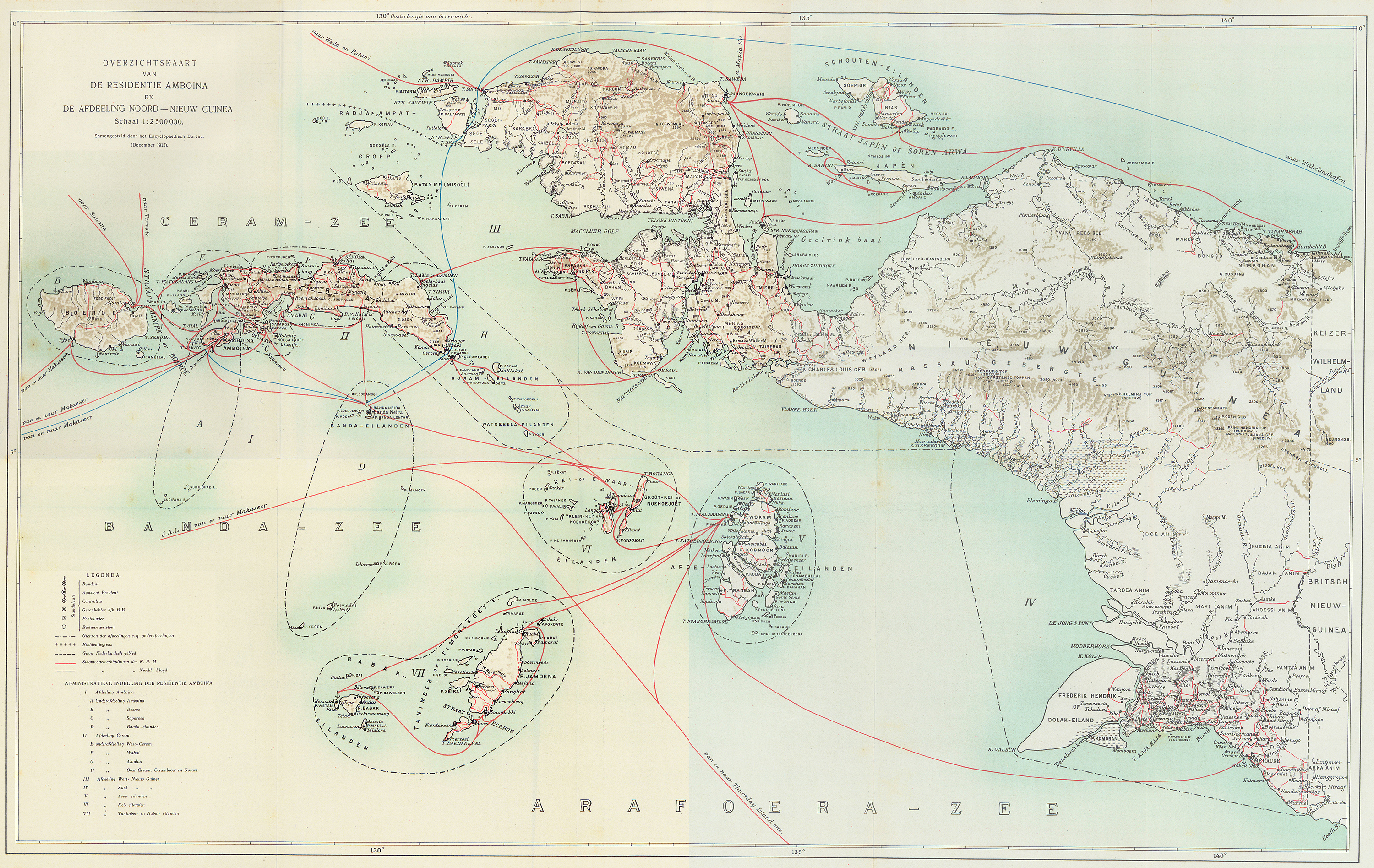
Steamboat connections in Ambon Residence, Dutch East Indies, in 1915.

Dutch New Guinea or Netherlands New Guinea (Dutch: Nederlands-Nieuw-Guinea, Indonesian: Nugini Belanda) was the western half of the island of New Guinea that was a part of the Dutch East Indies until 1949, later an overseas territory of the Kingdom of the Netherlands from 1949 to 1962. It contained what are now Indonesia's six easternmost provinces, Central Papua, Highland Papua, Papua, South Papua, Southwest Papua, and West Papua, which were administered as a single province prior to 2003 under the name Irian Jaya, and now comprise the Papua region of the country.

During the Indonesian Revolution, the Dutch launched politionele acties to capture territory from the Indonesian Republic. The harsh methods of the Dutch drew international disapproval. With international opinion shifting towards support of the Indonesian Republic, the Dutch managed in 1949 to negotiate for the separation of Dutch New Guinea from the broader Indonesian settlement, with the fate of the disputed territory to be decided by the close of 1950. The Dutch in the coming years stated at the UN that the indigenous population of Dutch New Guinea represented a separate ethnic group from the people of Indonesia and thus should not be absorbed into the Indonesian state. The Indonesian Republic, as successor state to the Netherlands East Indies, claimed Dutch New Guinea as part of its natural territorial bounds. The dispute over New Guinea was an important factor in the quick decline in bilateral relations between the Netherlands and Indonesia after Indonesian independence. The dispute escalated into low-level conflict in 1962 following Dutch moves in 1961 to establish a New Guinea Council.

Following the Vlakke Hoek incident, Indonesia launched a campaign of infiltrations designed to place pressure on the Dutch. Facing diplomatic pressure from the United States, fading domestic support and continual Indonesian threats to invade the territory, the Netherlands decided to relinquish control of the disputed territory in August 1962, agreeing to the Bunker Proposal on condition that a referendum to determine the final fate of the territory be conducted at a later date. The territory was administered by the UN temporarily before being transferred to Indonesia on 1 May 1963. A plebiscite, the Act of Free Choice, was eventually held in 1969, but the fairness of the election is disputed.

== Pre-World War II ==
Before 1898, Papuans lived in isolated, competitive, and autonomous clan and tribal environments. In 1898, the Dutch came and established their presence. Their claim, which was made in 1848, was based on the Sultanate of Ternate's claim on Papua based on Ternatean tributary relation. The Dutch first divided Papua into two afdeelings: Afdeeling Noord-Nieuw-Guinea (Manokwari), and Afdeeling West-En-Zuid-Nieuw-Guinea (Fakfak), both led by controleurs under the Residentie Ternate. The afdeelings were led by controleurs normally responsible for onderafdeeling instead of the usual asistent-resident due to newly established nature of the land. The colonial government set Tanjung Goede Hoop or Jamoer Seba (Yamursba) as the boundary of the two afdeeling

In 1901 to subdue the headhunting Ugeris and increase colonial control, Afdeeling West-En-Zuid-Nieuw-Guinea was split into Afdeeling West-Nieuw-Guinea and Afdeeling Zuid-New-Guinea. Afdeeling West-Nieuw-Guinea consisted of the part of Dutch New Guinea from Cape Jamoer Seba to Cape Steenboom and surrounding islands, including the group of Radja Ampat, under a Controller at Fakfak. While Afdeeling Zuid-New-Guinea consisted of the part of Dutch New Guinea from Cape Steenboom to the mouth of the Bensbach river and surrounding islands, under an assistent-resident with a to be determined capital. Later it would be Merauke which was founded on 12 February 1902 for the express purpose of being the capital.

Since their creation, Afdeeling West-Nieuw-Guinea would remain part of the Residentie Ternate until it was transferred into Residentie Amboina in 1911. While the Afdeeling Zuid-Nieuw-Guinea would be an independent afdeeling until it was put under Residentie Amboina in 1913.

In 1920, the three Afdeelings were made into its own residentie Nieuw Guinea. However it did not last as in August 1923 the Governor-General decided to merge the residency into Residentie Amboina. It followed the fate of Residentie Ternate which was also merged into Residentie Amboina in 1922. The merging process was done on 1 April 1924. The Afdeelings themselves were kept the same at the time.

In 1925, the status of the Residentie Amboina was upgraded to the Gouvernement der Molukken, which was divided into two residencies, namely Residentie Amboina and Residentie Ternate. Six onderafdeelings of New Guinea (Manokwari, Sorong, Schouteneilanden, Jappengroep, Hollandia dan West-Nieuw Guinea) were under the Residentie Ternate. While only one, the Onderafdeeling of Zuid-Nieuw Guinea was under the Residentie Amboina. The reduction in the status of the three afdeelings in Papua to onderafdeeling, and before that the Residentie Nieuw Guinea into Amboina, was caused by the decline in the regional income since the ban of hunting Cendrawasih in 1922.

In 1934, the status of the Gouvernement der Molukken was downgraded into Residentie der Molukken. The residency oversaw Afdeeling Ternate, Ambon, Tual, and North and West New Guinea. The Onderafdeeling Zuid-Nieuw-Guinea and Onderafdeeling Boven Digul were placed under Afdeeling Tual. Afdeeling Noord-Nieuw-Guinea and Afdeeling West-Nieuw-Guinea were combined into one afdeeling called Afdeeling Noord-En-West-New Guinea which oversaw 5 onderafdeeling namely Manokwari, Sorong, Serui, Hollandia and Fak-Fak.

In 1936 the Dutch colonial government shuffled a new territorial division in the residency. The residency was divided into two afdeelings, namely the Afdeeling Noord-Nieuw-Guinea which oversaw 5 onderafdeelings (Manokwari, Sorong, Central Vogelkop, Serui and Hollandia); and the West-En-Zuid-Nieuw Guinea Afdeeling also oversaw 5 onderafdeeling (Fak-Fak, Inanwatan, Mimika, Boven Digul and South Nieuw Guinea)

In 1937 Onderafdeeling Boven Digul and Onderafdeeling Zuid-Nieuw-Guinea were placed back under Afdeeling Tual. The Afdeeling West-Niuew-Guinea was separated from the afdeeling of Zuid-Niuew-Guinea. Both Afdeling Noord-Niuew-Guinea and Afdeling West-Niuew-Guinea oversaw 4 onderafdeeling each. Afdeling North New Guinea oversaw Fak-Fak, Central Vogelkop, Inanwatan and Mimika, while Afdeeling West New Guinea oversaw Manokwari, Sorong, Serui and Hollandia. The return of West Guinea's Afdeeling status was related to the increase in private oil exploration activities carried out by the Nederlandsche Nieuw Guinea Petroleum Maatschappij (NNGPM) in Babo which began its activities in New Guinea on 23 April 1935.

In 1938, Gouvernement Groote Oost was created to encompass all Dutch East Indies residencies east of Java and Kalimantan.

In 1940 there was another shuffle, and Afdeeling Noord-Niuew-Guinea oversaw five onderafdeeling, namely Manokwari, Sorong, Serui, Sarmi and Hollandia. West New Guinea included three onderafdeelings, namely Fak-Fak, Inanwatan and Mimika. While Onderafdeeling Boven Digul and Onderafdeeling Zuid-Nieuw-Guinea were placed under Afdeeling of Tual.

Until after World War II, the western part of the island of New Guinea was part of the Great East (Groote Oost) governorate of the Dutch East Indies. The Netherlands claimed sovereignty over New Guinea within the colony through its protection over the Sultanate of Tidore, a sultanate on an island west of Halmahera in the Maluku Islands. In a 1660 treaty, the Dutch East India Company (VOC) recognised the Sultanate of Tidore's supremacy over the Papuan people, the inhabitants of New Guinea. Probably this referred to some Papuan islands (Raja Ampat) near the Maluku Islands as well as coastal areas like Fakfak, through familial relations with local rulers, although Tidore never exercised actual control over the interior and highlands of New Guinea. In 1872, Tidore recognised Dutch sovereignty and granted permission to the Kingdom of the Netherlands to establish administration in its territories whenever the Netherlands Indies authorities would want to do so. This allowed the Netherlands to legitimise a claim to the New Guinea area.

The Dutch established the 141st meridian as the eastern frontier of the territory. In 1898, the Netherlands Indies government decided to establish administrative posts in Fakfak and Manokwari, followed by Merauke in 1902. The main reason for this was the expansion of British and German interests in the east. The Dutch wanted to make sure the United Kingdom and Germany would not move the border to the west. This resulted in the partition of the island of New Guinea.

In reality, most of New Guinea remained outside colonial influence. Little was known about the interior; large areas on the map were white and the number of inhabitants of the island was unknown, and numerous explorations were made into the interior from the turn of the 20th century on. The indigenous inhabitants of New Guinea were Papuans, living in tribes. They were hunter-gatherers.

Pre-World War II economic activity was limited. Only coastal and island dwellers traded to some extent, mostly with the Maluku Islands. A development company was founded in 1938 to change this situation, but it was not very active. So, until World War II, New Guinea was a disregarded and unimportant territory within the Netherlands Indies.

=== Homeland for the Eurasians ===
The group that was most interested in New Guinea before the war were the Eurasians or Indo people. Before the war, some 150,000 to 200,000 Eurasians were living in the Netherlands Indies. They were of mixed European and Indonesian descent and identified with the Netherlands and the Dutch way of life. In the colonial society of the Netherlands Indies, they held a higher social status than indigenous Indonesians ("inlanders"). They were mostly employed as office workers. As the educational level of indigenous Indonesians was on the rise, more and more Indonesians got jobs previously held by Eurasians. These had no other means of making a living, because, as Europeans, they were forbidden to buy land on Java. This situation caused mental and economic problems to the Eurasians. In 1923, the first plan to designate New Guinea as a settlement territory for Eurasians was devised. In 1926, a separate Vereniging tot Kolonisatie van Nieuw-Guinea (Association for the Settlement of New Guinea) was founded. In 1930, it was followed by the Stichting Immigratie Kolonisatie Nieuw-Guinea (Foundation Immigration and Settlement New Guinea). These organisations regarded New Guinea as an untouched, almost empty land that could serve as a homeland to the sidelined Eurasians, a kind of tropical Holland, where Eurasians could create an existence.

These associations succeeded in sending settlers to New Guinea and lobbied successfully for the establishment of a government agency to subsidise these initiatives (in 1938). However, most settlements ended in failure because of the harsh climate and natural conditions, and because of the fact the settlers, previously office workers, were not skilled in agriculture. The number of settlers remained small. In the Netherlands proper, some organisations existed that promoted a kind of "tropical Holland" in New Guinea, but they were rather marginal. They were linked to the NSB party and other fascist organisations.

== Administrative divisions ==
Departments of Papua
Department	Capital	1955 Population
1. Hollandia	Hollandia	57,000
2. Geelvinkbaai	Biak	78,000
3. Centraal Nieuw-Guinea	Wamena	52,000
4. Zuid Nieuw-Guinea	Merauke	78,000
5. Fak-Fak	Fak-Fak	28,000
6. West Nieuw-Guinea	Sorong-Doom	95,000
Total:	--	420,000

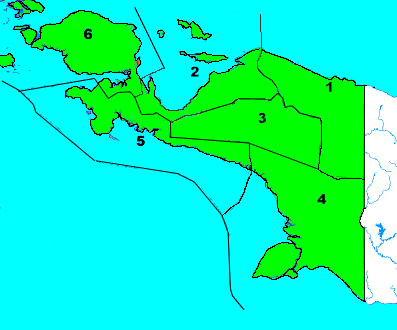
Departments of Papua

== Origin of the dispute over New Guinea ==
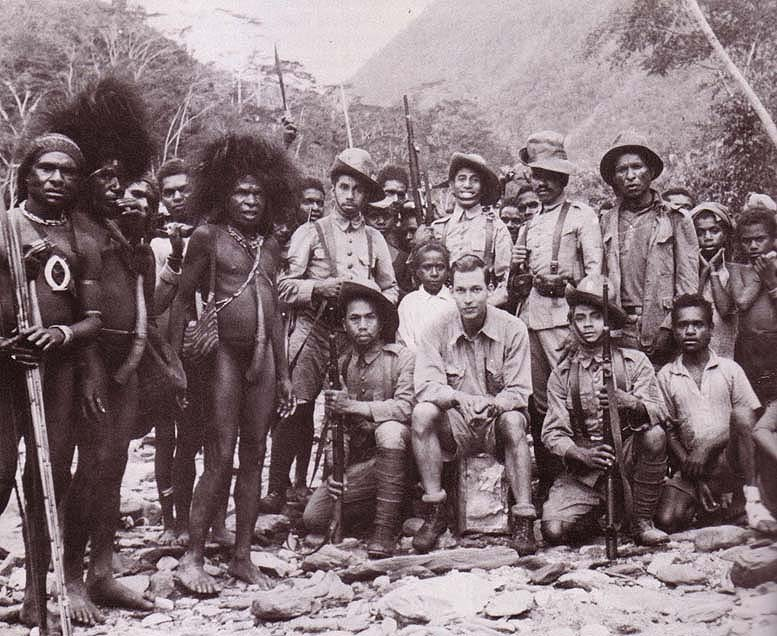
Dutch district officer Jean Victor de Bruijn, with Moluccan police and highland companions, on patrol east of Beoga, c. 1941

In 1942, most parts of the Netherlands Indies were occupied by Japan. Behind Japanese lines in New Guinea, Dutch guerrilla fighters resisted under Mauritz Christiaan Kokkelink. During the occupation the Indonesian nationalist movement went through a rapid development. After Japan's surrender, Sukarno issued the Proclamation of Indonesian Independence, which was to encompass the whole of the Netherlands Indies. The Dutch authorities returned after several months under the leadership of Lieutenant-Governor-General Hubertus van Mook. Van Mook decided to reform Indonesia on a federal basis. This was not a completely new idea, but it was contrary to the administrative practice in the Netherlands Indies until then and contrary to the ideas of the nationalists, who wanted a centralist Indonesia.

=== Linggadjati agreement ===
The ethnic diversity of Indonesia was initially discussed at two conferences in Malino and Pangkalpinang. During the Pangkalpinang conference, the right of self-determination of the Eurasian, Chinese, and Arab ethnic minorities was discussed. The new Grooter Nederland-Actie (Extended Netherlands Action) sent delegates to this conference, who opined that New Guinea should be declared as separate entities in a similar manner to Suriname. Furthermore, this conference stipulated specific territories could have special relations with the Kingdom of the Netherlands if they wanted to.

Van Mook's plan was to divide Indonesia into several federal states, negaras, with possible autonomous areas, daerahs. The whole would be called the United States of Indonesia and would remain linked to the Netherlands in the Netherlands-Indonesian Union. The Indonesian side agreed to this plan during the Linggadjati conference in November 1946. Van Mook thought a federal structure would safeguard Indonesia's cultural and ethnic diversity. Van Mook and his supporters referred to the right of self-determination in this respect: the different ethnic communities of Indonesia should have the right to govern themselves.

=== The unilateral amendment of 'Linggadjati' ===
To many Dutchmen, the idea of parting with Indonesia was shocking. Many Dutch thought their country had a mission to develop Indonesia. The Indonesian wish for independence to many Dutch came as a complete surprise. Because Indonesian nationalists, which had no electoral or official legitimacy—save ethno-state nationalism, under Sukarno cooperated with the Japanese, they were branded as traitors and collaborators. Almost every Dutch political party was against Indonesian independence. The Protestant Anti-Revolutionary Party (ARP) were very supportive of the Dutch Ethical Policy in Indonesia. The newly established liberal People's Party for Freedom and Democracy campaigned for a hard-line policy against the nationalists. Even the Labour Party, which supported Indonesian independence in principle, was hesitant, because of the policies of Sukarno.

Minister of Colonies Jan Anne Jonkman defended the Linggadjati Agreement in Parliament in 1946 by stating that the government wished for New Guinea to remain under Dutch sovereignty, arguing it could be a settlement for Eurasians. A motion entered by the Catholic People's Party (KVP) and the Labour Party, which was accepted by parliament, stated that the declaration of Jonkman in parliament should become a part of the Linggadjati agreement. Duly accepted, the Netherlands thus unilaterally 'amended' the Linggadjati agreement to the effect that New Guinea would remain Dutch. Labour parliamentary group leader Marinus van der Goes van Naters said afterwards the Labour Party entered the motion with the KVP because it feared the Catholics otherwise might reject the Linggadjati agreements.

The Indonesians did not accept this unilateral amendment. In order not to jeopardise the scheduled transfer of sovereignty, the Indonesian vice-president Mohammad Hatta offered to maintain Dutch sovereignty over New Guinea for one year and reopen the negotiations afterwards.

== 1949–1956 ==
Thus in 1949, when the rest of the Dutch East Indies became fully independent as Indonesia, the Dutch retained sovereignty over western New Guinea, and took steps to prepare it for independence as a separate country. Some five thousand teachers were flown there. The Dutch put an emphasis upon political, business, and civic skills. On 8 February 1950, Stephan Lucien Joseph van Waardenburg was appointed the first Governor (De Gouverneur) of Dutch New Guinea. The first local naval cadets graduated in 1955 and the first army brigade become operational in 1956.

== 1957–1961 ==
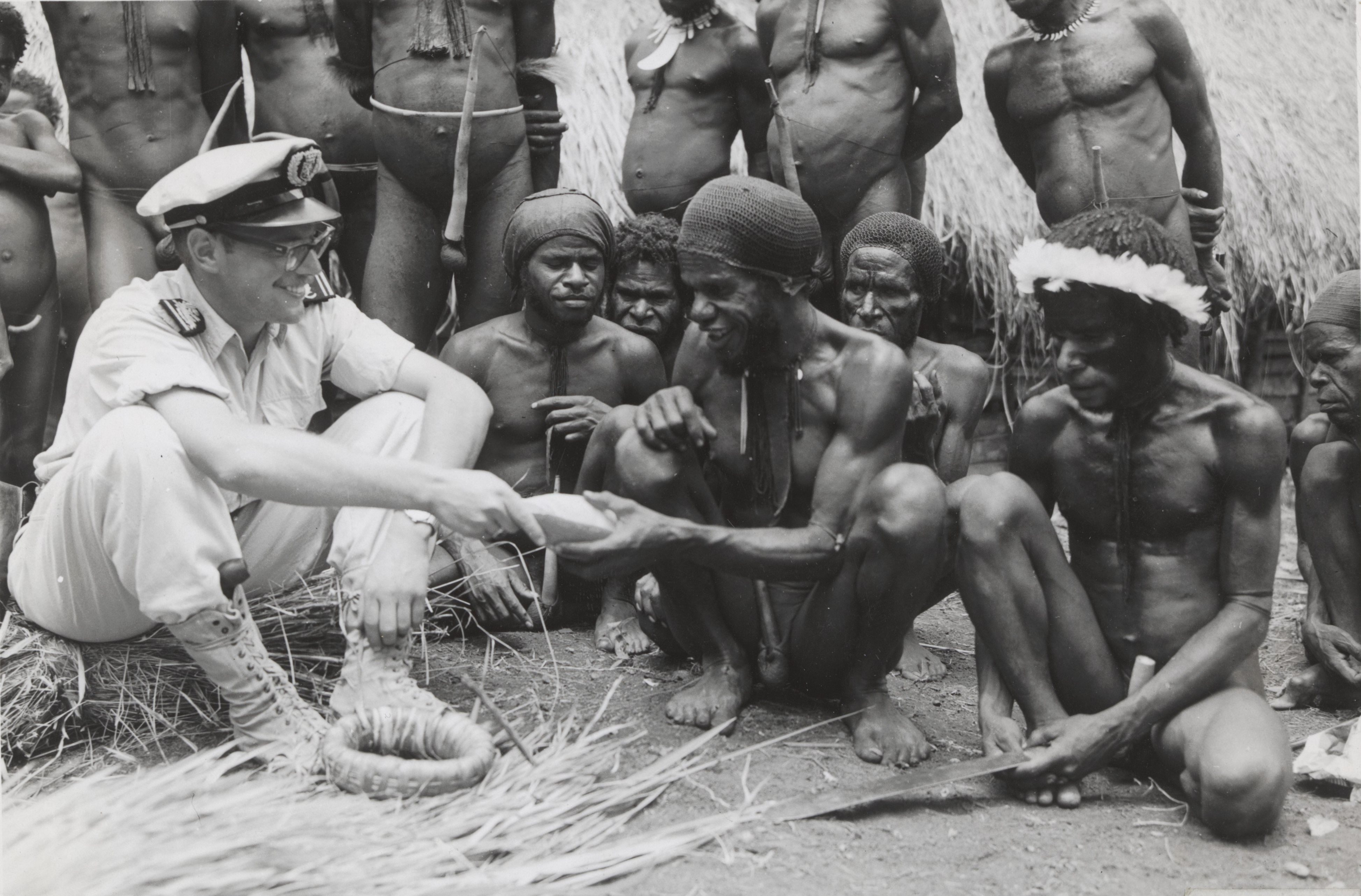
Dutch colonial civil servant in the Baliem Valley, 1958

Tensions regarding the Dutch-Indonesian dispute over Dutch New Guinea escalated in December 1957 following Indonesia's defeat in the UN General Assembly on 29 November 1957 to pass a resolution in favour of Indonesia's claim to the territory. Sukarno responded by allowing the seizure of Dutch enterprises operating in Indonesia and announcing the intended expulsion of Dutch residents from Indonesia. The increased tensions surrounding the dispute encouraged the Dutch to accelerate their plans to move the disputed territory towards an act of self-determination. Elections were held in January 1961 and the New Guinea Council officially took office on 5 April 1961, to prepare for full independence by the end of that decade. The Dutch endorsed the council's selection of a new national anthem and the Morning Star as the new national flag on 1 December 1961.

Following the raising of the Papuan National Flag on 1 December 1961, tensions further escalated. On 19 December 1961, Sukarno issued the Tri Komando Rakjat (People's Triple Command), calling the Indonesian people to defeat the formation of an independent state of West Papua, raise the Indonesian flag in that country, and be ready for mobilisation at any time.

=== 'Tarzan' Fomenko ===
On 11 December 1959, Georgian-born Australian amateur ocean rower Michael 'Tarzan' Fomenko (c.1930–2018) was "washed ashore" near Merauke having paddled a dugout canoe from Queensland for months, stopping at the islands of the Torres Strait for supplies. Australian papers such as The Canberra Times had followed his progress throughout. Upon arrival at Merauke, he was found to have "no money, passport or other papers" and his vessel deemed "unseaworthy".

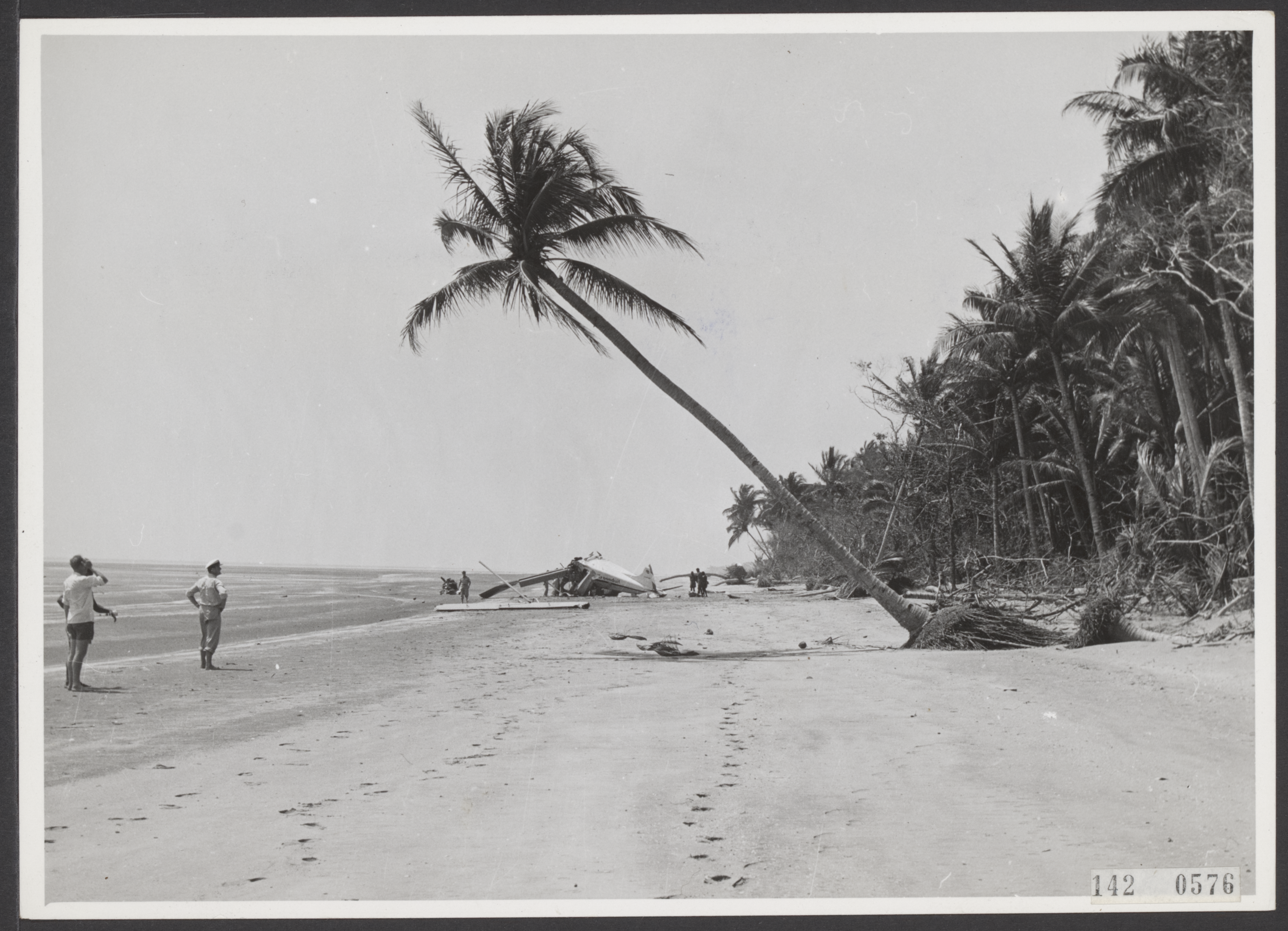
A beach near Merauke, then part of Dutch New Guinea, in 1957

Fomenko was adamant to continue another 600 miles to reach then-Australian New Guinea, but Dutch authorities in Sydney advised that it would be "suicide" to allow him to leave the town in his canoe to attempt the journey. A spokesperson for the Australian Department of Territories told the Canberra Times that it was "most unlikely" that Fomenko would even be granted permission to enter Australian New Guinea Territories anyway, as he would have to "conform to the usual requirements" to do so, and would be required to "hold a return ticket to Australia, have accommodation and employment or a bond to ensure that he would not become a charge on the Administration." After some diplomatic liaising, Fomenko was eventually repatriated to Sydney via a KLM flight on 9 February 1960.

== Since 1962 ==
=== Escalation to low-level conflict ===
In 1962 Indonesia launched a significant campaign of airborne and seaborne infiltrations against the disputed territory, beginning with a seaborne infiltration launched by Indonesian forces on 15 January 1962. The Indonesian attack was comprehensively defeated by Dutch forces including the Dutch destroyers Evertsen and Kortenaer, the so-called Vlakke Hoek incident. Amongst the casualties was the Indonesian Deputy Chief of the Naval Staff; Commodore Yos Sudarso. Unbeknown to the Indonesians, Dutch Signals Intelligence had been able to intercept Indonesian communications, allowing Dutch forces to successfully anticipate Indonesia's infiltration attempts throughout 1962. Forced to regroup, the Indonesians relaunched their campaign of infiltrations in March 1962. In the coming months over 500 Indonesian paratroops and special forces were covertly inserted into Dutch New Guinea, only to be decisively defeated by Dutch forces with the assistance of the indigenous population.

=== Ellsworth Bunker proposal ===
Facing mounting international diplomatic pressure and the prospect of an Indonesian invasion force, the Dutch conceded to re-entering negotiations and agreed to the Ellsworth Bunker proposal on 28 July 1962, for a staged transition from Dutch to Indonesian control via UN administration, on the condition that a plebiscite would be held in future in the territory. The agreement was signed on 15 August 1962 at the UN Headquarters in New York and the territory was placed under the United Nations Temporary Executive Authority in October 1962. It was subsequently transferred to Indonesia in May 1963.

The territory formally became part of Indonesia in 1969 after the Indonesian government, who shifted to New Order under President Suharto starting from 1966, conducted a nominally Bunker proposal-based plebiscite termed the Act of Free Choice. The result, which under strong pressure from the military, unanimously wanted to become part of Indonesia. The UN General Assembly later acknowledged the result via the UN Resolution 2504.

== Governors ==
- Jan Pieter Karel van Eechoud (29 December 1949 – 8 February 1950; acting)
- Stephan Lucien Joseph van Waardenburg (8 February 1950 – 24 April 1953)
- Jan van Baal (24 April 1953 – 31 March 1958)
- Jan Christoffel Baarspul (31 March 1958 – 1 May 1958; acting)
- Pieter Johannes Platteel (1 May 1958 – 28 September 1962)
- Henk Veldkamp (28 September 1962 – 1 October 1962; acting)

== See also ==
- Free Papua Movement
- German New Guinea
- Kaiser-Wilhelmsland
- New Guinea
- Operation Trikora
- Papua (Indonesian province)
- Papua Conflict
- Territory of New Guinea
- West New Guinea dispute
- West Papua (province)
- Western New Guinea
