= Wolani people =

Ethnic group in Indonesia

Wolani people Wodani people
Total population
- 6,920

Regions with significant populations
- Indonesia (Central Papua)

Languages
- Wolani language, Indonesian language

Religion
- Animism (predominantly), Christianity

Related ethnic groups
- Ekari people, Moni people

The Wolani or Wodani are an ethnic group in the Indonesian Paniai Regency of the Central Papua Province in Western New Guinea. Numbering about 5000 in 1992, they are farmers who live in the central highlands northeast of Lake Paniai, along the Kemandoga and Mbiyandogo rivers. Many Wolani converted to Christianity but, like elsewhere in Indonesia, they retain their traditional religion. They speak Wolani, which is affiliated with the western branch of the Trans–New Guinea languages, similar to the nearby Ekari and Moni languages.

== Representations in Media ==
- The Wolani Shells is a 2005 film by British filmmaker Alastair Kenneil. In 2005, National Geographic aired the film as Tribal Odyssey: the Wolani Shells (Season 1, Episode 2 of its Tribal Odyssey series).
- A Wolani song, Troisième soirée, Les Wolani à Ebugangwe - Yohi-Yaya-O, calme, appears in a collection of regional music, Les Dani de Nouvelle Guinée Volume 1.

== See also ==
- Indigenous people of New Guinea
- Stéphane Breton (filmmaker)
