= Kapiraya conflict =

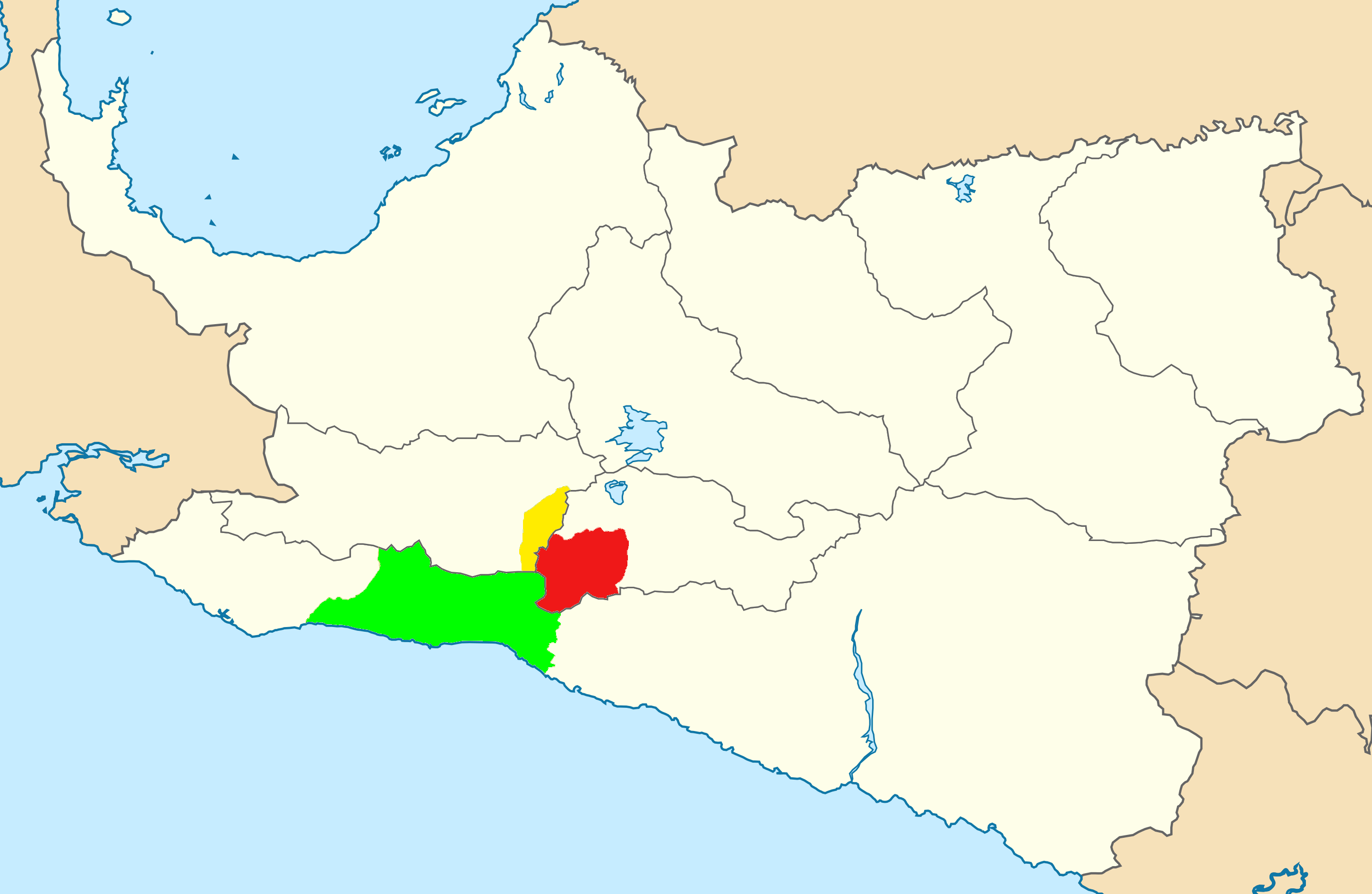
- Districts in Central Papua containing Kapiraya, including Kapiraya (red), Central West Mimika (green) and South Kamu (yellow).
- Date: c. 2023 – present
- Location: Kapiraya, Central Papua, Indonesia
- Caused by: Boundary dispute between Deiyai, Dogiyai, Mimika; Illegal mining and logging activities

Casualties
- Death: 1
- Injuries: 10+

The Kapiraya conflict (Indonesian: Konflik Kapiraya) is an ongoing boundary dispute in Central Papua between the regencies of Deiyai, Mimika, and Dogiyai. It is centered around administrative boundaries in the Kapiraya area, split between the three regencies. The region is inhabited by the Mee and Kamoro tribes.

Although the border dispute originated from the formation of new administrative areas, it escalated into tribal clashes upon the discovery of gold deposits in the Kapiraya region in 2023, with both external illegal mining activities and local traditional miners disputing gold-containing areas. The conflict increased in violence in late 2025 and 2026 resulting in injuries and a death, leading to increased government intervention.

== Background ==
The Mee and Kamoro peoples are among the indigenous inhabitants of Indonesia's Central Papua province. The Kamoro largely inhabit the administrative area of Mimika Regency, while the Mee inhabit areas such as Deiyai and Dogiyai. The Kapiraya area, inhabited by both Mee and Kamoro peoples, was split between Deiyai (as Kapiraya district), Dogiyai (as part of the South Kamu district), and Mimika (as part of the Central West Mimika district) during the breakup of administrative units in Papua.

Around January 2023, gold deposits were discovered in the villages of Mogodagi and Wakia, which were located roughly at the tribal boundary of the Mee and Kamoro peoples. Inhabitants of the two villages had previously engaged in tribal conflict in 2022 (Mogodagi was a Mee village, and Wakia a Kamoro one). Initially, informal mining activities were conducted by locals, which was soon followed by larger operations without permission from either local tribes or local governments. Prior to gold mining, extensive illegal logging activities had also occurred in the region.

== Conflict ==
Starting in 2023, clashes in the Kapiraya region began to erupt over illegal mining activities, involving both corporate illegal mining and disputes by traditional miners over gold-containing areas. Throughout 2024, Papuan figures began calling for government intervention to prevent the dispute from escalating into a tribal war. On 28 August 2024, a group of unknown attackers burned down houses in Wakia (in Mimika), causing 157 households to flee the village. According to a Papuan human rights group, a village chief in Kapiraya was shot in the hand by a Babinsa Indonesian Army personnel for rejecting mining operations in his village in February 2025.

During a clash on 24 November 2025, a mob numbering hundreds of people attacked the Mee-inhabited village of Mogodagi, burning down a church and killing Neles Peuki, a local priest. Six further villagers were seriously injured, with damage to Kapiraya's airstrip and several houses also burned down. Around 600 people from 115 families were displaced. Another four villagers were reportedly injured in a clash in February 2026, during which the district office of Kapiraya in Deiyai was burned down. The February clash resulted in the closure of Kapiraya's airstrip, causing concerns for access to emergency health services and food supply in the region.

== Reaction ==
After the conflict's flareup in February 2026, Central Papua's governor Meki Nawipa called for the border dispute to be settled with the participation of Kapiraya's residents, and for residents of the regencies who lived outside Kapiraya to not be involved in the dispute. Nawipa further ordered the regents of Mimika, Deiyai and Dogiyai to form a joint team to resolve the border dispute. The provincial police chief, Jeremias Rontini, ordered all heavy mining equipment to be removed from Kapiraya.

The Indonesian Forum for Environment (WALHI) accused a "third party" of inciting the conflict in order to seize traditionally-held land for illegal mining activities.
