= Moanemani =

Coordinates: 4°0′25″S 136°2′16″E

Kamu Valley and village of Moanemani

Moanemani is a village in the Kamu district of the Dogiyai Regency, Central Papua, Indonesia. It is located in the fertile Kamu Valley, a dry lake bed west of the Paniai lakes region. The indigenous residents are speakers of Mee. Moanemani is a major center for coffee production in Papua. There is a local airport named the Moanamani airport.

== State conflict ==
In September 2012, the Indonesian army swept through the local area in search of a Free Papua Movement leader. Witnesses reported that troops forced villagers to shave and warned them to wear clean and new clothing.

In May 2014, a truck ran over a group of church pilgrims, critically wounding three. The truck driver took refuge in the local Moanemani Brimob post. Riots ensued demanding the state release of the truck driver, although police refused.

== Climate ==
Moanemani has a subtropical highland climate (Cfb) with heavy rainfall year-round.

Climate data for Moanemani
Month	Jan	Feb	Mar	Apr	May	Jun	Jul	Aug	Sep	Oct	Nov	Dec	Year
Mean daily maximum °C (°F)	24.7 (76.5)	24.7 (76.5)	24.3 (75.7)	23.9 (75.0)	23.1 (73.6)	21.9 (71.4)	20.9 (69.6)	21.1 (70.0)	22.1 (71.8)	23.5 (74.3)	24.4 (75.9)	24.7 (76.5)	23.3 (73.9)
Daily mean °C (°F)	19.6 (67.3)	19.7 (67.5)	19.5 (67.1)	19.4 (66.9)	18.9 (66.0)	18.1 (64.6)	17.4 (63.3)	17.5 (63.5)	17.9 (64.2)	18.9 (66.0)	19.4 (66.9)	19.7 (67.5)	18.8 (65.9)
Mean daily minimum °C (°F)	14.6 (58.3)	14.7 (58.5)	14.8 (58.6)	14.9 (58.8)	14.8 (58.6)	14.4 (57.9)	14.0 (57.2)	13.9 (57.0)	13.8 (56.8)	14.3 (57.7)	14.4 (57.9)	14.7 (58.5)	14.4 (58.0)
Average precipitation mm (inches)	247 (9.7)	313 (12.3)	254 (10.0)	269 (10.6)	295 (11.6)	329 (13.0)	336 (13.2)	329 (13.0)	295 (11.6)	247 (9.7)	228 (9.0)	217 (8.5)	3,359 (132.2)
Source: Climate-Data.org
