= Ekari =

Ekari may refer to:

- Ekari people, a people of the Indonesian province of Papua
- Ekari language, the language of the Ekari people
