= Delias toxopei =

Scientific classification
- Kingdom: Animalia
- Phylum: Arthropoda
- Clade: Pancrustacea
- Class: Insecta
- Order: Lepidoptera
- Family: Pieridae
- Genus: Delias
- Species: D. toxopei

Binomial name
- Delias toxopei Roepke, 1955

Species of butterfly

Delias toxopei is a butterfly in the family Pieridae. It was described by Roepke in 1955. It is found in New Guinea.

The wingspan is about 58–65 mm. Adults are similar to Delias eichhorni, but have more black on the upper wings.

== Subspecies ==
- D. t. toxopei (Baliem Valley, Ibele River, Irian Jaya)
- D. t. morosa Roepke, 1955 (Aruba River (Paniai Lakes) and Weyland Mountains, Irian Jaya)
- D. t. uranoi Yagishita, 1993 (Mulia Central Mountains, Irian Jaya)
- D. t. nipsan Mastrigt, 1995 (Nipsan, Irian Jaya)

== Taxonomy ==
toxopei is a member of the Delias eichhorni species group.
