= Wolani language =

Language in Central Papua

Wolani
- Native to: Indonesia
- Region: Central Papua
- Ethnicity: Wolani
- Native speakers: (5,000 cited 1992)
- Language family: Trans–New Guinea: West Trans–New Guinea; Paniai Lakes; Wolani

Language codes
- ISO 639-3: wod
- Glottolog: wola1243

view of Moanamani, Papua

Wolani (Wodani) is a Papuan language spoken by about 5,000 people in the Paniai lakes region of the Indonesian province of Central Papua. It is related to the Moni, Ekari, Auye, and Dao languages and may be related to the Dani languages. Documentation is quite limited.
