= Wolani =

Wolani or Wolane may refer to:

- Wolani people, a people of the Papua province of Indonesia
- Wolani language, the language of the Wolani people
- Wolane people, Ethnic group in Ethiopia
