= Paniai Lakes languages =

Family of Trans–New Guinea languages

Paniai Lakes
- Wissel Lakes
- Geographic distribution: Paniai Lakes and highlands of Papua, Western New Guinea
- Linguistic classification: Trans–New Guinea: West Papuan Highlands (Irian Highlands); Paniai Lakes

Language codes
- Glottolog: pani1259

The Paniai Lakes languages, also known as the Wissel Lakes or Wissel Lakes – Kemandoga River, are a small family of closely related Trans–New Guinea languages spoken in the Paniai Lakes region of the highlands of Western New Guinea in the Paniai Lakes region of Papua. Foley (2003) considers their Trans–New Guinea status to be established.

== Languages ==
The languages are:

- Paniai Lakes languages
  - Moni
  - Central
    - Wolani (Wodani)
    - Ekari (Ekari, Mee)
    - Auye (incl. Dao)

They are most closely related to the Dani languages, Amung and Dem.

== Pronouns ==
Independent pronouns and possessive prefixes are:

	singular	dual	plural
1	*ani, *na-	*ina	*ini, *ni-
2	*aka, *ka-	*ika	*iki
3	*oka, *e-		

== Vocabulary comparison ==
The following basic vocabulary words are from Larson & Larson (1972) and Voorhoeve (1975), as cited in the Trans-New Guinea database.

The words cited constitute translation equivalents, whether they are cognate (e.g. homa, huma for “stone”) or not (e.g. bodiya, usa for “fire”).

gloss	Ekari (Paniai Lake dialect)	Ekari	Moni (Kemandoga dialect)	Moni	Wolani (Upper Mbijandoga dialect)	Wolani
head		migo		muŋagi		moto
hair		iyo		mbagu		elo
eye		peka		seŋgamu		
nose	juma		jange		juma	
tooth	egó	ego	baga	baga	hego	hego
tongue	etá		dabe		debegada	
leg				bado		bado
louse	uka	uka	amu	amu	uka	uka
dog		dodi		home		kawino
pig		ekina		wogo		iŋgina
bird	bedo	bedo	beka	bega	bido	bido
egg		nipo		ŋgeda		
blood	emo	emo	eka	ega	emo	emo
bone	mitoo	mitoo	iwa	iwa	mitoo	mitoo
skin	kadó	kado	ada	ada	ebada	ebada
breast	ama		ama		ama	
tree	pija	piya	bo	bo	pija	piya
man	jame	yame	aka	me	me	me
sun	meuka; tani	tani	emondani	emondani	dame	dame
moon	agoo		tinawi		agoo	
water	uwo	uwo	du	du	uwo	uwo
fire	bodija	bodiya	usa	usa	bida	bida
stone	mogo	mogo	homa	ŋeda	huma	huma
road, path	itá		kejako		hindá	
name	eka	eka	eje	eze	ekada	ekada
eat	nai	nai	nuija	nuya	nona	nona
one	ena; kate	ena; kato	hako	hago	naa	naa
two	wijá	wiya	hija	hiya	wijá	wiya

== Evolution ==
Paniai Lakes reflexes of proto-Trans-New Guinea (pTNG) etyma are:

Ekari language:

- ama ‘breast’ < *amu
- benáî ‘arm’ < *mbena
- modo ‘belly’ < *mundun
- ama ‘breast’ < *amu
- kado ‘skin’ < *k(a,o)(nd,t)apu
- yame ‘louse’ < *niman
- mei- ‘come’ < *me
- wawa ‘father’ < *mbapa
- mana ‘speech, talk’ < *mana ‘instructions’
- tani ‘sun’ < *ketane

Moni language:

- ama ‘breast’ < *amu
- (duku)mudu ‘heart’ < *mundun ‘internal organs, belly’
- ada ‘skin’ < *k(a,o)(nd,t)apu
- pane ‘woman’ < *panV
- timu ‘night’ < *k(i,u)tuma
- homa ‘stone’ < *ka(mb,m)uCV
- usa ‘tree’ < *inda
- me- ‘come’ < *me-
