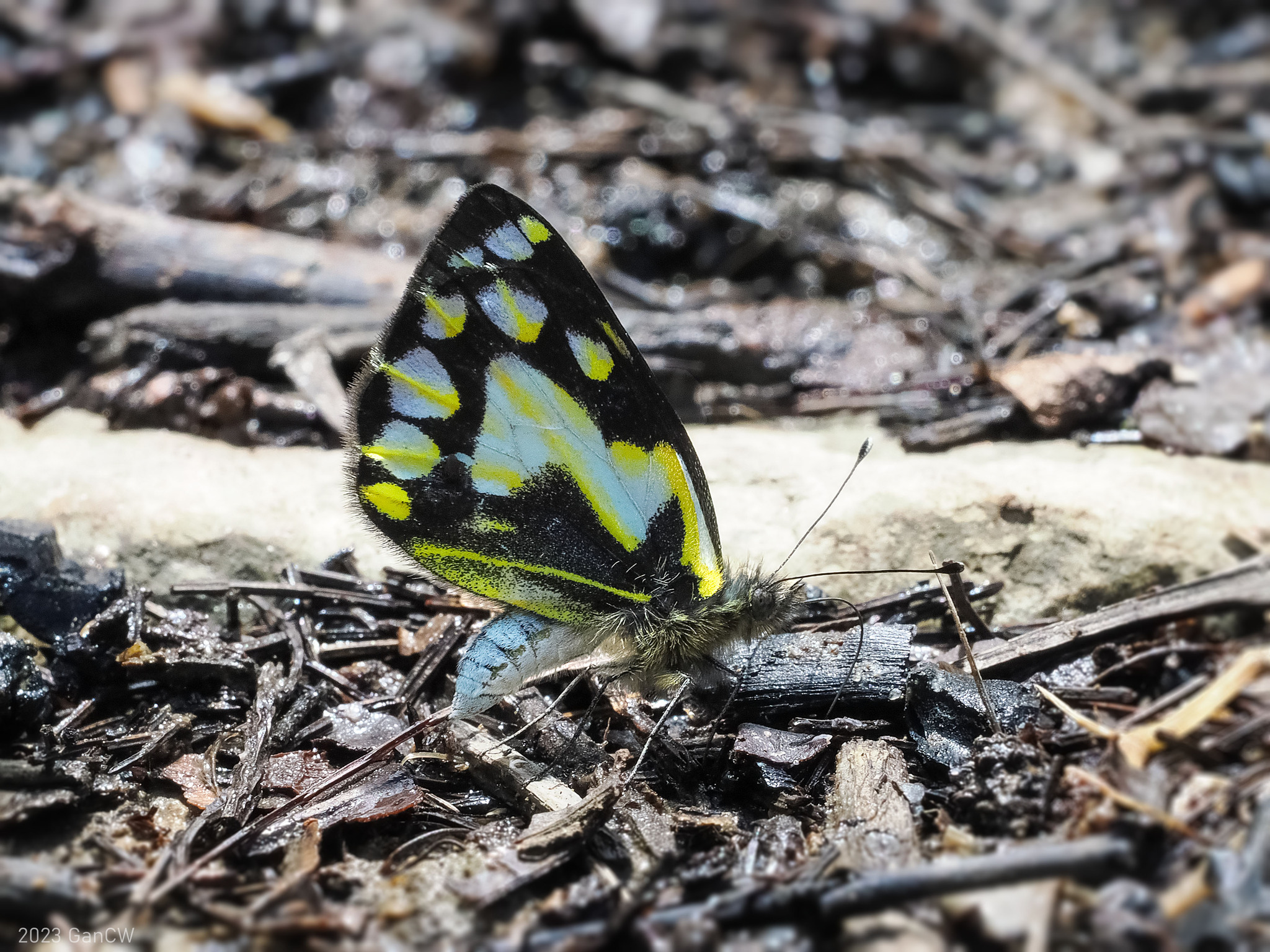

Scientific classification
- Kingdom: Animalia
- Phylum: Arthropoda
- Class: Insecta
- Order: Lepidoptera
- Family: Pieridae
- Genus: Delias
- Species: D. germana

Binomial name
- Delias germana Roepke, 1955

Synonyms
- Delias heliophora Roepke, 1955

= Delias germana =

Species of butterfly

Delias germana is a butterfly in the family Pieridae. It was described by Walter Karl Johann Roepke in 1955. It is found in New Guinea.

The wingspan is about 56 mm. Adults are similar to Delias eichhorni.

== Subspecies ==
- D. g. germana (Central Mountains, Irian Jaya)
- D. g. heliophora Roepke 1955 (Paniaia, Irian Jaya)

== Taxonomy ==
germana is a member of the Delias eichhorni species group.
