= Sempan language =

Language in Indonesia

Sempan
- Native to: Indonesia
- Region: Mimika Regency, Central Papua
- Ethnicity: Sempan
- Native speakers: (1,000 cited 1987)
- Language family: Trans–New Guinea: Asmat–Kamoro; Sempan

Language codes
- ISO 639-3: xse
- Glottolog: semp1241

Sempan is a language spoken by the Sempan people of in Mimika Regency, Central Papua, Western New Guinea, Indonesia.
