= MNZ =

MNZ or mnz may refer to:

- Washington Manassas Airport, USA (by IATA code)
- Museum of New Zealand
- Moni language, spoken in Indonesia (by ISO 639 code)
- Metronidazole, an antibiotic
- Maddie Ziegler, a dancer, and actress
- Mainz, Germany Rheinland-Pfalz
