= Mimika River =

River in Papua, Indonesia

- Location in Central Papua Location in indonesia

Location
- Country: Indonesia
- Province: Central Papua

Physical characteristics
- Source
  - location: Indonesia
- Mouth
  - coordinates: 4.7048°S 136.4625°E

The Mimika River is a river in Western New Guinea, Indonesia, particularly in Mimika Regency, Central Papua. Its name derived from Mimi (water) and Aika (current). The Mimika language is spoken in the region.

== See also ==
- List of drainage basins of Indonesia
- List of rivers of Western New Guinea
- Mimika language
