= Tigi =

- District
- Location of the district in Central Papua Location of the district in Western New Guinea
- Coordinates: 4°2′41.8063″S 136°16′55.2907″E
- Country: Indonesia
- Province: Central Papua
- Regency: Deiyai
- District seat: Waghete I

Area
  - Total: 30.86 km^{2} (11.92 sq mi)

Population (2020)
  - Total: 33,606
  - Density: 1,089/km^{2} (2,820/sq mi)
- Time zone: UTC+9 (WIT)
- Postal Code: 98764
- Climate: Cfb
- Villages: 20

Tigi is an administrative district in Deiyai Regency, Central Papua, Indonesia. Tigi is one of five districts that make up Deiyai Regency in Central Papua Province. Deiyai Regency was formed based on Law of the Republic of Indonesia Number 55 of 2008, which split this area from Paniai Regency. Tigi district is designated as the capital of the regency.

== Geography ==
Tigi district consists of 20 villages (kampung), namely:

- Amago
- Atouda
- Bamou II
- Bomau I
- Bomou III
- Buwoudimi
- Ibodiyo
- Idege
- Ikiyawo
- Motano
- Mugouda
- Okomakebo
- Okomotadi
- Oneibo
- Peku
- Ugiya
- Waghete I
- Waghete II
- Yaba
- Yaba II
