= Damal people =

Ethnic group in Central Papua, Indonesia

Damalme

Regions with significant populations
- Indonesia (Central Papua)

Languages
- Damal-kal, Indonesian language

Religion
- Christianity (predominantly), Animism

Related ethnic groups
- Amung people, Dani people, Delem people, Lani people

The Damal or Damalme are a group of people living in the highlands of the Central Papua province of Indonesia. They primarily live in Beoga Valley along the river of Beogong. The Damal people are closely related to the Delem people and the Amungme people living in the southern lowland region. Delem is an ethnic group reportedly descended from the Damal people, Dani people, and Wano people.

According to oral history, the Damal people came from a place called Mepingama in Baliem Valley, and then Kurima where they gathered, and Hitigima the place where they started creating Honai houses with thatched roofs. From Kurima, the ancestors of many Papuan tribes, including Damal, traveled west and settled in Ilop which are now called Beoga and Ilaga. From their heartland in Beoga and Ilaga, some Damal moved to Jila, Alama, Bella, Tsinga, Hoeya, Tembagapura (Kampung Waa), Aroanop, Timika, and Agimuga.

== Social structure ==
The Damal have a system of exogamous moieties, which splits the society into 'Magaij' and 'Mom'. These split social groups have equal standing politically and are only for marriage. People from the same social group cannot marry each other and have to marry people from the other social group. Each moiety is made up of patrilineal clans (same family name), with 37 clans in Beoga district and another 8 clans in Ilaga district. Each clan is made up of smaller patrilineal groups, which will help each other in supplying for travel, paying dowries, and other expenses.

Politically, Damal is led by Nagawan/Nagwan, which is not limited to certain groups or inherited positions. However, they have responsibilities to be good with finances, such as operating plantations, pig farms, and bia (shell) trade to pay for dowry and compensation for loss in tribal wars. They are expected to be alapme (charitable) and organise festivals for the people, as well as have good oratory skills and be brave to lead the war.
