= Uhunduni languages =

Trans–New Guinea language spoken in Indonesia

Uhunduni
- Damal
- Amung
- Region: Central Papua: central highlands, Paniai Regency, Beoga and Ilaga sub-districts; Asmat, Deiya, Mimika, and Puncak regencies, north and south Puncak Jaya; possibly Lanny Jaya and Nduga regencies.
- Ethnicity: Amung people, Damal people
- Native speakers: (14,000 cited 2000)
- Language family: Trans–New Guinea: West Papuan Highlands (Irian Highlands); Amung–Dem; Uhunduni

Language codes
- ISO 639-3: uhn
- Glottolog: dama1272
- ELP: Damal
- Map: The Amung language of New Guinea The Amung language Other Trans–New Guinea languages Other Papuan languages Austronesian languages Uninhabited

Uhunduni, also known as Damal (Damal-kal) and Amung (Amung-kal) after two of its dialects, is the language of the Amung people and Damal people. It is a Trans–New Guinea language that forms an independent branch of that family in the classification of Malcolm Ross (2005). However, it is treated as an isolate by Palmer (2018). This language family is also called Ingkipilu in a classification by Anton Moeliono. The word Damal came from the Dani people, while Uhunduni came from the Moni people.

Dialects are Amongme, Amung, Damal, Enggipilu.

== Classification ==
Pawley and Hammarström (2018) do not consider there to be sufficient evidence for Uhunduni to be classified as part of Trans-New Guinea, though they do note the following lexical resemblances between Uhunduni and proto-Trans-New Guinea.

- no- ‘eat’ < *na-
- mo- come’ < *me-
- mini- ‘sit’ < *mVna-
- eme- ‘give’ < *mV-

== Pronouns ==
Ross (2005) lists the pronouns as:

	singular	dual	plural
1	na	iru	enoŋ
2	a		erop
3	na		nuŋ

Iru is an inclusive dual.

== Vocabulary ==
The following basic vocabulary words of Damal (Uhunduni) are from the Trans-New Guinea database, citing Voorhoeve (1975).

gloss	Damal
head	niŋok
hair	niŋatok
eye	noŋop
tooth	naik
leg	dok; nok
louse	ma
dog	mitim
pig	bow
bird	elato; olem
egg	olemagam
blood	nimang
bone	dok; nok
skin	nigip
tree	em
man	me
sun	ul
water	o; uk; ut
fire	ka; kanelep
stone	kela
name	nem
eat	nowin
one	amenkak
two	au; u

== Literature ==
The New Testament in Damal was published in 1988.

- Damal people and CMA. 1988. Haik-A Ongam Kal: Perjanjian Baru Dalam Bahasa Damal [Haik-A Ongam Kal: The New Testament in Damal]. Jakarta: Lembaga Alkitab Indonesia.
