= Auye-Dao language =

Papuan language

Auye–Dao
- Native to: Indonesia
- Region: Central Papua
- Native speakers: (600 cited 1991–1995)
- Language family: Trans–New Guinea: West Trans–New Guinea; Paniai Lakes; Auye–Dao
- Dialects: Auye; Dao (Moi)

Language codes
- ISO 639-3: Either: auu – Auye daz – Moi-Wadea (Dao)
- Glottolog: auye1239
- ELP: Auye; Dao

Auye (Auwje) and Dao (Maniwo, Moi, Moi-Wadea) are the two dialects of a Papuan language spoken in the Paniai lakes region of the Indonesian province of Central Papua. The Moi dialect has been called 'Dao' after a neighboring river.
