= Mapia, Dogiyai =

Mapia
- Town
- Location in Western New Guinea and Indonesia Mapia (Indonesia)
- Coordinates: 3°59′23.67″S 135°54′17.66″E
- Country: Indonesia
- Province: Central Papua
- Regency: Dogiyai Regency

Population (2014)
  - Total: 5,983
- Time zone: UTC+9 (IEST)
- Area code: (+62) 971
- Villages: 7

Mapia is a district of Dogiyai Regency, Central Papua, Indonesia.

As of the 2014 Census, the district has a population of 5,983. It consists of the villages Abaimaida, Abaugi/Obaikagopa, Bomomani, Dawaikunu, Gabaikunu, Gapoya, and Magode.
