= Amung people =

Ethnic group from Central Papua, Indonesia

Amung people Amungme / Amuy / Amui / Hamung / Uhunduni
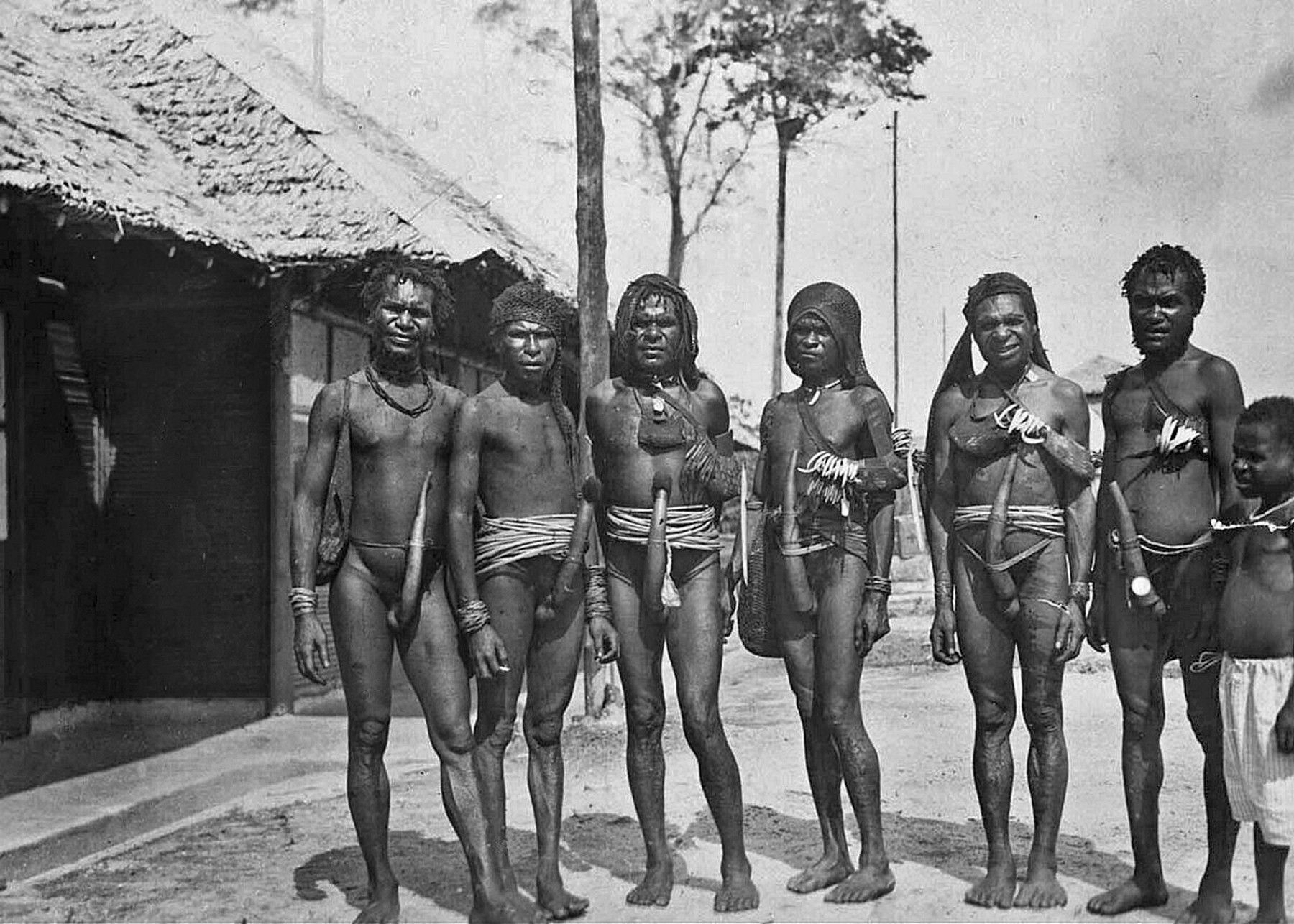
- Amung people, 1935

Total population
- 17,700

Regions with significant populations
- Indonesia (Central Papua)

Languages
- Amung-kal, Indonesian language

Religion
- Christianity (predominantly), Animism

Related ethnic groups
- Dem people, Damal people, Kamoro people

The Amung (also known as Amungme, Amungm, Amui, Amuy, Hamung, or Uhunduni) people are a group of about 17,700 people living in the highlands of the Central Papua province of Indonesia. Most Amungme live in Mimika and Puncak, in valleys like Noema, Tsinga, Hoeya, Bella, Alama, Aroanop, and Wa. A related group lives in Beoga Valley, Puncak and they are called Damal people.

Their language, Uhunduni, has several dialects. Amung-kal is spoken mostly in the southern regions by the Amungme, and in the north, it is called Damal-kal. Additionally, they have symbolic languages called Aro-a-kal and Tebo-a-kal. Tebo-a-kal is only spoken in sacred areas.

The traditional beliefs of the Amungme people are animistic. The Amungme people did not have the idea of "gods" that are separate from nature where spirits and nature are the same. They see themselves as the eldest child of God Nagawan Into, hence conqueror and ruler of the world Amungsa.

The position of Amungme leader is not inherited by lineage.

The Amungme people practice shifting agriculture, supplementing their livelihood by hunting and gathering. The Amungme are very tied to their ancestral land and consider the surrounding mountains to be sacred.

This has led to friction with the Indonesian government and the American mining company Freeport-McMoRan, which is eager to exploit the vast mineral deposits contained there. Major changes in the Amungme of the highlands and Kamoro of the lowlands lifestyle have been brought about by the Grasberg mine, situated in the heart of Amungme territory and owned by Freeport-McMoRan, the region's largest single employer.

Extensive gold and copper mining have altered the landscape, and the presence of the mine and its infrastructure has attracted numerous other economic migrants from regions in Indonesia including other Papuans, some of whom have tried to settle on traditional Amungme lands. This has caused a land dispute regarding customary land rights between the Amungme people against the Freeport mining company in Timika. In the last 35 years, the Amungme have seen their sacred mountain destroyed by the Freeport mine and watched as their relatives are killed and caught in the conflict between Indonesian soldiers and Free Papua Movement rebels, while the Kamoro have more than 200,000 tons of mining waste pumped into their rivers each day. All these factors have created complex social and political stresses and led to somewhat frequent protests and/or social conflicts, some of which have been violently suppressed by the Indonesian police or military.

== Notable people ==
- Yosepha Alomang, human rights defender and environmental activist

== See also ==
- Indigenous people of New Guinea
