= Asmat Swamp =

Coordinates: 4.7500°S 137.8333°E

Asmat Swamp is a wetland on the southern coast of New Guinea, located within the Indonesian province of South Papua. It is sometimes claimed to be the largest alluvial swamp in the world, being said to have an area of around 30,000 km^{2}. It is crossed by numerous rivers and streams, and large areas are underwater at high tide.

Ecologically, the swamp is diverse. The muddy coastal areas are dominated by mangroves and nipah palms. Inland, where the swamp is freshwater, other sorts of vegetation become more common — herbaceous vegetation, grasses, and forest. A significant portion of the swamp is peatland. It is home to a wide variety of animals, including freshwater fish, crabs, lobsters, shrimp, crocodiles, sea snakes, and pigeons. Also inhabiting the swamp are large monitor lizards, of which Varanus salvadorii is longer (although not as heavy) as the more famous Komodo dragon.

The swamp takes its name from the Asmat people, who inhabit it. The difficult terrain of the swamp meant that the Asmat did not have regular contact with outsiders until the 1950s, and the swamp still remains isolated. The swamp forms part of Indonesia's Lorentz National Park.
