= Sempan people =

Indigenous people in Central Papua, Indonesia

Sempan are indigenous people in Central Papua, Western New Guinea, Indonesia, mainly in the coastal-riverine zone of the Mimika Regency. They speak the Sempan language.

Karen Jacobs in her book Collecting Kamoro writes that they are conflated with the Kamoro people, since they live in the area between rivers Minajerwi ad Otakwa. within the area where Kamoro live. Western Sempan live in villages of Otakwa (a.k.a. Ohotya), Fanamo (a.k.a. Inafita), and Omawita (a.k.a. Omauga). Eastern Sempan live in the villaes of Fakafuku, Pece, Owapu, ad Sumapero. Their area is within the Lorentz National Park.
