= Kamoro language =

Asmat–Kamoro language spoken in New Guinea

Kamoro
- Native to: Indonesia
- Region: Mimika Regency, Central Papua
- Native speakers: (8,000 cited 1987)
- Language family: Trans–New Guinea: Asmat–Kamoro; Kamoro

Language codes
- ISO 639-3: kgq
- Glottolog: kamo1255

The Kamoro language is an Asmat–Kamoro language spoken in Western New Guinea, specifically in Mimika Regency, Central Papua by Kamoro people, approximately 8,000 persons. Dialect diversity is notable, and Kamoro should perhaps not be considered a single language.

== Varieties ==
'Dialects' are as follows.

- Yamur (far west around Yamur Lake and Etna Bay)
- Western (Japakòparè, Kéàkwa and Umari Rivers, 450 speakers in 1953)
- Tarjà (Opa River, 500 speakers in 1953)
- Middle (Wàkia river to the upper Mimika River, 4,300 speakers in 1953)
- Kàmora (Kàmora River, 400 speakers in 1953)
- Wània (Wània River 1,300 speakers in 1953)
- Mukumùga (Mukumùga river, 800 speakers in 1953)

== Bibliography ==
- Moseley, Christopher and R. E. Asher, ed. Atlas of the World's Languages (New York: Routledge, 1994) p. 110
