= Ekari language =

Trans–New Guinea language of Indonesia

Ekari
- Mee
- Native to: Indonesia
- Region: Papua
- Ethnicity: Ekari
- Native speakers: (100,000 cited 1985)
- Language family: Trans–New Guinea: West Papuan Highlands; Paniai Lakes; Ekari

Language codes
- ISO 639-3: ekg
- Glottolog: ekar1243

A view of Moanemani, Papua

Ekari (also Ekagi, Kapauku, Mee) is a Trans–New Guinea language spoken by about 100,000 people in the Paniai lakes region of the Indonesian province of Central Papua, including the villages of Enarotali, Mapia and Moanemani. This makes it the second-most populous Papuan language in Indonesian New Guinea after Western Dani. Language use is vigorous. Documentation is quite limited.

== Phonology ==
=== Consonants ===
		Bilabial	Alveolar	Palatal	Velar
Nasal		m	n		
Obstruent	plain	p	t		k
Obstruent	voiced	b	d		ɡʟ̝
Approximant		w		j	

The voiced velar affricate /ɡʟ̝/ is pronounced with lateral release before front vowels. Doble describes both /k/ and /ɡʟ̝/ as being labialized [kʷ, ɡʟ̝ʷ] after the back vowels /o, u/ (i.e., okei 'they', euga 'more'), with /ɡʟ̝/ having 'varying' degrees of the lateral. Staroverov & Tebay describe /ɡʟ̝/ as being velar lateral [ɡʟ̝] before front vowels and uvular non-lateral [ɢʁ] before non-front vowels.

/j/ is a "more palatalized [ʒ]" (perhaps [ʝ] or [ʑ]) before the high front vowel /i/ (e.g., yina 'insect').

=== Vowels ===
Staroverov & Tebay (2019) describe five vowel qualities plus length and diphthongs. Doble (1987) analyses the long vowels and diphthongs as sequences.

Monophthongs
	front	central	back
high	i iː		u uː
mid	ɛ ɛː		o oː
low		a aː	

Diphthongs
	front	central	back
mid	ɛi ɛu		ou
low		ai au	

=== Tone ===
Ekari has pitch accent. One syllable in a word may have a high tone, contrasting with words without a high tone. If the vowel is long or a diphthong and not at the end of the word, the high tone is phonetically rising.

CV words have no tone contrast. CVV words may be mid/low or high. (In all of these patterns, here and following, initial C is optional.)

Words of the following shapes may have a contrastive high tone on the final syllable: CVCV, CVCVV. Words of the following shapes may have either a rising or a falling tone on the first long syllable: CVVCV, CVVCVV, CVCVVCVV, CVVCVCV (rare), CVVCVCVV (rare). The following word shapes do not have contrastive tone: CVCVCV, CVCVVCV, CVCVCVV, and words of 4 or more syllables.

== Bibliography ==
- Doble, Marion (1962). Essays on Kapauku grammar. Nieuw Guinea Studiën. Vol. 6. pp. 152–155, 211–218, 279–298.
- Doble, Marion (1987). "A description of some features of Ekari language structure". Oceanic Linguistics. 26 (1/2): 55–113. doi:10.2307/3623166. JSTOR 3623166.
- Drabbe, Peter (1952). Spraakkunst van het Ekagi, Wisselmeren, Nederlands Nieuw Guinea (in Dutch). Den Haag: Martinus Nijhoff.
- Steltenpool, J (1969). Ekagi-Dutch-English-Indonesian Dictionary. VKI 56. The Hague: Martinus Nijhoff.
- Staroverov, Peter; Tebay, Sören E. (2019). "Posterior Affricate in Mee and Consonant-Vowel Place Interactions". Proceedings of the Annual Meetings on Phonology. 7. doi:10.3765/amp.v7i0.4481.
