= Moni people =

Moni people Migani / Megani / Djonggunu / Jonggunu
Total population
- 28,200

Regions with significant populations
- Indonesia (Central Papua)

Languages
- Moni language, Indonesian language

Religion
- Christianity (predominantly), Animism

Related ethnic groups
- Papuan: Mee, Napan (Auye), Wolani

The Moni (also known as the Migani, the Megani, the Djonggunu, or the Jonggunu) are an indigenous people in Intan Jaya Regency, Central Papua, Indonesia, in Western New Guinea. They speak the Moni language.

The Moni revere the bondegezou, a large black and white whistling tree kangaroo, as an ancestor. The bondegezou was unknown to the scientific community until the zoologist Tim Flannery described it in 1995.

== See also ==
- Indigenous people of New Guinea
