= Moni language =

Papuan language

Moni
- Native to: Indonesia
- Region: Central Papua
- Ethnicity: Moni
- Native speakers: (20,000 cited 1991)
- Language family: Trans–New Guinea: West Trans–New Guinea; Paniai Lakes; Moni

Language codes
- ISO 639-3: mnz
- Glottolog: moni1261

Moni, as given by Ekari people, or Migani/Megani, as given by locals, also known as Djonggunu, Jonggunu, is a Papuan language spoken by about 20,000 people (1991) in the Paniai lakes region of the Indonesian province of Central Papua. Majority of Moni language speakers live in Kemandoga valley. Awembak (Awembiak) is a dialect.

== Bibliography ==
- Larson, Gordon Frederick; Larson, Mildred O. (1958). "Preliminary Studies in the Moni Language". Bijdragen tot de Taal-, Land- en Volkenkunde. KITLV: 406–31.
