= Dogiyai Regency =

Regency in Central Papua, Indonesia

Dogiyai Regency Kabupaten Dogiyai
- Regency
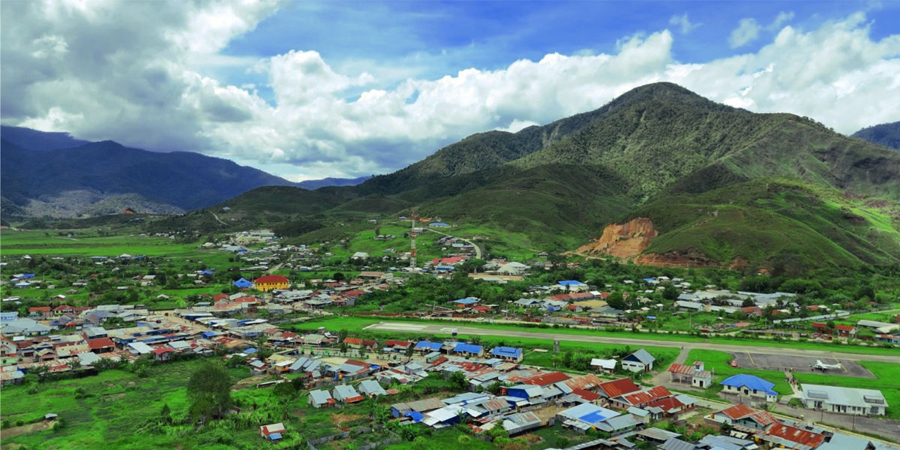
- Capital of Dogiyai in Kamuu valley

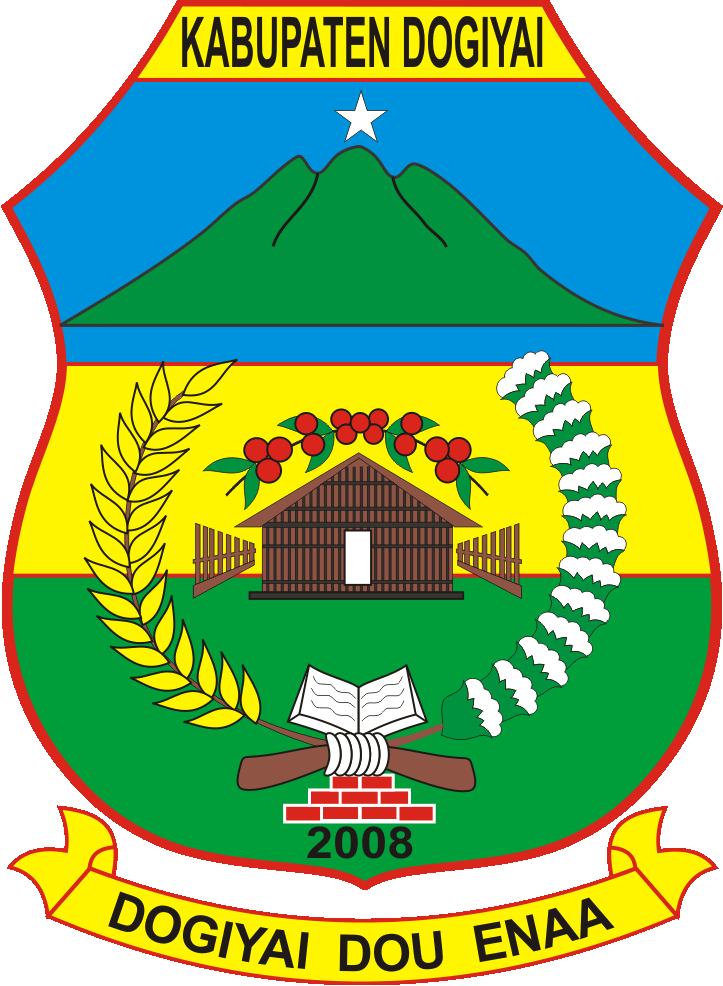
- Coat of arms
- Motto: Dogiyai Dou Enaa
- Location in Central Papua

- Location in Indonesian Papua Location in Indonesia
- Coordinates: 4.057°S 135.709°E
- Country: Indonesia
- Province: Central Papua
- Capital: Kigamani

Government
  - Regent: Yudas Tebai
  - Vice Regent: Yuliten Anouw

Area
  - Total: 7,052.92 km^{2} (2,723.15 sq mi)
- Highest elevation: 3,891 m (12,766 ft)

Population (mid 2024 estimate)
  - Total: 125,178
  - Density: 17.7484/km^{2} (45.9681/sq mi)
- Time zone: UTC+9 (Indonesia Eastern Time)
- Area code: (+62) 971
- Website: dogiyaikab.go.id

Dogiyai Regency is one of the regencies (kabupaten) in the Indonesian province of Central Papua. The Regency was created on 4 January 2008 from what had previously been the southern districts of Nabire Regency. It covers an area of 7,052.92 km^{2} (revised from 4,237.4 km^{2}), and had a population of 84,230 at the 2010 Census and 116,206 at the 2020 Census; the official estimate as of mid-2024 was 125,178, comprising 64,996 males and 60,182 females. The regency seat is the town of Kigamani (in Dogiyai District).

== History ==
During the 2020s, Dogiyai was involved in a border dispute with neighboring Mimika and Deiyai regencies, resulting in the Kapiraya conflict.

== Administrative districts and villages ==
When it was formed in January 2008, the new Dogiyai Regency comprised three districts (distrik) from within the southern part of the existing Nabire Regency, but these were subsequently reconstructed into the present ten districts. The former Sukikai District was divided between new Sukikai Selatan (in the south) and Piyaiye (in the north) Districts. The Mapia District was also divided, with the southern half split between new Mapia Barat and Mapia Tengah Districts, leaving a residual Mapia District in the north. The Dogiyai (in the west), Kamu Selatan, Kamu Timur and Kamu Utara Districts were formed from most parts of the Kamu District.

The following is a table of the current districts (kecamatan) - and of the 79 villages (all rated as rural kampung) by district - within the Dogiyai Regency, based on Statistics Indonesia, with the district areas and their populations at the Censuses of 2010 and 2020, together with the official estimates as of mid-2021. The table also includes the numbers of administrative villages within each district, and its post code. The villages named in bold below are the locations of the district administrative centres.

Region Code	Name of District (distrik)	Area in km^{2}	Pop'n Census 2010	Pop'n Census 2020	Pop'n Estimate mid 2021	No. of villages	Villages (kampung)	Post code
94.06.05	Sukikai Selatan (South Sukikai)	887.00	3,720	4,362	4,402	4	Iyaro, Sukikai, **Unito**, Wigoumakida.	98875
94.06.03	Piyaiye	1,349.00	10,575	8,511	8,564	8	**Apogomakida**, Deneiode, Egipa, Ideduwa, Kegata, Tibaugi, Ukagu, Yegiyepa.	98874
94.06.06	Mapia Barat (West Mapia)	760.00	4,557	3,553	3,575	4	**Abouyaga**, Maikotu, Taubaikebo, Yegoukotu.	98872
94.06.09	Mapia Tengah (Central Mapia)	2,014.50	10,124	11,012	11,081	10	Adauwo, Atou (Tuamani), Diyeugi, Gabaikuna, Megaikebo, **Modio**, Piyakumu, Putaapa, Timepa, Upibega (Ukudawata).	98873
94.06.02	Mapia	1,531.75	5,983	9,838	10,037	7	Abaimaida, **Bobomani**, Bonakunu, Dawaikunu, Diyoudimi, Magode, Obaikagopa (Abaugi).	98871
94.06.10	Dogiyai (district)	115.92	11,326	14,385	14,452	9	Bobobutu, Denemani, **Dogimani** (Abgoigi), Egebutu, Idadagi, Kigamani, Makidimi, Motito, Pona.	98881
94.06.07	Kamu Selatan (South Kamu)	144.48	12,347	21,450	21,898	12	Bogoya Teugi, Botumoma, Digikebo, Matadi, Obaibega, Pouwouda, **Puweta I**, Puweta II, Tuwaida, Ugikagouda, Ugikebo, Yepo (Makidimi).	98883
94.06.01	Kamu	77.60	11,400	16,491	16,778	8	Bukapa, Dikiyouywo, Ekemanida, Idakotu, **Ikebo** (Moanemani), Kimupugi, Mauwa, Putapa.	98882
94.06.08	Kamu Timur (East Kamu)	80.00	5,978	10,561	10,652	7	Boduda, Bokaibutu, Bunauwo, Deiyapa, Nuwa, **Ugapuga**, Yotapuga.	98884
94.06.04	Kamu Utara (North Kamu)	92.67	8,220	16,043	16,379	10	Duntek, Ekimani, **Idakebo**, Ikrar, Kuyakago, Mogou, Obayo, Pugatadi I, Pugatadi II, Yametadi.	98885
