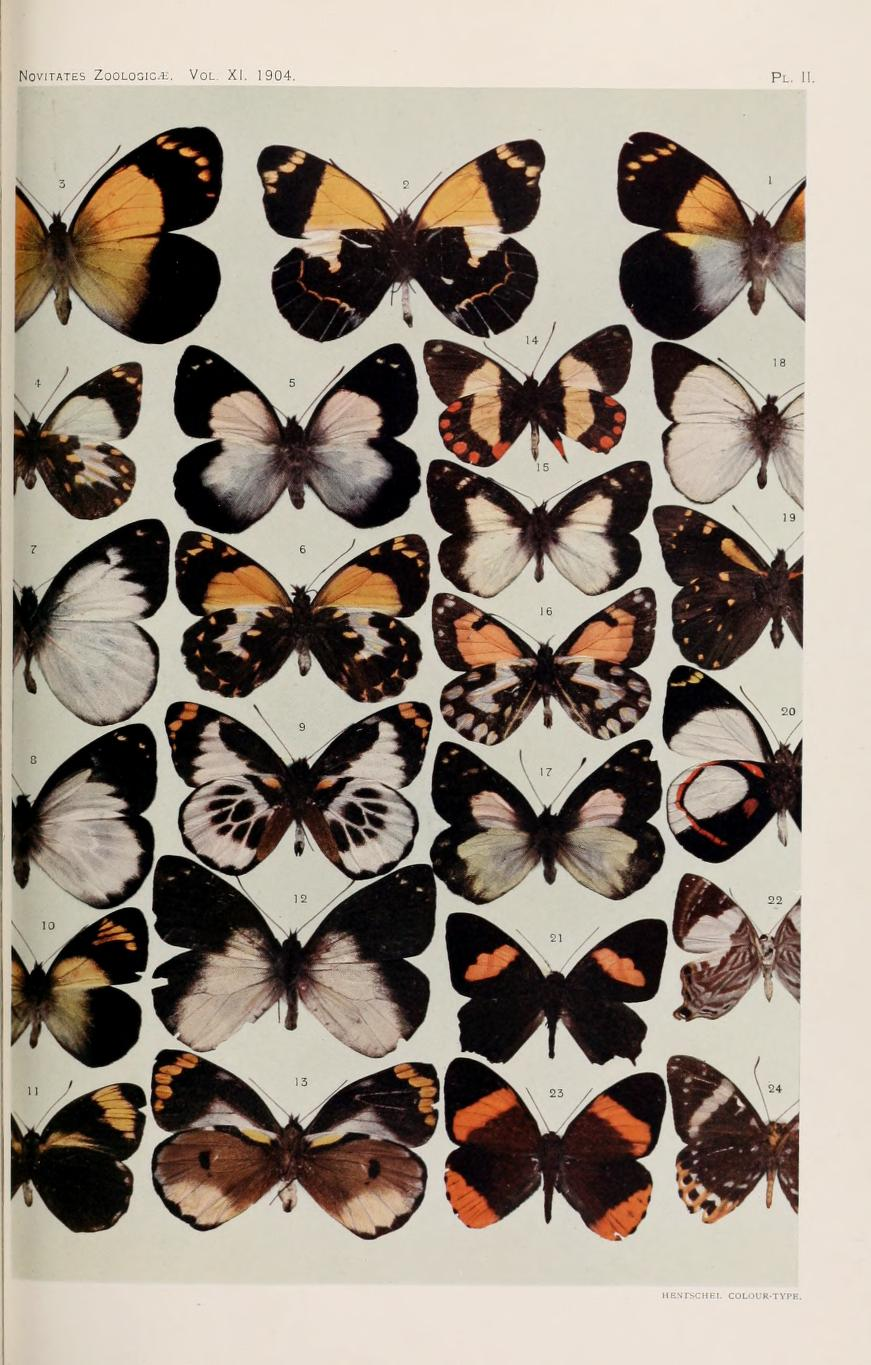
- Delias eichhorni in Novitates Zoologicae (15,16,17)

Scientific classification
- Kingdom: Animalia
- Phylum: Arthropoda
- Clade: Pancrustacea
- Class: Insecta
- Order: Lepidoptera
- Family: Pieridae
- Genus: Delias
- Species: D. eichhorni

Binomial name
- Delias eichhorni Rothschild, 1904

= Delias eichhorni =

Species of butterfly

Delias eichhorni is a butterfly in the family Pieridae. It was described by Walter Rothschild in 1904. It is found in New Guinea.

== Description ==
Original Delias eichorni spec.nov. Male Wings, uppersiJe. Forewing black, a large white triangular area from hinder margin forwards to R3, penetrating into the cell, truncate-sinuate costally, not extending to base; three white spots beyond apex of cell from costal margin to R3, more or less confluent, the first the smallest : two small white subapical spots. Hindwing for the greater part white; a somewhat irregular distal marginal band- black, tapering behind. Underside. Forewing black, a large deep cadmium-yellow area, deeply excised at the cross-veins; a row of five white submarginal spots, slightly tinged with citron-yellow, second the largest, fourth the smallest. Hindwing olive-black; a white band somewhat shaped like figure 3 obliquely from base of costal margin to disc, streaked or spotted with yellow between the veins, a submarginal row of large white spots, mostly nailhead-shaped, being produced to the distal edge, except the first; these also marked with yellow mesially; a yellow spot between end of band and SM2; this vein citron-yellow; abdominal margin more or less white in middle.

Female. Differs from male on the upperside in the forewing being more extended black and having the spots sulphur-yellow, in the hindwing being shaded with sulphur-yellow, and having a broader black border, which includes vestigial sulphureous spots; and on the underside in the forewing bearing a series of seven submarginal spots. Hab. Owgarra, north of head of Aroa River, May 1903. A small series. The wingspan is about 56 mm.

== Subspecies ==
- D. e. eichhorni (Aroa River, Owen Stanley Range, Papua New Guinea)
- D. e. kerowagi Morinaka, Mastrigt & Sibatani, 1993 (Kerowagi, Papua New Guinea)
- D. e. hagenensis Morinaka, Mastrigt & Sibatani, 1993 (Southern Highland Province, Pap Creek, Papua New Guinea)

== Taxonomy ==
It is the nominotypical member of the eichhorni group.
