= Deiyai Regency =

Regency in Central Papua, Indonesia

Deiyai Regency Kabupaten Deiyai
- Regency
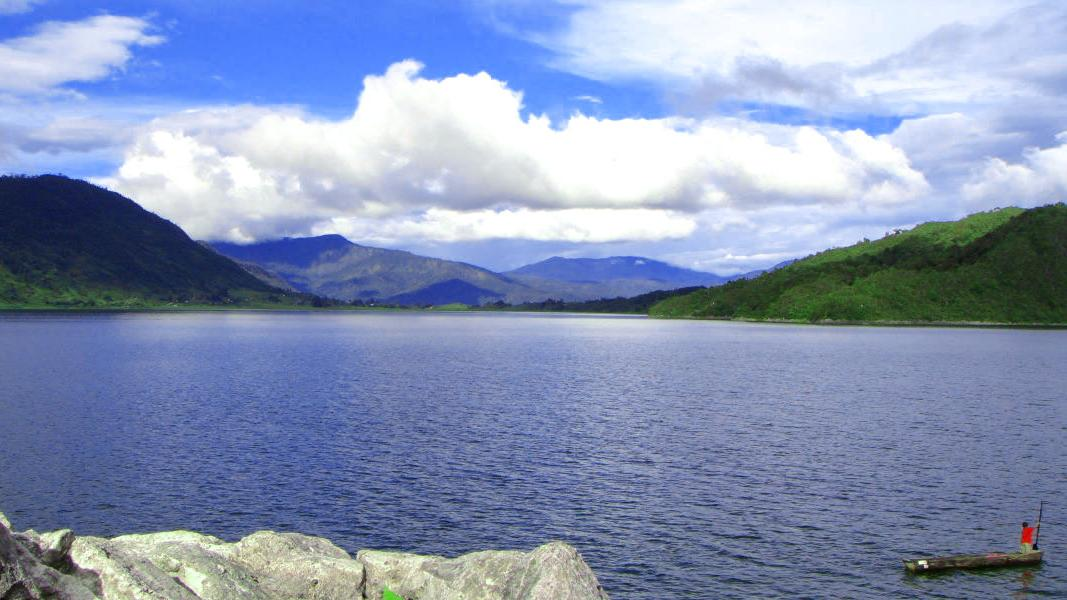
- Lake Tigi in Deiyai

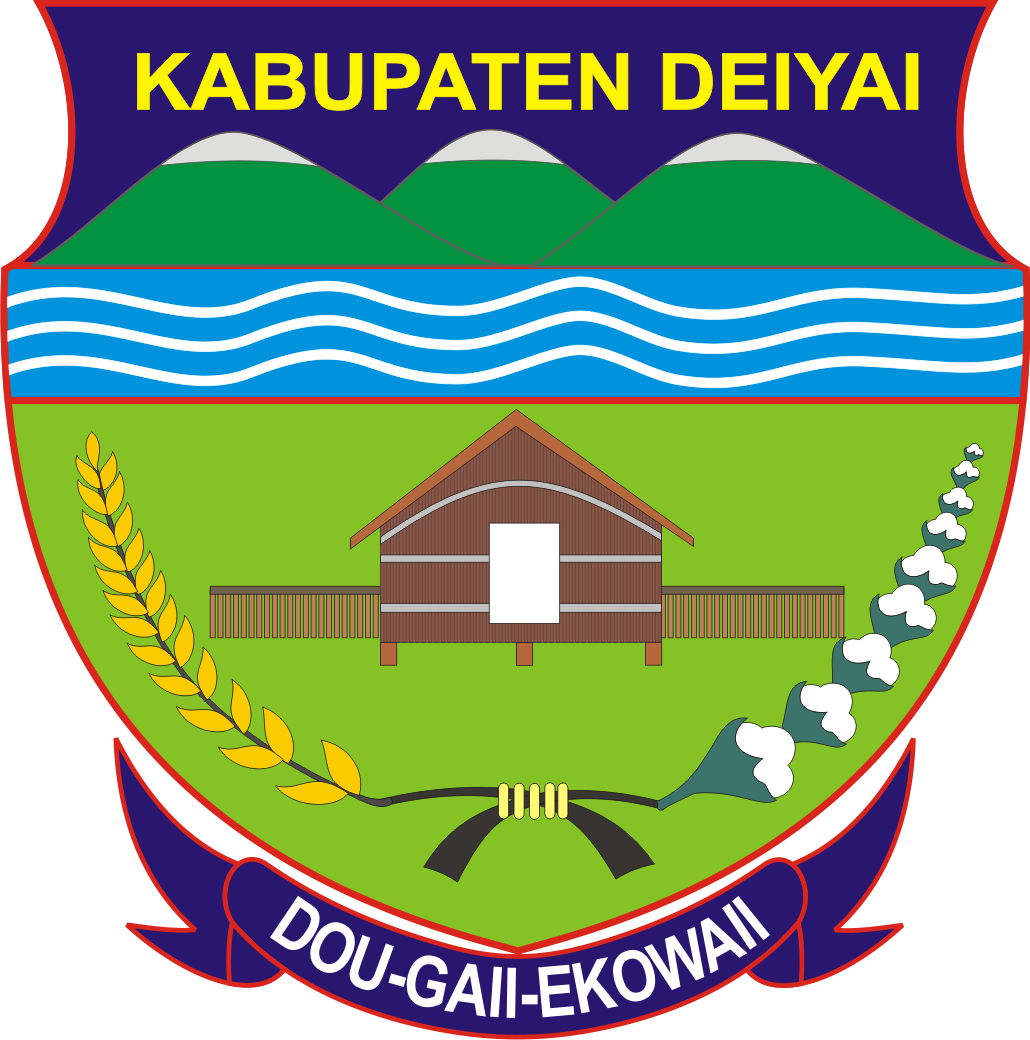
- Coat of arms
- Motto: Dou Gaii Ekowaii
- Location in Central Papua

- Location in Indonesian Papua Location in Indonesia
- Coordinates: 4.174°S 136.437°E
- Country: Indonesia
- Province: Central Papua
- Capital: Tigi

Government
  - Regent: Melkianus Mote
  - Vice Regent: Ayub Pigome

Area
  - Total: 1,012.67 km^{2} (390.99 sq mi)

Population (mid 2025 estimate)
  - Total: 93,168
  - Density: 92.002/km^{2} (238.28/sq mi)
- Time zone: UTC+9 (Indonesia Eastern Time)
- Area code: (+62) 971
- Website: deiyaikab.go.id

Deiyai Regency is one of the regencies (kabupaten) in the Indonesian province of Central Papua; it was formed on 29 October 2008 from the southeastern corner of the Paniai Regency area, and inaugurated by the Indonesian Minister of Home Affairs, Mardiyanto. The legal basis for the formation of this regency was the Law of the Republic of Indonesia of 2008 Number 55.

The regency covers an area of 1,012.67 km^{2}, and had a population of 62,998 at the 2010 Census; the 2020 Census revealed a total of 99,091; the official estimate as of mid-2025 was 93,168 (comprising 49,146 males and 33,022 females). The administrative centre is at the town of Waghete.

== History ==
During the 2020s, Deiyai was involved in a border dispute with neighboring Mimika and Dogiyai regencies, resulting in the Kapiraya conflict.

== Geography ==
The northern part of the regency's territory (comprising Tigi Barat, Tigi and Tigi Timur Districts) surrounds Lake Tigi. This lake is located 1,780 metres above sea level and has a depth of up to 150 metres. This lake has a very cold mountainous climate. Lake Tigi has extraordinary natural attractions, a cool and refreshing atmosphere, clear water, and a dazzling view at the foot of Mount Deiyai. The remaining districts (Kapiraya in the southwest and Bowobado in the south) are much less populated.

The regent is now based in the town of Waghete, which is part of the Tigi District. The new Regent's office was completed in 2010, built on a land area of 500 x 300 square metres, which was purchased from the local community. The town of Waghete is located on the edge of an ancient lake, namely Lake Tigi. The Tigi region is a valley unit, with a relatively flat plain especially around Lake Tigi.

== Administrative districts ==
Deiyai Regency comprises five districts (distrik), tabulated below with their populations at the 2010 Census and the 2020 Census, together with the official estimates as of mid-2025. The table also includes the locations of the district administrative centres, the number of administrative villages (all rated as rural kampung) in each district, and its post code.

Kode Wilayah	Name of District (distrik)	Area in km^{2}	Pop'n 2010 Census	Pop'n 2020 Census	Pop'n mid 2025 Estimate	Admin centre	No. of villages	Post code
94.08.01	Tigi	30.86	14,620	33,606	31,975	Waghete	20	98764
94.08.02	Tigi Timur (East Tigi)	134.58	10,592	18,955	17,783	Damabagata	14	98771
94.08.03	Bowobado	501.35	7,596	8,891	7,454	Kopai I	6	98751
94.08.04	Tigi Barat (West Tigi)	187.02	26,476	31,370	30,318	Ayate	22	98761
94.08.05	Kapiraya	158.86	3,714	6,269	5,638	Komaute	5	97852
	Totals	1,012.67	62,998	99,091	93,168	Waghete	67	

== Climate ==
Waghete has a subtropical highland climate (Cfb) with heavy to very heavy rainfall year-round.

Climate data for Waghete
Month	Jan	Feb	Mar	Apr	May	Jun	Jul	Aug	Sep	Oct	Nov	Dec	Year
Mean daily maximum °C (°F)	23.9 (75.0)	23.8 (74.8)	23.4 (74.1)	23.0 (73.4)	22.2 (72.0)	21.0 (69.8)	20.1 (68.2)	20.2 (68.4)	21.2 (70.2)	22.7 (72.9)	23.5 (74.3)	23.8 (74.8)	22.4 (72.3)
Daily mean °C (°F)	18.7 (65.7)	18.6 (65.5)	18.5 (65.3)	18.3 (64.9)	17.9 (64.2)	17.1 (62.8)	16.5 (61.7)	16.5 (61.7)	16.9 (62.4)	17.9 (64.2)	18.3 (64.9)	18.7 (65.7)	17.8 (64.1)
Mean daily minimum °C (°F)	13.5 (56.3)	13.5 (56.3)	13.7 (56.7)	13.7 (56.7)	13.7 (56.7)	13.3 (55.9)	12.9 (55.2)	12.8 (55.0)	12.7 (54.9)	13.1 (55.6)	13.2 (55.8)	13.6 (56.5)	13.3 (56.0)
Average rainfall mm (inches)	237 (9.3)	313 (12.3)	242 (9.5)	265 (10.4)	292 (11.5)	334 (13.1)	340 (13.4)	330 (13.0)	308 (12.1)	253 (10.0)	231 (9.1)	207 (8.1)	3,352 (131.8)
Source: Climate-Data.org
