= Mee (ethnic group) =

Ethnic group from Papua, Indonesia

Ekari
Bunani Mee
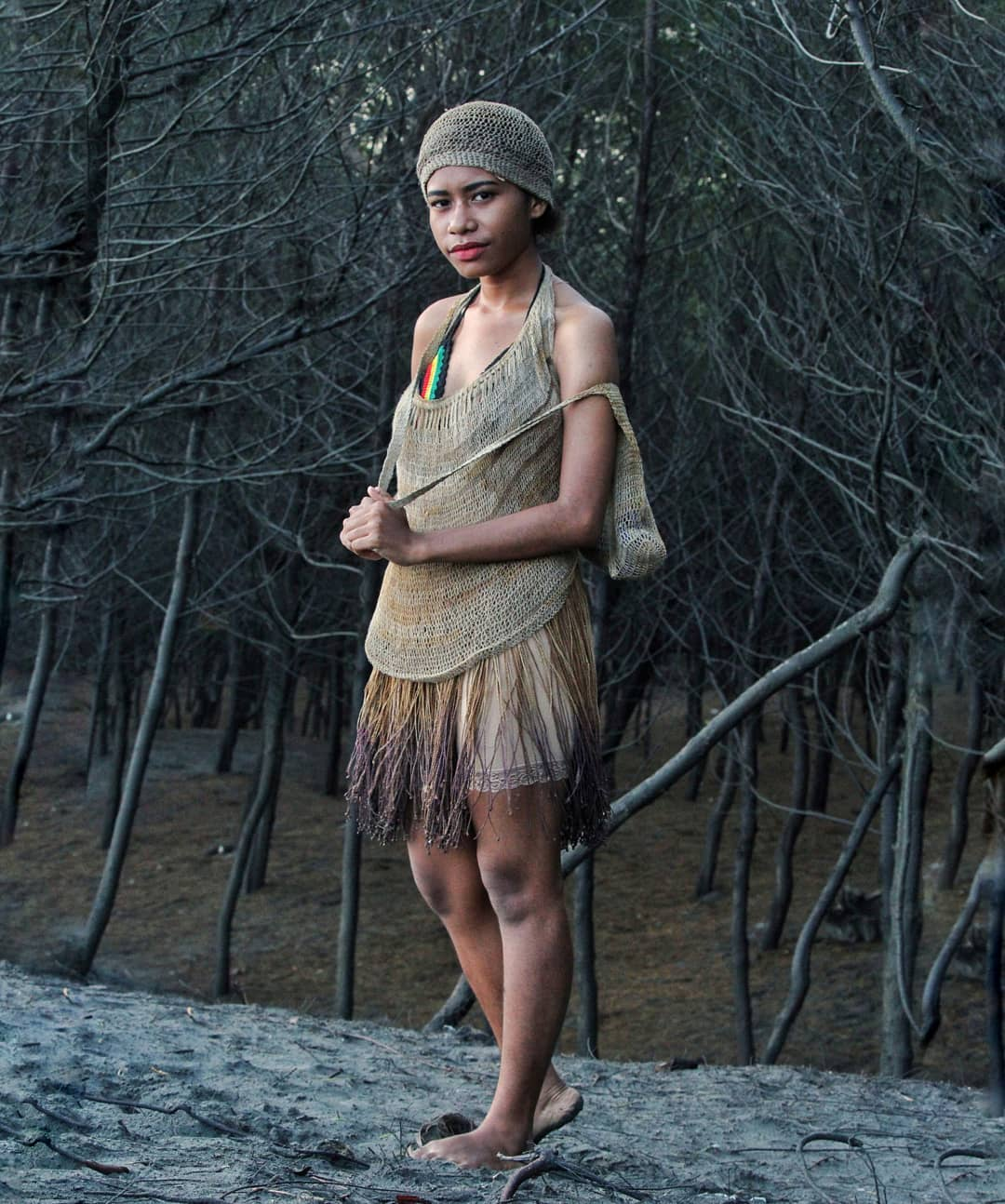
- Mee women wearing moge traditional bark clothing

Total population
- 316,357 (2010)

Regions with significant populations
- Indonesia (Central Papua)

Languages
- Ekagi language, Indonesian language

Religion
- Christianity (95%), Islam (2%), other ethnic religions (3%)

The Mee (also Bunani Mee, Ekari, Ekagi, Kapauku, Tapiro) are a people in the Paniai Lakes area of Central Papua, Indonesia. They speak the Ekagi language.

== History ==
According to the oral history of the Mee, their ancestor came from a place east of the Baliem Valley, called Pupupapa or Pagimo Peku ("large cave"). The Mee have formed trading relationships with their surrounding tribes, like the Moni and Kamoro, using traditional money called mege (cowrie shells). European explorers made their first contact during the 1909–1911 expedition by British Ornithologists' Union. Through the southern route from the Kamoro's region, they explored Mount Tapiro in Deiyai and found a group of inland people, because of their shorter-than-average height, they were called Tapiro pygmies. Later in 1934, the Dutch pilot Frits Wissel came across three large lakes, the Paniai, Tigi, and Tage, where there were numerous human settlements and activities. The Mee then were called the Ekari (exonym from the Moni) or Kapauku (exonym from the Kamoro), though they preferred to be called by the name Mee, shortened from Makado Mee ("true human").

== Epidemiological significance ==
In the 1970s, an investigation was conducted by Indonesian physicians concerned about the high rates of Ekari people hospitalized for burns. The study revealed many Ekari people were suffering from neurocysticercosis, caused by the pork tapeworm, Taenia solium, which had been previously unseen in Papua New Guinea. As a result, many had been suffering seizures while near fires, injuring themselves in the process. Pigs infected with the tapeworms had been introduced to the island previously by the Indonesian unknowingly. Though based on modern genetic study, tapeworms in Papua are the oldest among Indonesian haplotypes. They diverged from lineages in Bali at minimum 25,000 years BP, hence unlikely to be recent introduction.

== Representations in media ==
- National Geographic aired the film Tribal Odyssey: The Chief Who Talks to God: The Mee, Papua in 2005 as part of its Tribal Odyssey series.

== See also ==
- Indigenous people of New Guinea
