= Paniai Lakes =

System of three lakes in New Guinea, Indonesia

Lake Paniai
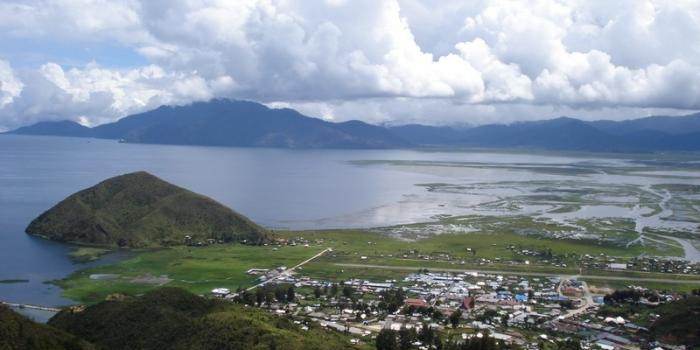
- Lake Paniai, with the town of Enarotali at lower right

- Location in Central Papua Location in Indonesian Papua
- Location: Paniai Regency and Deiyai Regency, Central Papua, Indonesia
- Coordinates: 3°54′S 136°19′E
- Primary outflows: Yawei River (Urumuka)
- Basin countries: Indonesia
- Max. length: 16 km (9.9 mi)
- Max. width: 9 km (5.6 mi)
- Surface area: 154 km^{2} (59 sq mi)
- Max. depth: 44 m (144 ft)
- Surface elevation: 1,740 m (5,710 ft)

The Paniai Lakes, originally known as the Wissel Lakes, are the three large, freshwater lakes in Central Papua, Indonesia: Paniai, Tigi, and Tage. Lakes Paniai and Tage are located in the Paniai Regency, while Lake Tigi is located in the Deiyai Regency. The largest of the three is Lake Paniai (Danau Paniai), while its immediate neighbor Lake Tage is the smallest.

== Geography ==
The lakes are in the New Guinea Highlands, between the Weyland Mountains on the west and the Sudirman Range or Snow mountains to the east.

Lake Paniai is the largest of the lakes, with an area of approximately 154 km^{2}. The lake's elevation is 1,752 metres, and it has an average depth of 44 metres. There are wetlands along the eastern shore of the lake, including around the town of Enarotali. The lake is drained by the Jawej River, which flows southwards to join the Oeta River, which empties into the Arafura Sea.

Lake Tage is immediately south of Lake Paniai separated by a narrow strip of land, and is approximately 8 km long east to west and 3 km wide north to south. It has an elevation of 1758 metres and a maximum depth of 52 metres. Lake Tage empties into Lake Paniai via the short Dimija River, which is partly subterranean.

Tigi Lake is south of Lake Tage, and has a surface elevation of 1640 metres. It is roughly triangular in shape with a maximum distance across of 8 km. It drains into the Jawej River via underground streams.

== Discovery ==
Despite their considerable size (Lake Paniai alone is larger than Lake Como), they were not known outside New Guinea until 1937. On 31 December 1936, the Dutch navy pilot Frits Julius Wissel, just weeks after first ascending the highest mountain of New Guinea, and his crew flew over the lakes while making an aerial survey for the Dutch New Guinea oil company. He took photos and noticed many people in canoes, establishing that this mountainous region was populated. During a follow-up flight by E.L.J. Haak on 15 February 1937, it was established that there were many settlements around the lakes, indicating a thriving agricultural society. In November of that year, the Dutch Indies government named the group of lakes after Wissel. A small Dutch outpost was established here in 1938, but contact was cut off during the Second World War.

== Recent history ==
The region of the Paniai Lakes, consisting of a depression between the Weyland and Sudirman ranges, is heavily populated. The indigenous peoples of this area are the Ekagi, also called the Mee. Around the year 2001, as part of the Papua conflict, the surrounding forests were burned down by the military so that they could not harbor separatists. Illegal or informal mining operations in Baya Biru also exacerbated the pollution and environmental degradation. However, it was difficult for local authorities to stop because of its remote location, which is only accessible by helicopter, and mining activities employ 7,000 people in the area. Combined, these resulted in increased sedimentation of Lake Paniai, and in 2011, the lake overflowed, flooding the surrounding area with up to 4 meters of water.

== Ecology ==
There are few fish in the lakes, but the Paniai gudgeon (Oxyeleotris wisselensis) is endemic to the lake system. The common carp (Cyprinus carpio), Nile tilapia (Oreochromis niloticus) and Mozambique tilapia (O. mossambicus) are non-natives that have been introduced by humans.

In contrast to the low fish diversity, there is a very high diversity of Parastacid crayfish of the genus Cherax. Of the eight species known from the lake system, two (C. longipes and C. solus) are endemic Lake Tigi, five (C. boschmai, C. buitendijkae, C. murido, C. pallidus and C. paniaicus) are endemic to Lake Paniai, and a single species (C. communis) is found both in the lakes and the surrounding area.

A species of skink (Emoia paniai), is endemic to and named after the area.

== See also ==
- List of drainage basins in Indonesia
- Paniai Lakes languages
