= Central Papua =

Province in Western New Guinea, Indonesia

Central Papua Papua Tengah Mee Pago – Saireri
- Province with special status
- Province of Central Papua; Provinsi Papua Tengah
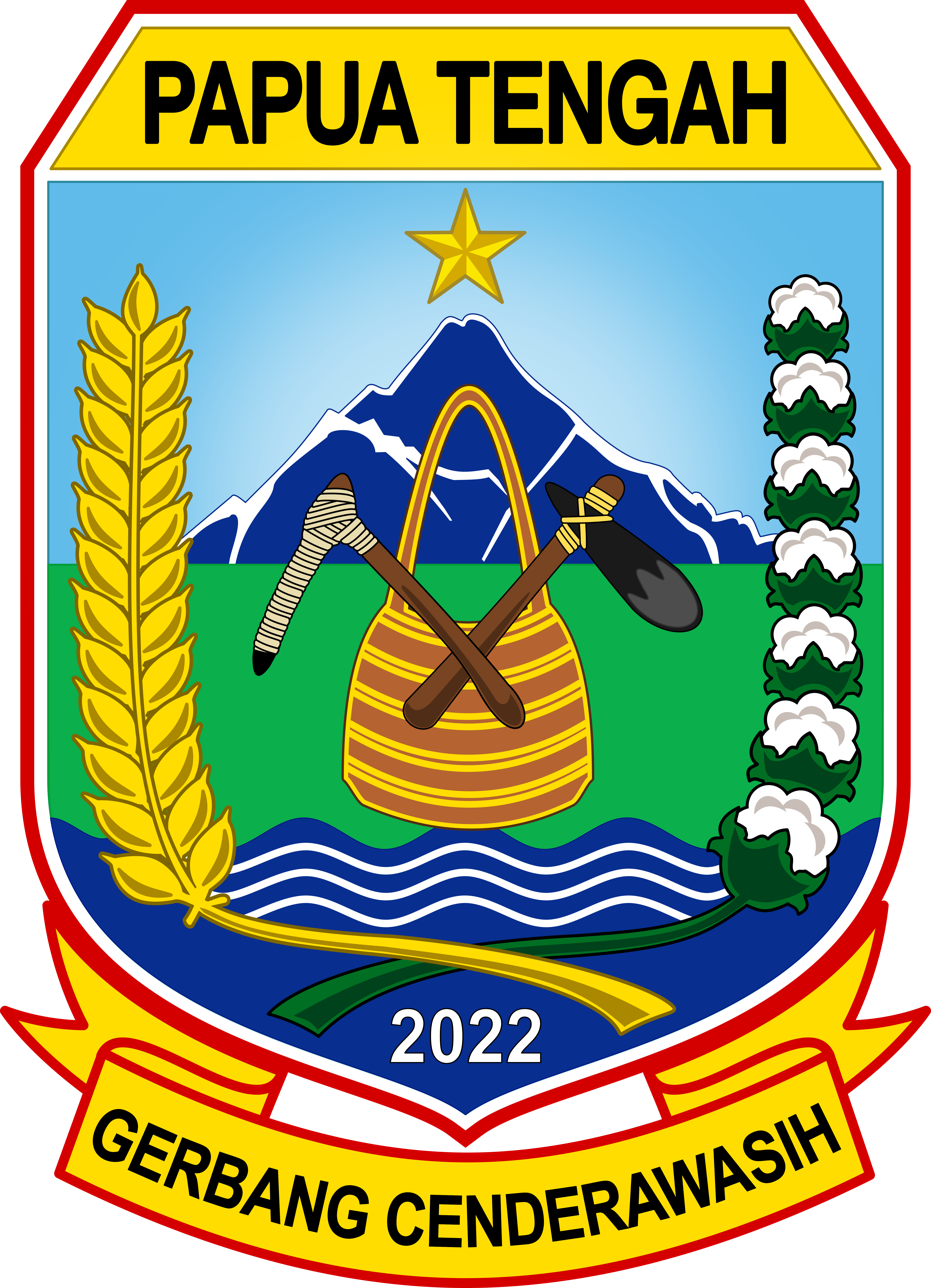
- Coat of arms
- Motto: Gerbang Cenderawasih (Gate of the Cenderawasih)
- Central Papua in Indonesia
- Interactive map of Central Papua
- Coordinates: 4°S 136°E
- Country: Indonesia
- Region: Western New Guinea (Eastern Indonesia)
- Established: 25 July 2022
- Capital: Wanggar, Nabire
- Largest city: Timika, Mimika

Government
  - Body: Central Papua Provincial Government
  - Governor: Meki Fritz Nawipa (PDI-P)
  - Vice Governor: Deinas Geley
  - Legislature: Central Papua House of Representatives (DPRPT)

Area
  - Total: 61,079.59 km^{2} (23,582.96 sq mi)
- Highest elevation (Puncak Jaya): 4,884 m (16,024 ft)

Population (mid 2025 estimate)
  - Total: 1,492,290
  - Density: 24.4319/km^{2} (63.2783/sq mi)

Languages
  - Official language: Indonesian
  - Native languages of Central Papua: Auye, Burate, Damal, Ekari, Kamoro, Keuw, Kuri, Lani, Moni, Nduga, Tarunggare, Wano, Wolani, Yaur, Yeresiam, and others
  - Also spoken: Javanese, Papuan Malay, and others

Demographics
  - Religions: Christianity 87.89% –Protestantism 68.52% –Catholicism 19.37% Islam 12.00% Hinduism 0.07% Buddhism 0.03% Other 0.01%
  - Ethnic groups: Amung, Damal, Ekari, Kamoro, Lani, Moni, Wate, Wolani, Yaur (native), Javanese (migrant), and others
- Time zone: UTC+9 (Indonesia Eastern Time)
- HDI (2024): ▲0.603 (37th) – (Medium)
- Website: papuatengahprov.go.id

Central Papua (Indonesian: Papua Tengah) is an Indonesian province located in the central region of Western New Guinea. It was formally established on 25 July 2022 from the former eight western regencies of the province of Papua. It covers an area of 61,079.59 km^{2} and had an officially estimated population of 1,492,290 in mid 2025 (comprising 793,480 males and 698,810 females), increasing by about 18,500 people per year. It is bordered by the Indonesian provinces of West Papua to the west, the province of Papua to the north and northeast, by Highland Papua to the east, and by South Papua to the southeast. The administrative capital is located in Wanggar District in Nabire Regency, although Timika (in Mimika Regency) is a larger town. Its traditional name is Mee Pago – Saireri.

Central Papua is bordered by seas to the north and south. Nabire is situated in the northern part of Central Papua, Indonesia. This lowland area is directly adjacent to the Teluk Cenderawasih National Park and boasts immense potential for marine tourism including coral reefs, white sandy islands, and whale sharks in their natural habitat. The southern part of Central Papua is mostly swampy terrain and the location of the port of Amamapare and Timika, the largest town in this province. The central region of Central Papua is dominated by the Jayawijaya Mountains, which encompasses the snow-capped Puncak Jaya, the highest peak in Indonesia. This mountain range is also home to the Grasberg gold mine, operated by Freeport Indonesia.

The provincial border roughly follows the cultural region of Mee Pago and parts of Saireri.

== History ==
=== Sultanate of Tidore era ===
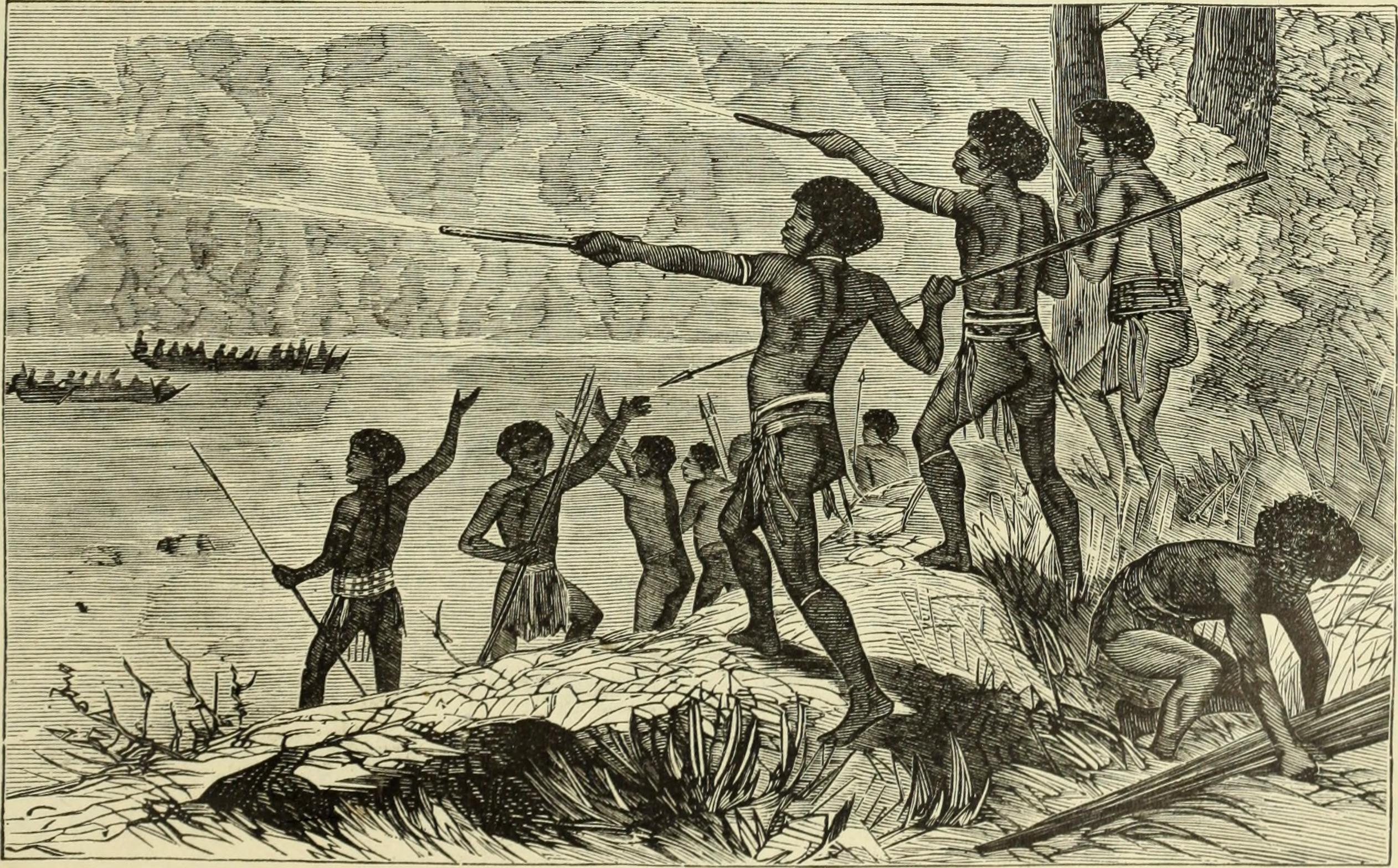
Outanata (the Kamoro from Uta) and their weapons, 1870.

Since the 18th century, the western region of Mimika has been the furthest reach of the Tidore Sultanate's "Uli Siwa" influence on the south-west coast of Papua Island. The region was influenced primarily by three major ethnic groups, the Koiwai, Kamoro, and Asmat. The trade relations for slaves, ironwares, clothes, and body ornaments that were established exerted a great deal of influence on the local population with the use of titles of Moluccan origin (raja, mayor, kapitan, and orang tua) as well as the Islamic culture of the people such as the use of turbaned hats and the custom of not eating pork until the 1950s.

The trading centre of the region is Kipia, led by a leader named Naowa, who received the title of king from Lamora, Namatota (Koiwai) King. Kipia led a confederation of Kamoro villages called Tarya We, along with Poraoka, Maparpe, Wumuka, Umar, and Aindua. They co-operated because the region lacked sago and intimidated the more fertile region to the east with canoes and minaki (firearms) received from trade. Meanwhile, in the east there was a major war called the Tipuka War where Tipuka village was destroyed by Koperapoka assisted by a coalition of Mware, Pigapu, Hiripau, and Miyoko which was thought to be revenge for Tipuka kidnapping people for trade. This trade relationship and influence from the Moluccas gradually disappeared with the strengthening of Dutch colonialism, and the influx of Catholic missionaries and Chinese traders.

=== Dutch East Indies era ===
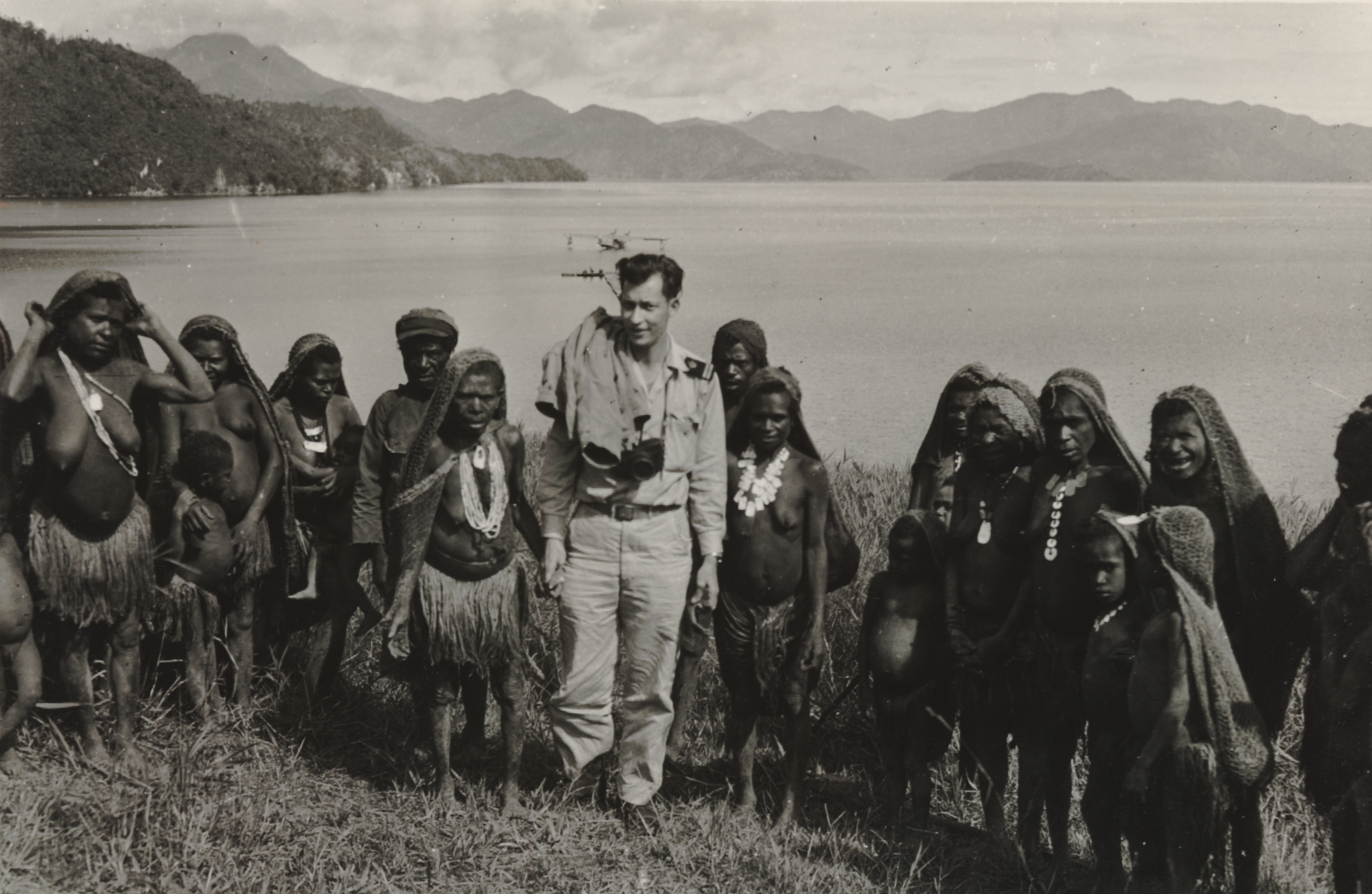
Colonial officer J.V. de Bruyn alongside the Ekari (Mee) people in Wisselmeeren.

The interior of Central Papua is inhabited by ethnic groups such as the Mee (Ekari) and Moni, who live traditionally by clearing fields and cultivating tubers, raising pigs, fishing, and engaging in feasting. They had formed trade relations with coastal tribes using mege currency made from shells. These indigenous communities were first discovered by Western explorers during the British Ornithologists' Union 1909–1911 expedition to Western New Guinea. They were called Tapiro pygmies on account of their shorter height compared to the Papuans, i.e., the Kamoro. Later in the 1930s, a Dutch pilot named Frits Wissel flew over the highland area and came across three large lakes where the Mee people resided. The lakes were named Paniai, Tigi, and Tage, and the Dutch referred to the region as Wisselmeeren (Wissel Lakes). However, after the Dutch colonial era, the name Paniai became more widely used than Wisselmeeren.

During the Round Table Conference on 27 December 1949. The Dutch East Indies government issued a proclamation stating that the territory of Papua controlled by the Dutch East Indies would be under the jurisdiction of a gubernemen called the New Guinea Gouvernement. Later in 1952 New Guinea was designated as an overseas province of the Netherlands. Dutch New Guinea was officially divided into four Afdeling on 10 May 1952. The district of Central New Guinea was one of the four afdelings and included Wisselmeren as an onderafdeling. However, unlike the other districts, the Central New Guinea afdeling did not have a capital city. The New Guinea Government underwent further reorganisation in 1954 and the Central New Guinea afdeling was temporarily placed directly under the supervision of the Resident of Geelvinkbaai (now Cenderawasih Bay).

=== Entry of Freeport Indonesia ===
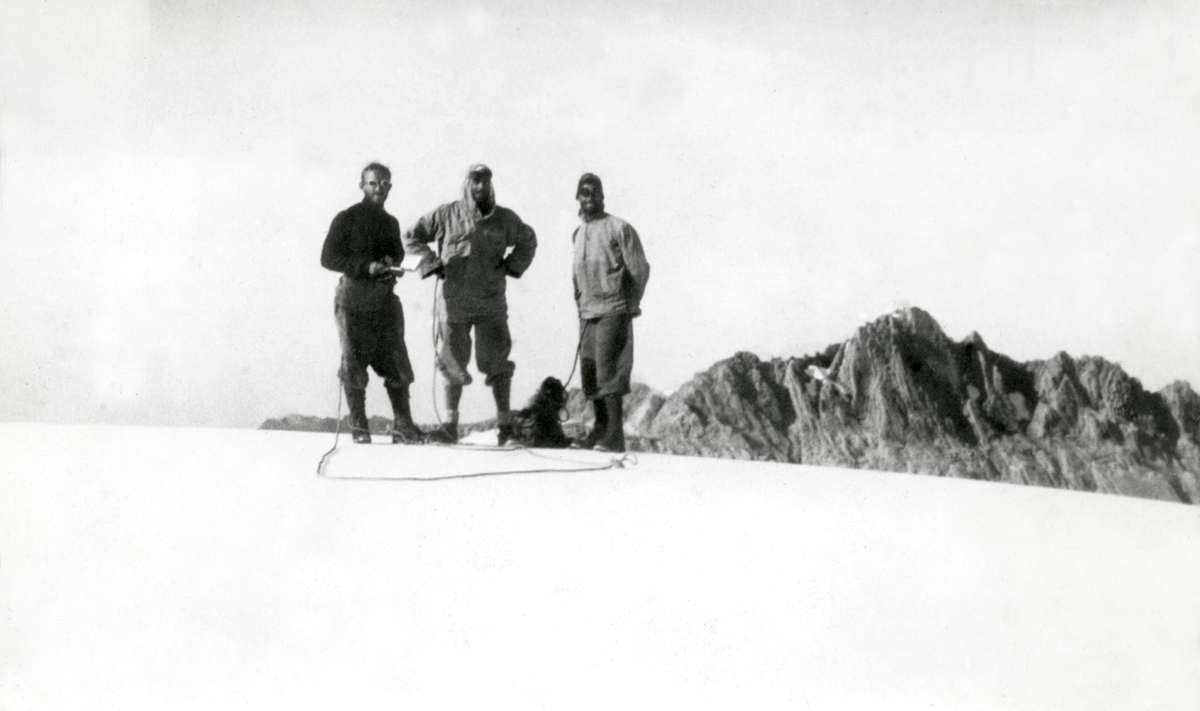
Carstensz expedition member in the snow-capped mountain of New Guinea.

In 1936, the Carstensz expedition, led by Anton Colijn from the Netherlands, conquered Puncak Jaya, the highest mountain in Papua. Among the members of the team was a geologist named Jean Jacques Dozy, who discovered large copper deposits in one of the places they passed. This location was later named Ore Mountain or "Ertsberg" and was published. Reports about this site were ultimately forgotten due to World War II. However, in 1963, the Freeport Sulfur Company discovered this valuable report and sent an expedition to confirm the existence of this natural wealth. The team, led by Forbes Wilson, included geologists Delos Flint. They succeeded in discovering enormous potential in the region, leading to the signing of the first contract with the Government of Indonesia under President Suharto, who had just passed Law No. 1 of 1967 concerning Foreign Investment. Forbes Wilson later became the President of Freeport Indonesia. In 1970, the mine was opened, and the Amungme people were relocated to another area. Apart from opening a mine, Freeport also built supporting infrastructure, including Amamapare Port in the Kamoro Tribe area and a settlement called Kuala Kencana in 1995. The company then opened a new mine, the Grasberg mine in Tembagapura, which contains gold and signed the second contract in 1991.

=== Provincial proposal ===
==== During the New Order ====
Efforts to split Papua Province (formerly known as Irian Jaya Province) have been made since the reign of Governor Busiri Suryowinoto. At that time, President Suharto encouraged the division of Irian Jaya Province to increase Irian Jaya's representation in the central legislature and to facilitate development in the region. The idea of expansion was also put forward at a seminar on "Local Government Development" in 1982.

Before his death in early August 1982, Busiri put forward three different proposals for the division of the province, which were considered by Kompas journalist Korano Nicolash LMS as the first concept that "contained a comprehensive and detailed division of Irian Jaya into three provinces". One of Busiri's proposals was to divide Irian Jaya into three provinces, namely East Irian Jaya, Central Irian Jaya, and West Irian Jaya. The Central Irian Jaya province consisted of the districts of Mapurajaya, Nabire, Enarotali (Paniai), Mulia, Yapen-Waropen (Serui), and Teluk Cenderawasih (Biak). Although this expansion proposal was never realised, President Suharto approved the division of Irian Jaya into three assistant governorates in 1984.

==== Expansion in 1999 and 2003 ====
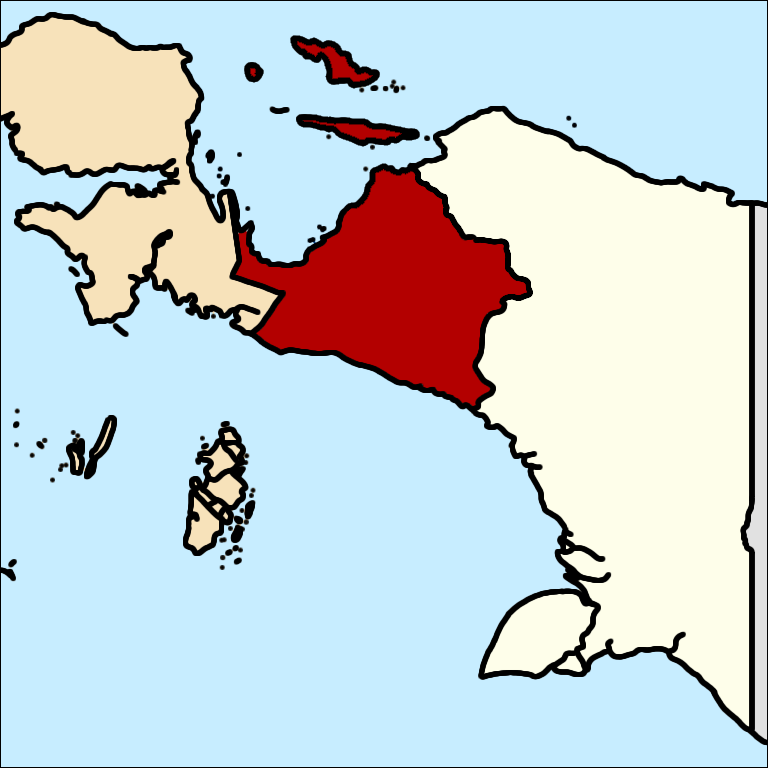
Map of the province of Central Papua based on proposals in 1999 and 2003. It can be seen from the map that the Biak and Yapen Islands, as well as Waropen Regency on the mainland of Papua, were at that time proposed to be included in this province

After several years of delay, President B.J. Habibie approved the division of Irian Jaya Province. The province of Irian Jaya was divided into the provinces of Irian Jaya, West Irian Jaya, and Central Irian Jaya through Law Number 45 of 1999 which was enacted on 4 October 1999. Former Assistant Governor of Region II Herman Monim was then inaugurated as the first Governor of Central Irian Jaya on 12 October 1999. However, the division of Irian Jaya Province was opposed by the Irian Jaya DPRD and the DPRD unilaterally cancelled the division four days later. The central government recognised the validity of the decision issued by the Irian Jaya DPRD and the law was withdrawn.

After Irian Jaya was renamed Papua in 2000, demands for the division of Papua province resurfaced. On 23 August 2003, Andreas Anggaibak (Chairman of the Mimika DPRD), Jacobus Muyapa (Chairman of the Paniai DPRD), and Philip Wona (Regent of Yapen Waropen) declared the formation of Central Papua province. As a result of the declaration, the community in the Central Papua region was polarised into two groups, those who supported and those who rejected the division of Central Papua province. The two groups fought and held each other hostage for about a week until finally the central government issued a decision to postpone the division of the province on 28 August. The two parties finally decided to reconcile the day after the decision was issued by the central government. The fighting left five people dead and dozens injured.

==== Regency expansion ====
After independence, the current Central Papua region was administered under Paniai Regency and Fakfak Regency (the rest of Fakfak regency now lies in West Papua Province). In 1966, the capital of Paniai was moved from Enarotali in the interior to Nabire on the coast because it was easily accessible by sea transportation, making it strategically important as a gateway to other inland areas. Then, according to Government Regulation Number 52 of 1996, Paniai Regency with Nabire as its capital was renamed Nabire Regency, followed by the establishment of a new Paniai Regency with Enarotali as its capital, and Puncak Jaya Regency with Mulia as its capital. Furthermore, the further expansion was enacted in Law Number 45 of 1999, which also resulted in the splitting of Mimika Regency with Timika as its capital from Fakfak Regency.

After the enactment of the Law on Regional Autonomy, proposals for the formation of new regions began to emerge so that the number of regencies and cities increased rapidly. In 2008, the area now comprising Central Papua Region itself expanded from four regencies to eight. The eastern part of Paniai Regency was split off to form a Intan Jaya Regency, the Paniai area around Lake Tigi was split off to form a Deiyai Regency, the southern side of Nabire Regency was separated into a regency called Dogiyai Regency, and finally the western part of Puncak Jaya Regency was split off to form a Puncak Regency.

==== Establishment of Central Papua and capital debate ====
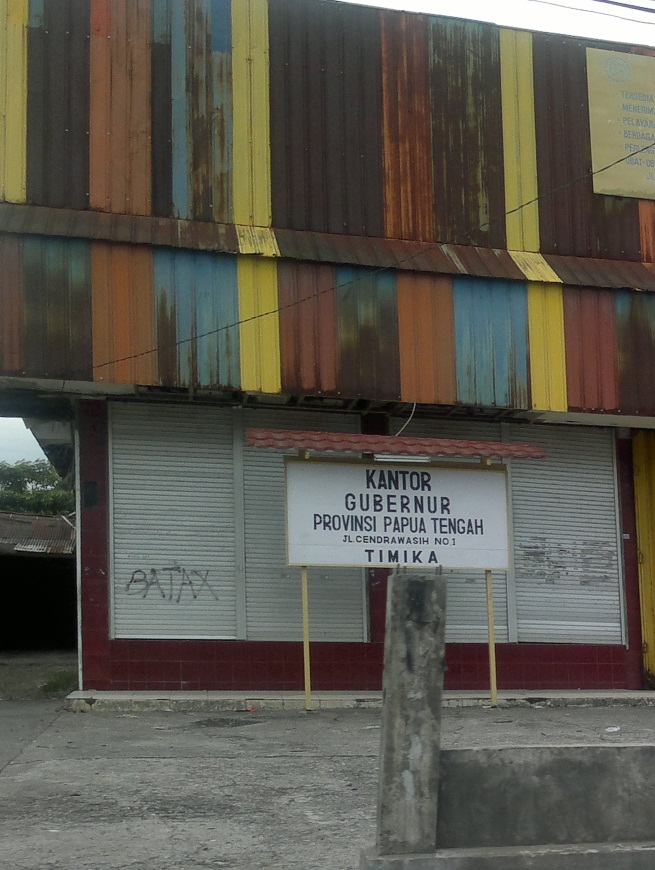
Former planned Governor building of Central Papua Province in Timika.

Regents from 7 regencies in Papua signed support for the division of Central Papua in a letter dated 1 November 2019. In the discussion, Mimika and Puncak regencies chose Timika to be the capital, while six other regencies (Nabire, Dogiyai, Deiyai, Paniai, Intan Jaya, and Puncak Jaya) wanted the capital in Nabire Regency. The difference of opinion is because Mimika Regency facilities are considered more feasible to become the capital of Central Papua Province, on the other hand, Nabire is more easily accessible by road by several other regencies. Finally, the working committee of the DOB Bill has determined Nabire Regency as the capital of Central Papua followed by the ratification of Central Papua as a new province at the DPR plenary meeting on 30 June 2022.

After the approval of the bill for the creation of the province on 30 June 2022, controversy regarding the capital of the new province resulted in mass demonstrations in Timika. Residents of the town argued that the provincial capital should be in Timika instead of Nabire, due to Timika's contribution to the province's economy through the presence of Freeport-McMoRan in their regency. Protesters also argued that the last 20 years of the effort by locals to support the creation of Central Papua province was always with Timika as capital and not Nabire. The protesters also threatened to close the Freeport mine by force if their demand to be the capital of the new province was not heard. However, figures from Nabire further argued that Nabire is a more suitable capital because it is free from intervention from the mining company on its development and also that Nabire has a higher percentage of native Papuans compared to Timika. Social conflict between residents of Nabire and Timika regarding the position of the new provincial capital was described by the Rev. Dora Balubun, representative from GKI Papua regional synod, as a dangerous side effect of the creation of the new province.

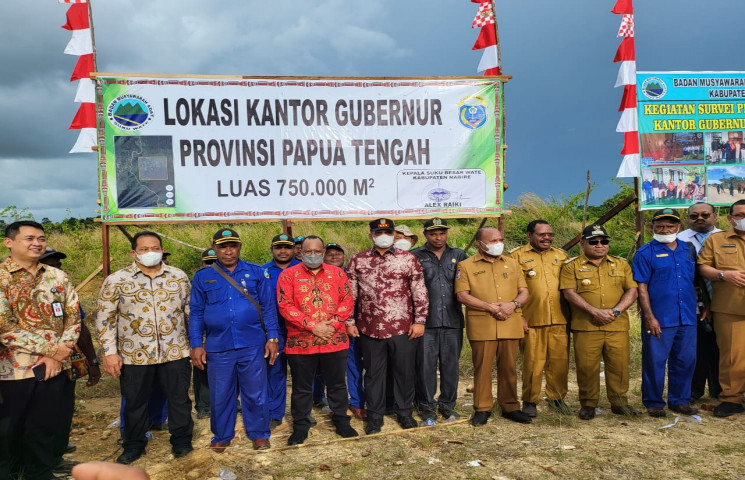
Location of the new Government Office in Wanggar, Nabire

On 25 July 2022, Indonesian President Joko Widodo passed Law Number 15 of Year 2022 Concerning the Establishment of Central Papua Province as the basis for the establishment of the province. The Wate people community fully supports the location of the capital in Nabire with the use of an additional 300 hectares of land located in Karadiri II Village, Wanggar District, Nabire Regency to become the central government facility (Praspem) of Central Papua Province. To support the new provincial capital, the Central Papua Government also plans to build a new airport in Wanggar. This airport project has actually been built from 2019 to 2021, but was not completed and abandoned due to budget shortages. As of 22 February 2024, the new Douw Aturure Nabire Airport has been in use.

=== Security incidents ===
Since its annexation into Indonesia in 1963 after New York Agreement, the Papua region has been plagued by a series of violent events perpetrated by different factions, including the Free Papua Movement (OPM) and local groups. OPM operates predominantly in mountainous regions like Tembagapura, Intan Jaya, Puncak, and Puncak Jaya, engaging in criminal activities such as arson against public infrastructure and residential homes, lethal attacks on civilians, and shooting aircraft. In addition to acts of terrorism by OPM, societal unrest often erupts, leading to significant material damages and casualties. Notable incidents include the torching of over 30 residences in Dogiyai's capital in May 2022, the destruction of numerous stalls at Waghete Market in Deiyai during a dispute between vendors and customers in December 2022, an arson attack targeting a truck driver in Dogiyai resulting in the burning of several kiosks in January 2023, the deliberate burning of the Dogiyai Regional People's Representative Council (DPRD) building in March 2023, a land dispute between the Dani and Mee tribes in Urumusu Village, Nabire, which claimed two lives and razed 21 houses in June 2023, and the torching of 69 structures in Dogiyai in July 2023 following a confrontation with a Mobile Brigade Corps convoy.

== Geography ==
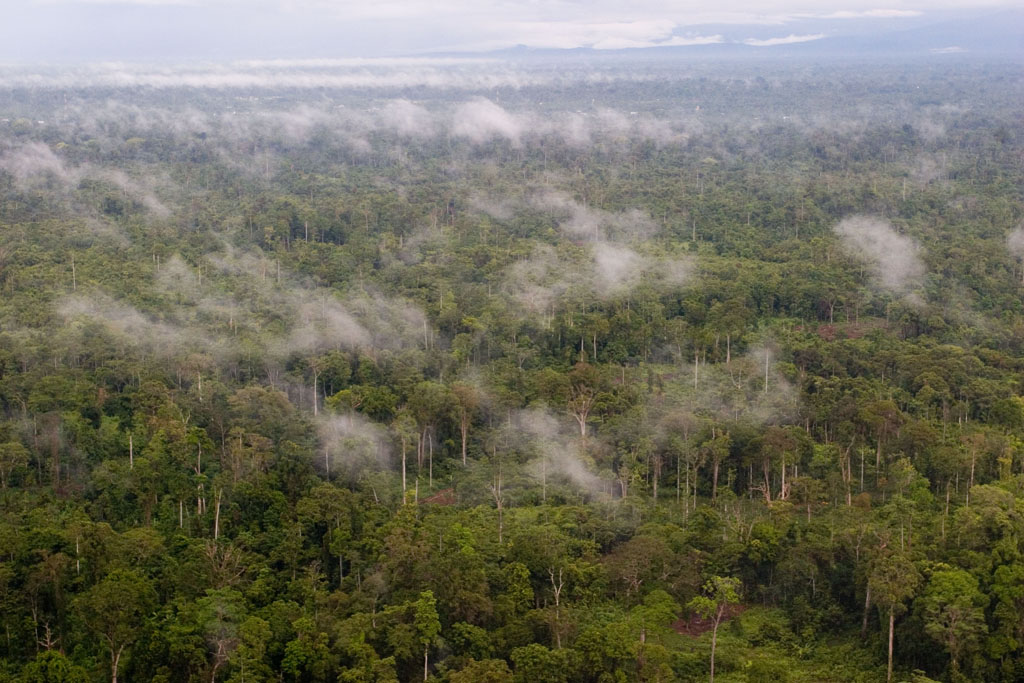
Forest in Agimuga, Mimika

Central Papua is bordered by the Indonesian provinces of West Papua to the west, the province of Papua and Cenderawasih Bay to the north and northeast, by Highland Papua to the east. and by South Papua and Arafura Sea to the south and southeast.

Central Papua can be split into three main areas: the Cenderawasih Bay region in the north, which consists of lowlands and coastal areas and is where the provincial capital in Nabire Regency is located; the New Guinea Highlands in the middle; and the lowlands and coast in the south, which is where Mimika Regency is situated. The New Guinea Highlands, also known as the Jayawijaya Mountains or Sudirman Range, run through the center of Papua Island, stretching from Central Papua to Papua New Guinea. These mountains boast several peaks rising over 4,000 meters above sea level. Puncak Jaya, the highest peak in Indonesia and Oceania, stands at over 4,800 meters above sea level and is covered by Carstensz Glacier. These mountains serve as the source of water for major rivers that flow both north and south.

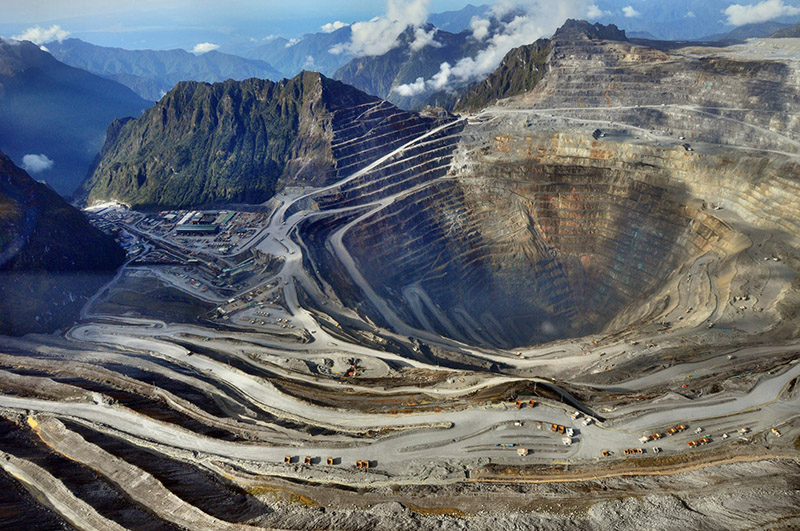
Grasberg mine in Jayawijaya Mountain

Among the mountains lie numerous valleys, reaching altitudes of over 1,500 meters above sea level, serving as settlements for indigenous tribes, for example the Mee people. Within this region, three sizable lakes known as Paniai Lakes consisting of Lake Paniai, Tigi, and Tage are found. The capitals of Paniai and Deiyai are situated on the shores of these lakes. They serve as vital sources of freshwater fisheries for the local communities. The fertile land in these valleys makes them ideal for agriculture, primarily cultivating sweet potatoes, a staple food. Additionally, there are endeavors to grow other crops such as the Moanemani variety of coffee in the Kamuu Valley in Dogiyai. Despite their fertility, certain areas are vulnerable to frost due to extremely cold temperatures, leading to crop failure. Tragically, famine disaster ensued, claiming lives, for example in Agandugume and Lambewi in Puncak Regency. The lack of adequate infrastructure and the prevalence of Free Papua Organization terrorist activities pose significant challenges in delivering aid to these affected areas.

The lowland areas of Central Papua have flatter terrains, fostering rapid development and drawing in numerous immigrants, particularly in bustling hubs like Timika, one of the region's largest cities, and Nabire, the provincial capital. Both Nabire and Mimika are key destinations for transmigration program, along with the establishment of rice fields and oil palm plantations. Despite being lowland areas, Mimika's southern region primarily comprises Southern New Guinea lowland rain forests ecoregion, resembling South Papua, alongside mangrove zones inhabited by the Kamoro and Sempan tribes. The Nabire coast is part of the Teluk Cenderawasih National Park, featuring pristine white sandy beaches, islands, and waters teeming with diverse marine life, including whale sharks and vibrant coral reefs.

The northern area of Mimika Regency are within the Jayawijaya Mountains, home to the Grasberg mine operated by Freeport Indonesia for gold mining purposes. To support its operations, Freeport established a small town called Tembagapura. Unfortunately, the waste or tailings from this mining activity is discharged into rivers in Mimika, including the Ajkwa and Otomona Rivers, resulting in their contamination and abundance of mud. Despite the environmental impact, people from surrounding this area utilize this mud to search for residual gold using basic tools.

== Politics ==
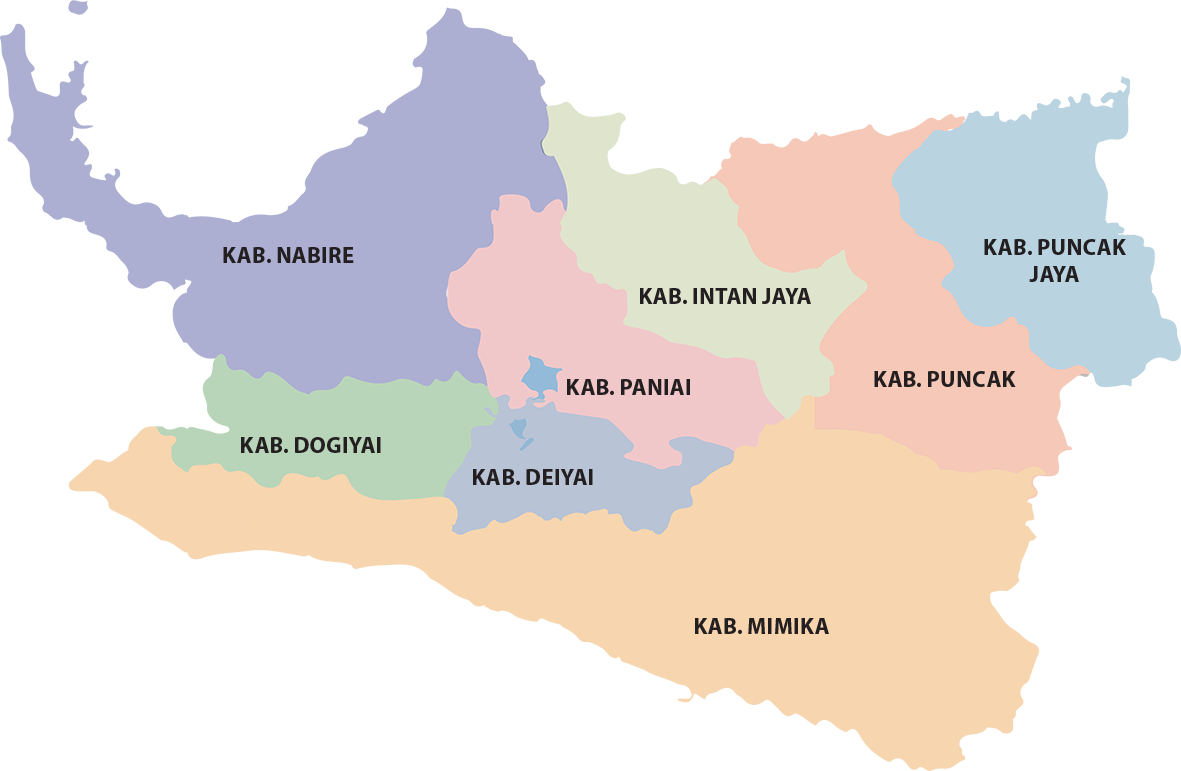
Central Papua administrative divisions

=== Government and administrative divisions ===
The area now constituting Central Papua was originally composed of four regencies - Mimika, Nabire, Paniai and Puncak Jaya. Two new regencies were created on 4 January 2008 - Dogiyai from part of Nabire Regency, and Puncak from part of Puncak Jaya Regency. Two further regencies were created on 29 October 2008 - Deiyai and Intan Jaya, both from parts of Paniai Regency. The new province comprises eight regencies (and no administrative cities), listed below with their areas and their populations at the 2010 and 2020 Censuses and according to the official estimates as at mid 2025. The table also includes the regency capitals and a list of the districts (kecamatan) within each regency.

Kode Wilayah	Name of Regency	Capital	List of Districts	Area in km^{2}	Pop'n Census 2010	Pop'n Census 2020	Pop'n Estimate mid 2025	HDI (2020)
94.01	Nabire Regency	Nabire	Dipa, Makimi, Menou, Moora, Nabire, Nabire Barat, Napan, Siriwo, Teluk Kimi, Teluk Umar, Uwapa, Wanggar, Wapoga, Yaro, Yaur	11,801.99	129,893	169,136	176,930	0.688 (Medium)
94.02	Puncak Jaya Regency	Mulia	Dagai, Dokome, Fawi, Gubume, Gurage, Ilamburawi, Ilu, Irimuli, Kalome, Kiyage, Lumo, Mewoluk, Molanikime, Muara, Mulia, Nioga, Nume, Pagaleme, Taganombak, Tingginambut, Torere, Waegi, Wanwi, Yambi, Yamo, Yamoneri	5,986.19	101,148	224,527	237,440	0.484 (Low)
94.03	Paniai Regency	Enarotali	Aradide, Aweida, Baya Biru, Bibida, Bogabaida, Deiyai Miyo, Dogomo, Dumadama, Ekadide, Kebo, Muye, Nakama, Paniai Barat, Paniai Timur (Enarotali), Pugo Dagi, Siriwo, Teluk Deya, Topiyai, Wegee Bino, Wegee Muka, Yagai, Yatamo, Youtadi	5,306.87	153,432	220,410	240,340	0.563 (Medium)
94.04	Mimika Regency	Timika	Agimuga, Alama, Amar, Hoya, Iwaka, Jila, Jita, Kuala Kencana, Kwamki Narama, Mimika Barat, Mimika Barat Jauh, Mimika Barat Tengah, Mimika Baru (Timika), Mimika Tengah, Mimika Timur, Mimika Timur Jauh, Tembagapura, Wania	18,309.72	182,001	311,969	331,630	0.742 (High)
94.05	Puncak Regency	Ilaga	Agandugume, Amungkalpia, Beoga, Beoga Barat, Beoga Timur, Bina, Dervos, Doufo, Erelmakawia, Gome, Gome Utara, Ilaga, Ilaga Utara, Kembru, Lambewi, Mabugi, Mage'abume, Ogamanim, Omukia, Oneri, Pogoma, Sinak, Sinak Barat, Wangbe, Yugumuak	7,701.03	93,218	114,741	124,410	0.430 (Low)
94.06	Dogiyai Regency	Kigamani	Dogiyai, Kamu (Kigimani), Kamu Selatan, Kamu Timur, Kamu Utara, Mapia, Mapia Barat, Mapia Tengah, Piyaiye, Sukikai Selatan	3,792.93	84,230	116,206	127,270	0.548 (Low)
94.07	Intan Jaya Regency	Sugapa	Agisiga, Biandoga, Hitadipa, Homeyo, Sugapa, Tomosiga, Ugimba, Wandai	5,334.45	40,490	135,043	145,900	0.478 (Low)
94.08	Deiyai Regency	Waghete	Bowobado, Kapiraya, Tigi (Waghete), Tigi Barat, Tigi Timur	2,846.41	62,119	99,091	108,360	0.495 (Low)
Totals				61,079.59	846,531	1,391,123	1,492,290	

The province now forms one of Indonesia's 84 national electoral districts to elect members to the People's Representative Council. The Central Papua Electoral District consists of all of the 8 regencies in the province and elects 3 members to the People's Representative Council.

== Demographics and culture ==
=== Ethnic groups ===
Nabire is inhabited by coastal tribes belonging to the Saireri customary territory, including Yaur, Wate, Mora, Umari, Goa, and Yerisiam as well as the tribes in the mountainous areas that are included in the Mee Pago customary territory, namely Mee and Auye (Napan). Located in central part of the province is region around Paniai Lakes inhabited by, other than the aforementioned, Moni and Wolani. Meanwhile, to the east lie the Jayawijaya Mountains, which are inhabited by Amungme, Damalme, Wano, alongside Dani, Lani, and Nduga (Dauwa) which can also be found in the neighbouring province of Highland Papua. While the southern part of Central Papua is Mimika Regency in the form of swamp land and is inhabited by Mimika (Kamoro) and Sempan.

=== Culture ===
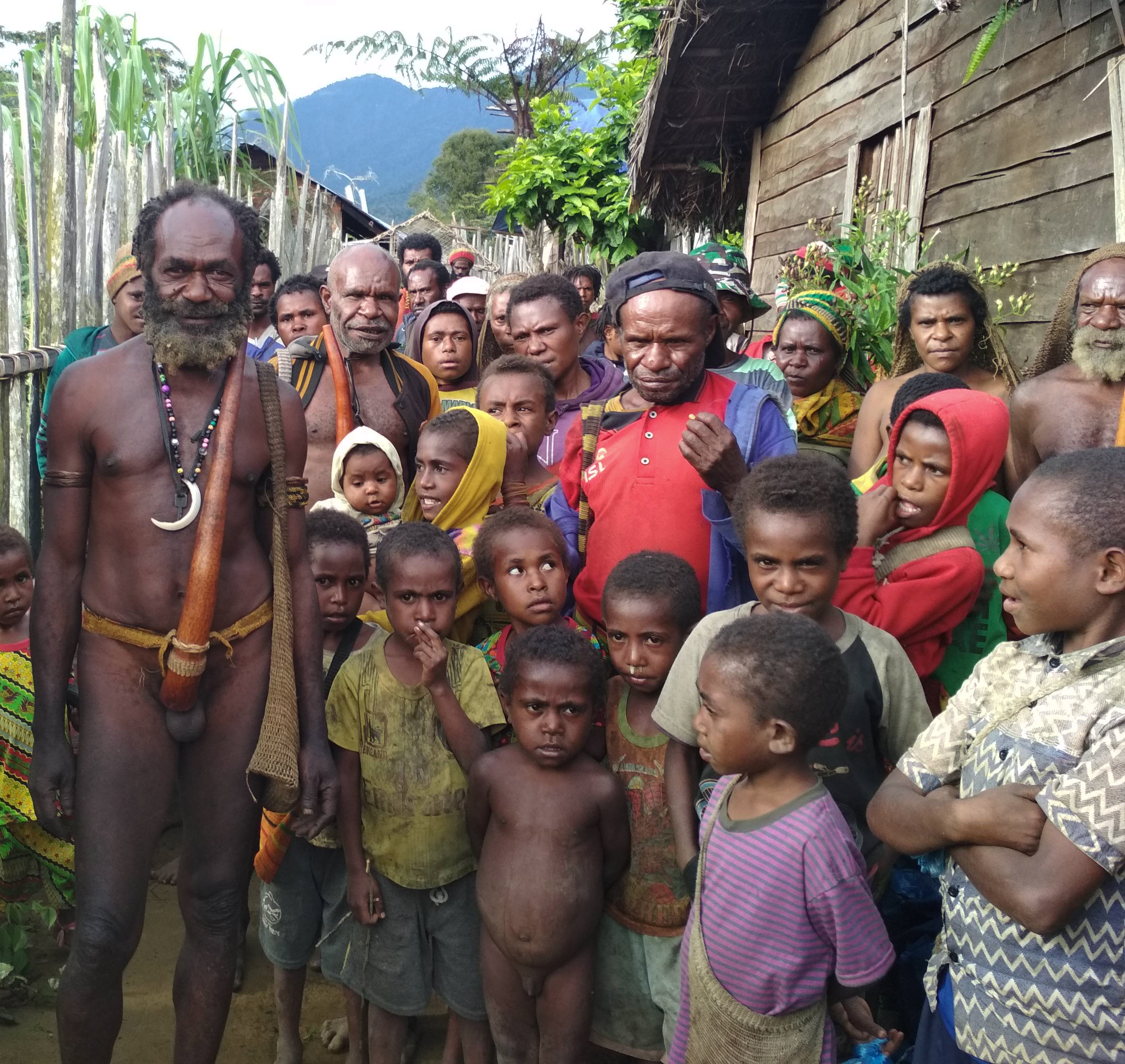
Local tribe wearing koteka

Central Papua have diverse cultural practices because of their adaption to local geography. For example, Saireri region in coastal Nabire have different culture compared to mountain groups of Mee Pago in Paniai Lakes and surrounding area. Some of these cultures become part of Intangible cultural heritage conserved by Ministry of Education and Culture.

Koteka is a traditional male genital covering worn by various inland tribes in the mountainous regions of Central Papua, including the Amungme, Damal, Mee, Moni, and Wano tribes. It is crafted from a calabash (Lagenaria siceraria), hollowed out and scorched. During the New Order era, the government initiated Operation Koteka to phase out the use of koteka and encourage the adoption of modern clothing. This included a strategy of air-dropping tens of tons of clothing into the interior regions. While the everyday use of koteka has gradually declined, they are still preserved and worn on special occasions or for tourism purposes.

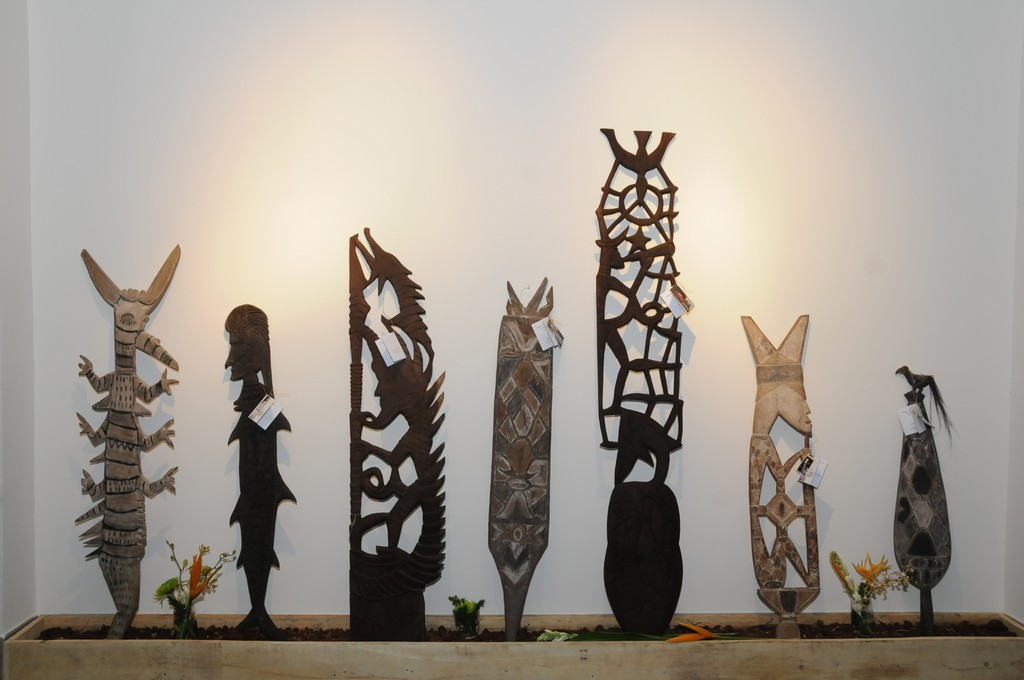
Kamoro wood carving exhibit

The art of wood carving thrives among tribes residing along the southern coast of Papua, notably the Asmat people in South Papua and the Kamoro tribe in Mimika, situated on the southern coast of Central Papua. While Asmat carving enjoys global recognition, Kamoro carving art, also known as "maramowe," is relatively lesser known. Efforts are underway to promote Kamoro carving and facilitate wider market access for its artisans. This intricate art form encompasses various creations such as "yamate" (shields), "wemawe" (human statues), and "mbitoro" (ancestral poles). Mbitoro, crafted from mangrove wood and adorned with intricate carvings of human figures, bears resemblance to the Bisj poles crafted by the Asmat tribe. These mbitoro poles are often prominently displayed in front of Karapau traditional houses, serving as significant cultural symbols.

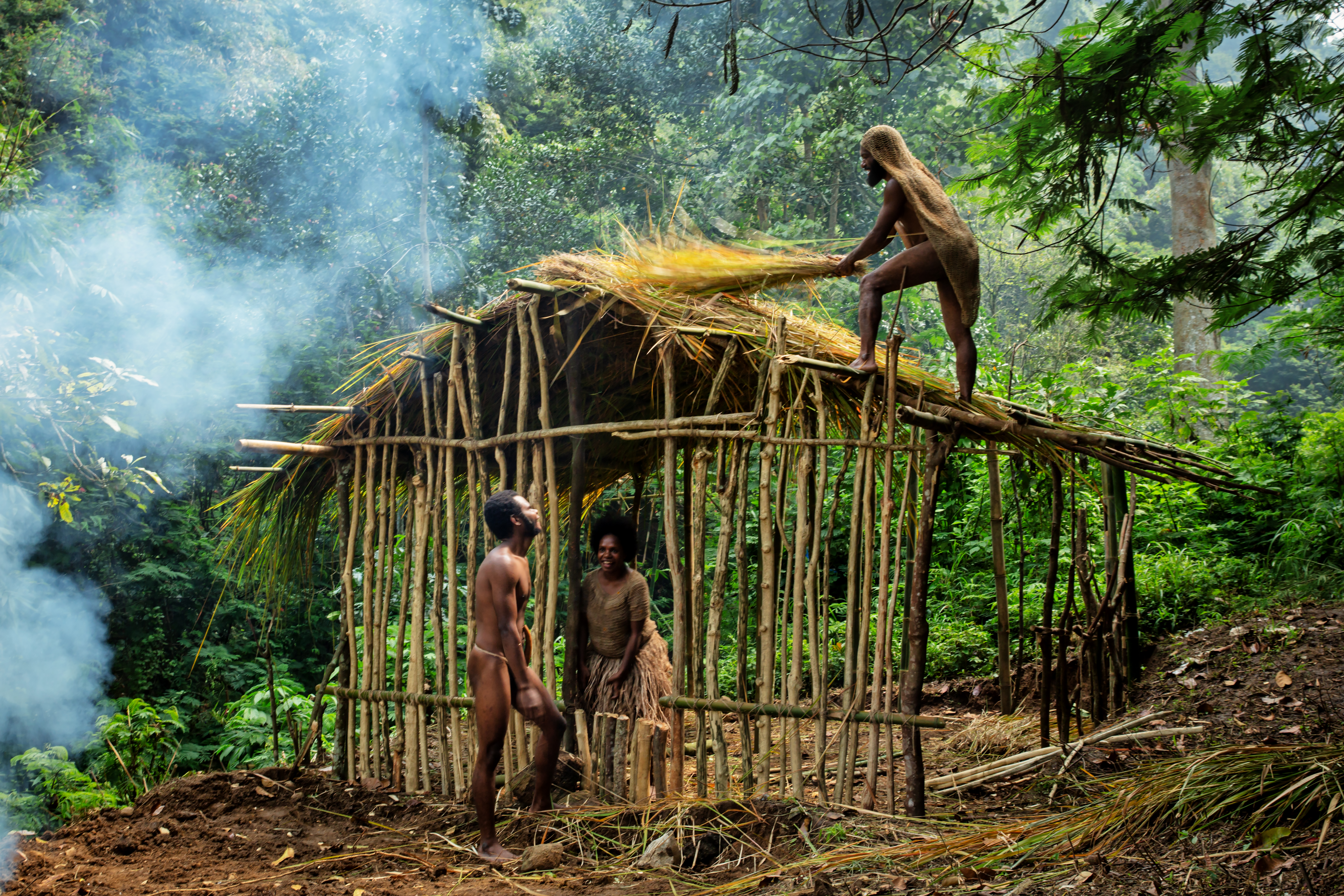
Emawa house of Mee people

Traditional houses in Central Papua exhibit diverse architectural styles influenced by the culture and geographical features of each region. Examples include the Kunume of the Dani people (Lani) in Puncak Jaya, the emawa house of the Mee people in Paniai, Deiyai, and Dogiyai, and the karapao house of the Kamoro tribe in Mimika. The Mee tribe resides in the highlands near Lakes Paniai, Tigi, and Tage. Their traditional houses are modest yet functional, typically constructed with wooden walls and thatched roofs made from leaves or alang-alang grass. The emawa house of the Mee tribe comprises three main sections: an attic for storing arrows, firewood, and other items; a middle room containing a bed and a fire pit; and the ground level beneath the house, as these structures are built on stilts to adapt to the region's fluctuating lake and river levels. Additionally, the Mee tribe categorizes their traditional houses into "jame owaa" for men, "kegita owaa" for women, and "uguwo owaa" for families.

== Economy ==
=== Mining ===
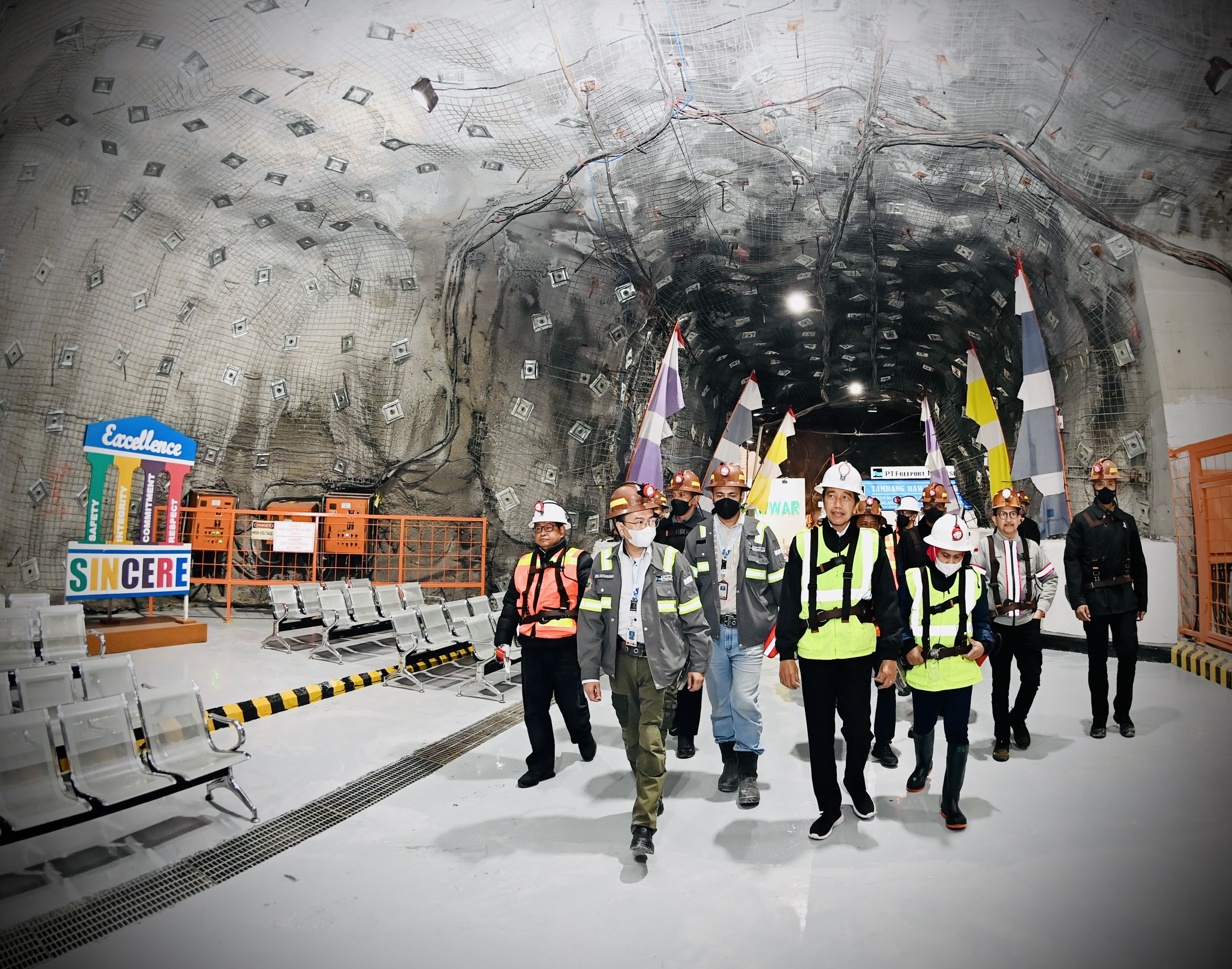
Inside of Grasberg mine visited by the President Joko Widodo

Central Papua is rich in mining resources, with notable sites such as Ertsberg, Grasberg mine, and the Wabu Block. The Grasberg mine stands as one of the world's largest gold mines, situated in the mountainous terrain of Mimika Regency. Operated by PT Freeport Indonesia (PTFI), a subsidiary of Freeport-McMoRan from the United States, Grasberg yields not only gold but also copper and silver. Supporting this mining operation, PTFI has established settlements like Kuala Kencana, Tembagapura, and the Amamapare port. According to the Statistics Indonesia, the largest exports from Papua Island in 2021 were facilitated through this port. The Wabu Block, located in Intan Jaya Regency, also hosts significant gold deposits. Originally under Freeport's control, this area has been relinquished to the state, prompting numerous companies to plan exploratory ventures there.

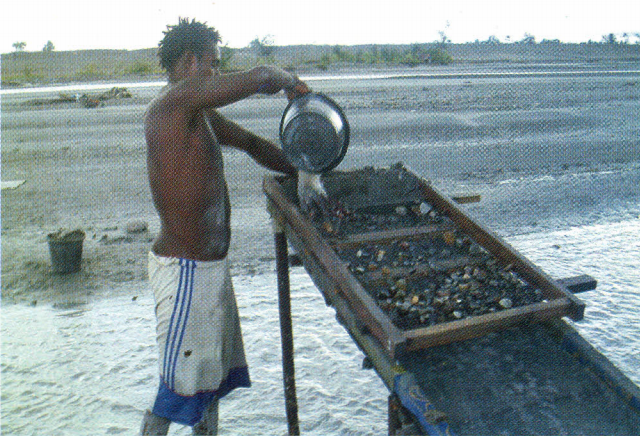
Informal gold panning by locals in one of the Mimika's polluted river

Locals conduct informal gold mining, notably along the Otomona and Ajkwa Rivers in Mimika, where PT Freeport Indonesia disposes of its mining waste. Using basic tools like pans and sieves, gold prospectors brave heavy rains and flooding in pursuit of gold. Similar activities occur in places like Topo, Nabire Regency, and Baya Biru, Paniai Regency. Miners establish makeshift villages for temporary living and gold panning along riverbanks. Transporting necessities to Baya Biru proves costly, often relying on helicopters or small planes. Moreover, mining activities here are fraught with risks due to the presence of the Free Papua Organization.

=== Agriculture and fisheries ===
Nabire and Mimika Regencies have extensive oil palm plantation areas. In Nabire, PT Nabire Baru and PT Sariwana Adi Perkasa (SAP) oversee oil palm plantations within the traditional territory of the Kampung Simia of Yeresiam Gua tribe, located in Yaur District of Nabire. Mimika also have oil palm plantations, initially managed by PT Pusaka Agro Lestari (PAL) until its bankruptcy. Subsequently, the Mimika government auctioned PT PAL's land, which was acquired by PT Karya Bella Vita in 2022.

Mimika Regency holds significant potential in fisheries, prompting the central government to establish an Integrated Maritime and Fisheries Center ( Sentra Kelautan dan Perikaran Terpadu or SKPT) in 2017 to bolster the local economy. SKPT Mimika has proven to be quite successful, yielding tens of thousands of tons of fish annually, including mackerel, lemuru, manyung, gulamah, black pomfret, and sembilang. A considerable portion of the frozen fish is transported to major cities like Surabaya, Jakarta, Jayapura, and Merauke, while some are exported abroad to countries like Malaysia and Singapore. SKPT Mimika boasts comprehensive facilities such as a frozen warehouse and ice factory, attracting numerous fishing vessels to dock. Positioned in frontier area, SKPT aims to stimulate economic development in the region.

== Tourism ==
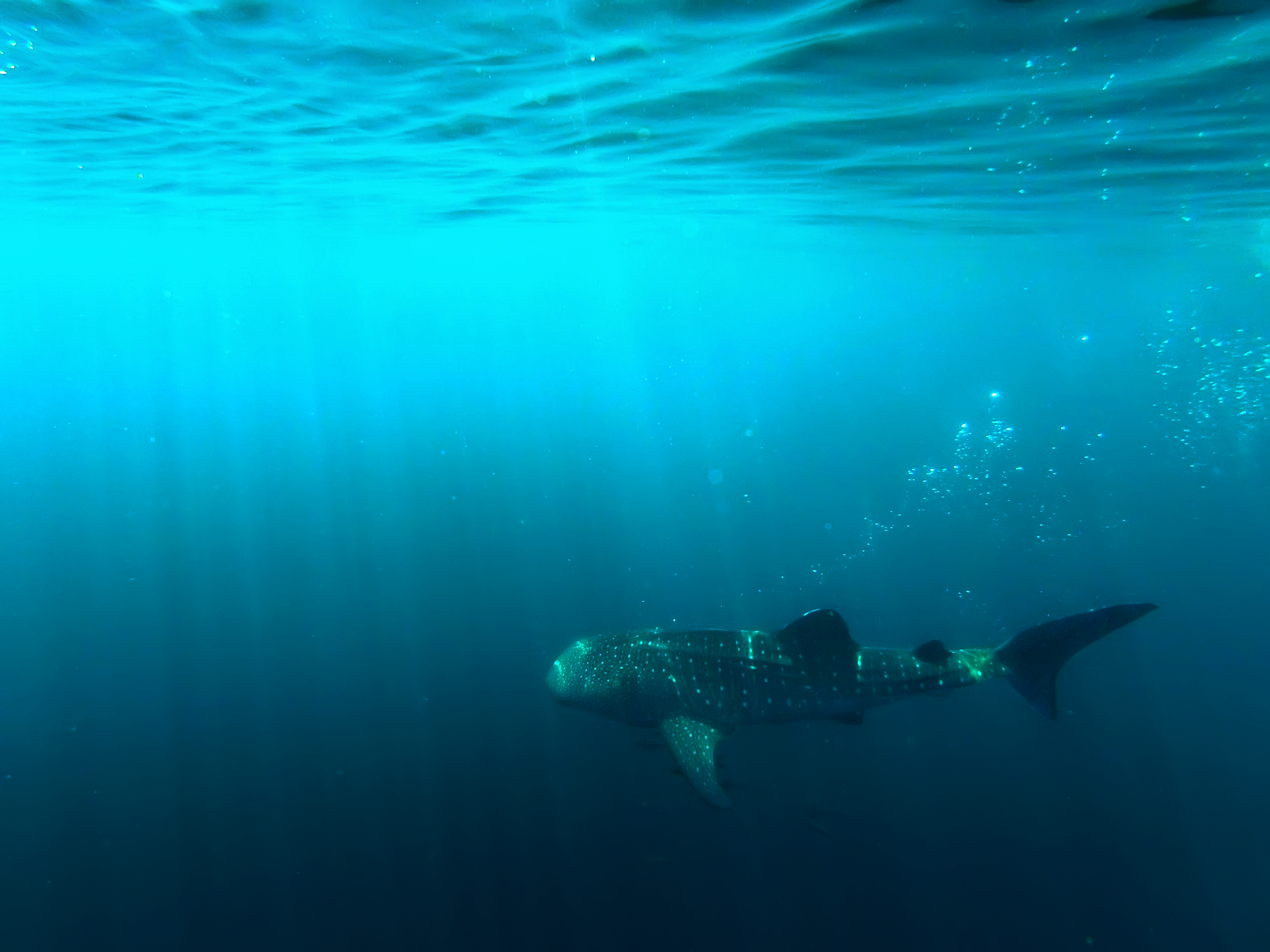
Whale shark in Teluk Cenderawasih National Park

There are multiple tourist destinations in Central Papua for example Teluk Cenderawasih National Park, Lorentz National Park, Jayawijaya Mountains, Paniai Lakes, and various traditional villages.

Teluk Cenderawasih National Park is a marine National Park situated on the border of West Papua and Central Papua, specifically in Nabire. It stands as a tourist destination with abundant natural treasures, characterized by azure seas adorned with pristine white sandy islands and coral reefs teeming with diverse marine life. In addition to its scenic beauty, visitors can also experience thrilling dives alongside whale sharks (Rhincodon typus), a majestic species found in Kwatisore.

The Jayawijaya Mountains stand as a mountain range in Papua, housing the highest peak in Indonesia and Oceania. This pinnacle, known as Puncak Jaya, Cartensz Pyramid, or Nemangkawi, reaches a height of 4,884 meters. As Oceania's highest mountain, Puncak Jaya holds a place among the Seven Summits, a list of the highest peaks on each continent as recognized by climber Reinhold Messner. Conquering these seven summits is pursued by mountaineers worldwide. Puncak Jaya's summit is adorned with icecaps, at risk of melting from climate change.

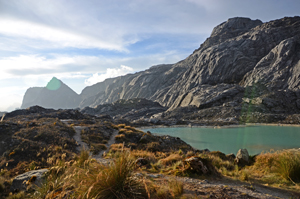
Lorentz National Park

Lorentz National Park is a sprawling protected area located at the confluence of three provinces: Highland Papua, Central Papua, and South Papua. Encompassing an expansive 2.5 million hectares, it stands as the largest national park in Southeast Asia and holds the title of being a UNESCO World Heritage Site. Renowned for its diverse ecosystems, Lorentz National Park spans from snow-capped mountains to lush tropical rainforests and extensive swamp areas, providing habitat for numerous endemic species. Established in 1997, the park is currently overseen by the Ministry of Environment and Forestry. Among its inhabitants are several indigenous tribes, including the Amungme tribe in the highlands and the Kamoro tribe in the lowlands.

== See also ==
- List of districts of Central Papua
- Papua
- Highland Papua
- South Papua
- West Papua
