= 2025–26 Liga 4 Central Papua =

Liga 4 Central Papua
- Season: 2025–26
- Dates: 9 – 17 March 2026
- Teams: 7
- Champions: Persipani
- Runner up: Persipuncak
- National phase: Persipani; Persipuncak
- Matches: 13
- Goals: 40 (3.08 per match)
- Top goalscorer: T. Rumatrai (4 goal)
- Biggest win: Persido 6–0 Persintan (11 March 2026)
- Highest scoring: Persintan 4–7 Persipuja (13 March 2026)
- Longest winning run: Persemi (2); Persido (2); Persipani (2)
- Longest unbeaten run: Persipani (4)
- Longest winless run: Persintan (3); Persemi (3)
- Longest losing run: Persintan (3); Persemi (3)
- All statistics correct as of 20 February 2026.

2025–26 Liga 4 Central Papua (also known as the 2025–26 Liga 4 Central Papua Governor's Cup and officially sponsored as the 2025–26 Liga 4 Freeport Indonesia for sponsorship reasons) is the second season of the fourth-tier football competition in Indonesia organized by the Provincial Association (Asprov) of PSSI Central Papua.

The competition serves as the regional qualifying round for Central Papua to determine its representative for the national phase of the 2025–26 Liga 4. The tournament is scheduled to be held in Timika, Mimika Regency, with the opening ceremony on 8 March 2026 and the official kick-off on 9 March 2026.

== Background ==
The Central Papua Asprov PSSI officially opened registration for clubs in February 2026. The competition is held with the support of the provincial government and Freeport Indonesia as the main sponsor. Matches are scheduled to take place at the Wania Imipi Stadium in Timika, Mimika Regency.

== Format ==
The competition will feature clubs from eight regencies across Central Papua. Depending on the final number of registered teams, the Panpel (Organizing Committee) plans to divide the participants into two groups for the group stage. The group winners and runners-up will then advance to a knockout round to determine the champion.

The age regulation for this season follows PSSI's national guidelines:

- Players must be born on or after 1 January 2003 (Maximum age of 23).
- Each team is permitted to register a maximum of seven senior players.

== Venue ==
All matches will be held at a single centralized venue in Timika:

| Stadium | Location | Capacity |
|---|---|---|
| Wania Imipi Stadium | Mimika Regency | 10,000 |

The stadium underwent minor renovations in early 2026 to prepare for the regional competition.

== Teams ==
The 2025–26 Liga 4 Central Papua (Governor's Cup) officially featured seven competing teams, with the registration period concluding in late February 2026. The tournament was centered at the Wania Imipi Stadium in Mimika Regency, which served as the battlefield where these clubs vied for glory. To bolster their identity and ignite the spirit of sportsmanship, each participating team officially unveiled their nicknames before the competition commenced, symbolizing their representative regions' pride and strength.

Locations of teams competing in the 2025–26 Liga 4 Central Papua

| No | Team | Nickname | Location | 2024–25 season^{†} |
|---|---|---|---|---|
| 1 | Persemi | The Golden Boys | Mimika | group stage |
| 2 | Persipani | Koteka Warriors from Wissel Meren | Paniai | did not participate |
| 3 | Persido | Ukaa Mapegaa Warriors | Dogiyai | 3rd place |
| 4 | Persidei | Storm of Mount Deiyai | Deiyai | group stage |
| 5 | Persipuja | Son of Koteka | Puncak Jaya | 4th place |
| 6 | Persintan | Carstensz Storm | Intan Jaya | runners-up |
| 7 | Persipuncak | Eternal Snow of Carstensz | Puncak | champions |

^{†} Results from the 2024–25 Liga 4 Central Papua.

== Sponsorship ==
The 2025–26 season is primarily sponsored by PT Freeport Indonesia (PTFI). The partnership includes financial support for the tournament operations and infrastructure preparation at Wania Imipi Stadium. This sponsorship is part of PTFI's commitment to developing sports talent in the Central Papua province, which also includes the Papua Football Academy (PFA).

== Schedule ==
The tournament schedule was established following the arrival of all participating teams in Timika on 5 March 2026. This was followed by a verification process and a Match Coordination Meeting (MCM) including the group drawing.

The main timeline for the competition is as follows:

- 5 March 2026: Team arrival in Timika
- 6 March 2026: Team verification
- 7 March 2026: Drawing and Match Coordination Meeting (MCM)
- 9 March 2026: Official kick-off

== Group stage ==
The group stage began on 9 March 2026 at the Wania Imipi Stadium, Mimika. The seven teams were divided into two groups, competing in a single round-robin format. The winner and runner-up from each group advanced to the knockout stage.

=== Group A ===
| Pos | Team | Pld | W | D | L | GF | GA | GD | Pts | Qualification |
|---|---|---|---|---|---|---|---|---|---|---|
| 1 | Persido | 3 | 2 | 1 | 0 | 8 | 1 | +7 | 7 | Qualification to Knockout stage |
| 2 | Persemi | 3 | 2 | 0 | 1 | 8 | 2 | +6 | 6 | Qualification to Knockout stage |
| 3 | Persipuja | 3 | 1 | 1 | 1 | 7 | 7 | 0 | 4 | |
| 4 | Persintan | 3 | 0 | 0 | 3 | 4 | 17 | −13 | 0 | |

Updated to match(es) played on unknown. Source:

=== Group B ===
| Pos | Team | Pld | W | D | L | GF | GA | GD | Pts | Qualification |
|---|---|---|---|---|---|---|---|---|---|---|
| 1 | Persipani | 2 | 1 | 1 | 0 | 3 | 0 | +3 | 4 | Qualification to Knockout stage |
| 2 | Persipuncak | 2 | 0 | 2 | 0 | 0 | 0 | 0 | 2 | Qualification to Knockout stage |
| 3 | Persidei | 2 | 0 | 1 | 1 | 0 | 3 | −3 | 1 | |

Updated to match(es) played on unknown. Source:

=== Matchday ===
The 2025–26 Liga 4 Central Papua group stage is held from 9 to 13 March 2026 at Wania Imipi Stadium, Timika. This centralized tournament features seven teams divided into two groups: Group A with Persido Dogiyai, Persipuja Puncak Jaya, Persintan Intan Jaya, and Persemi Mimika, and Group B with Persipuncak Cartenz, Persidei Deiyai, and Persipani Paniai. The competition began with Persidei Deiyai facing Persipuncak Cartenz and will conclude with Persintan Intan Jaya playing Persipuja Puncak Jaya to ensure fair competition conditions for all participants.

Matchday 1 (9 March 2026)

==== Matchday 1 ====
9 March 2026
07.30 (UTC+09:00)

| Persidei | 0–0 | Persipuncak |
|---|---|---|
| | Report |

Wania Imipi Stadium, Mimika
9 March 2026
15.00 (UTC+09:00)

| Persipuja | 0–0 | Persido |
|---|---|---|
| | Report |

Wania Imipi Stadium, Mimika

Matchday 2 (10 March 2026)

==== Matchday 2 ====
10 March 2026
07:30 WIT (UTC+9)

| Persemi | 4–0 | Persintan |
|---|---|---|
| R. Kuman 17'; Michael G. 53'; D.D. Yafet 61'; Maniawas 80' | Report |

Wania Imipi Stadium, Mimika
10 March 2026
15:00 WIT (UTC+9)

| Persipani | 3–0 | Persidei |
|---|---|---|
| H. Sokoy 25'; D. Tabuni 83'; C. Mote 90' | Report |

Wania Imipi Stadium, Mimika

Matchday 3 (11 March 2026)

==== Matchday 3 ====
11 March 2026
07:30 WIT (UTC+9)

| Persido | 6–0 | Persintan |
|---|---|---|
| G.C. Sroyer 17', 24'; E. Kambuaya 65'; T. Rumatrai 82'; Y. Woppi 88'; P. Kambuaya 90+2' | Report |

Wania Imipi Stadium, Mimika
11 March 2026
15:00 WIT (UTC+9)

| Persipuja | 0–3 | Persemi |
|---|---|---|
| | Report | 67' S. Ayomi; 74' A. Lewerissa; 90' D. Aronggear |

Wania Imipi Stadium, Mimika

Matchday 4 (12 March 2026)

==== Matchday 4 ====
12 March 2026
07:30 WIT (UTC+9)

| Persipuncak | 0–0 | Persipani |
|---|---|---|
| | Report |

Wania Imipi Stadium, Mimika
13 March 2026
15:00 WIT (UTC+9) (the match between Persemi and Persido on 12 March was suspended in the 28th minute due to a waterlogged pitch caused by heavy rain. The remaining 62 minutes were resumed on 13 March at 14:30 WIT)

| Persemi | 1–2 | Persido |
|---|---|---|
| M. Kowo 89' | Report | 81' T. Rumatrai; 92' N.M. Tebai |

Wania Imipi Stadium, Mimika

Matchday 5 (13 March 2026)

==== Matchday 5 ====
13 March 2026
07:30 WIT (UTC+9)

| Persintan | 4–7 | Persipuja |
|---|---|---|
| T. Maiseni 7'; M. Maker 41'; E. Agimbau 50'; N. Kayoi 92' | Report | 17', 91' M.C. Wanggai; 37', 67' I. Sayuri; 42' H.A. Yarangga; 76' M.R. Kogoya; 90' K.A. Ohee |

Wania Imipi Stadium, Mimika

== Knockout stage ==
The knockout stage uses a single-match system. In the event of a draw during regulation time, the match proceeds to extra time and, if necessary, a penalty shoot-out to determine the winner. The competition adheres to the U-23 regulation (players born on or after 1 January 2003), with a maximum allowance of seven senior players per team. Four teams from the two groups of Liga 4 Central Papua have officially qualified for the semi-final stage.

=== Bracket ===
Semi-finals
16 March 2026 — Wania Imipi, Mimika
A1 | Persido | 1
B2 | Persipuncak | 2
16 March 2026 — Wania Imipi, Mimika
B1 | Persipani | 1 (4)
A2 | Persemi | 1 (3)

Final
17 March 2026 — Wania Imipi, Mimika
Persipuncak | 0
Persipani | 2
Third place play-off
17 March 2026 — Wania Imipi, Mimika
Persido | 2
Persemi | 1

=== Knockout match ===
Semi-finals – 16 March 2026

==== Semi-final 1 ====
16 March 2026
07:30 WIT (UTC+9)

| Persido | 1–2 | Persipuncak |
|---|---|---|
| T. Rumatrai 10' | Report | 25' K. Ohee; 32' N. Fontaba |

Wania Imipi Stadium, Mimika

==== Semi-final 2 ====
16 March 2026
15:00 WIT (UTC+9)

| Persipani | 1–1 (a.e.t.) | Persemi |
|---|---|---|
| S. Simalya 86' | Report | 85' L.N. Hembring |
Penalties
| M. Deal (penalty missed); M.A. Wayeni (penalty scored); S. Simalya (penalty scored); J.D. Gobay (penalty scored); V. Kenelak (penalty scored) | 4–3 | A. Lewerissa (penalty scored); M. Kowo (penalty missed); J.C. Onna (penalty scored); Y. Buinei (penalty missed); C. Huwae (penalty scored) |

Wania Imipi Stadium, Mimika

3rd place & Final – 17 March 2026

==== Third place play-off ====
17 March 2026
07:30 WIT (UTC+9)

| Persido | 2–1 | Persemi |
|---|---|---|
| D. Doo 23'; T. Rumatrai 86' | Report | 8' L.N. Hembring |

Wania Imipi Stadium, Mimika

==== Final ====
17 March 2026
15:00 WIT (UTC+9)

| Persipuncak | 0–2 | Persipani |
|---|---|---|
| | Report | 46' J. Mambiew; 91' S. Gobai |

Wania Imipi Stadium, Mimika

== See also ==
- 2025–26 Liga 4
- 2025–26 Liga 4 Papua
- 2025–26 Liga 4 Highland Papua
- 2025–26 Liga 4 South Papua
- 2025–26 Liga 4 Southwest Papua
- 2025–26 Liga 4 West Papua
