= 2024–25 Liga 4 Central Papua =

Liga 4 Central Papua
- Season: 2024–25
- Dates: 10–17 April 2025
- Champions: Persipuncak (1st title)
- National phase: Persipuncak
- Matches: 13
- Goals: 30 (2.31 per match)
- Biggest win: Persipuja 3–1 Persidei (10 April 2025)
- Highest scoring: Persipuja 3–1 Persidei (10 April 2025)

The 2024–25 Liga 4 Central Papua was the inaugural season of Liga 4 Central Papua after the structural changes of Indonesian football competition and serves as a qualifying round for the national phase of the 2024–25 Liga 4. The competition will be organised by the Central Papua Provincial PSSI Association.

== Teams ==
=== Teams changes ===
The following teams changed division after the 2023–24 season.

▲ Qualified for Liga Nusantara
- Waanal Brothers
- Persipani

=== Participating teams ===
A total of 7 teams are competing in this season.

No	Team	Location	2023 season^{†}
1	Persinab	Nabire Regency	4th place
2	Persintan	Intan Jaya Regency	—
3	Persipuncak	Puncak Regency	—
4	Persipuja	Puncak Jaya Regency	—
5	Persido Dogiyai	Dogiyai Regency	2nd place
6	Persidei	Deiyai Regency	—
7	Persemi	Mimika Regency	9th place

Notes:

- ^{†}In the 2023 season, despite the split into four provinces, teams from all except South Papua still competed in Liga 3 Papua.

=== Personnel and kits ===
Note: Flags indicate national team as has been defined under FIFA eligibility rules. Players and coaches may hold more than one non-FIFA nationality.

Team	Head coach	Captain	Kit manufacturer	Main kit sponsor	Other kit sponsor(s)
Persemi				The Golden Boys	List: Front: Back: Sleeves: Shorts:
Persidei			(Indonesia) Made by club	Enaimoo Ekowai Deiyai	List: Front: Back: Sleeves: Shorts:
Persido Dogiyai			(Indonesia) Made by club	Persido	List: Front: Back: Sleeves: Shorts:
Persinab				Persinab	List: Front: Back: Sleeves: Shorts:
Persintan			(Indonesia) SLEMN24	Intan Jaya Regency Government	List: Front: Intan Jaya Regency; Back: Sleeves: H30; Shorts:
Persipuja			(Indonesia) Made by club	None	List: Front: None; Back: None; Sleeves: None; Shorts: None
Persipuncak			(Indonesia) Made by club	Carstensz	List: Front: Puncak Regency Government; Back: Sleeves: Shorts:

== Schedule ==
The schedule of the competition is as follows.

Stage	Matchday	Date	
Stage	Matchday	Group A	Group B
Group stage	Matchday 1	10–11 April 2025	10 April 2025
Group stage	Matchday 2	12 April 2025	11 April 2025
Group stage	Matchday 3	14 April 2025	13 April 2025
Knockout stage	Semi-finals	16 April 2025	
Knockout stage	Third place play-off	17 April 2025	
Knockout stage	Final	17 April 2025	

== Group stage ==
A total of 7 teams were drawn into two groups. The group stage will be played in a home tournament format of single round-robin matches.

The top two teams of each group will qualify for the knockout stage.

=== Group A ===
All matches will be held at Wania Imipi Stadium, Mimika.

Pos	Team	Pld	W	D	L	GF	GA	GD	Pts	Qualification	PCK	PDO	NAB	PMI
1	Persipuncak	3	1	2	0	3	2	+1	5	Qualification to the knockout stage		1–1		
2	Persido	3	0	3	0	2	2	0	3	Qualification to the knockout stage			0–0	1–1
3	Persinab	3	0	3	0	2	2	0	3		1–1			
4	Persemi (H)	3	0	2	1	2	3	−1	2		0–1		1–1	

Source: Liga 4 Central Papua
Rules for classification: 1) Points; 2) Head-to-head points; 3) Head-to-head goal difference; 4) Head-to-head goals scored; 5) Goal difference; 6) Goals scored; 7) Fair-play points; 8) Draw.
(H) Hosts

Group A matches

Matchday 1 (10–11 April 2025)
10 April 2025
15:00 UTC+9

Persido	0–0	Persinab
	Report

Wania Imipi Stadium, Mimika
11 April 2025
07:00 UTC+9

Persemi	0–1	Persipuncak
	Report

Wania Imipi Stadium, Mimika

Matchday 2 (12 April 2025)
12 April 2025
07:00 UTC+9

Persinab	1–1	Persipuncak
	Report

Wania Imipi Stadium, Mimika
12 April 2025
15:00 UTC+9

Persido	1–1	Persemi
	Report

Wania Imipi Stadium, Mimika

Matchday 3 (14 April 2025)
14 April 2025
07:00 UTC+9

Persemi	1–1	Persinab
	Report

Wania Imipi Stadium, Mimika
14 April 2025
15:00 UTC+9

Persipuncak	1–1	Persido
	Report

Wania Imipi Stadium, Mimika

=== Group B ===
All matches will be held at Wania Imipi Stadium, Mimika.

Pos	Team	Pld	W	D	L	GF	GA	GD	Pts	Qualification	INT	PJA	PDE
1	Persintan	2	2	0	0	4	2	+2	6	Qualification to the knockout stage		2–1	
2	Persipuja	2	1	0	1	4	3	+1	3	Qualification to the knockout stage			3–1
3	Persidei	2	0	0	2	2	5	−3	0		1–2		

Source: Liga 4 Central Papua
Rules for classification: 1) Points; 2) Head-to-head points; 3) Head-to-head goal difference; 4) Head-to-head goals scored; 5) Goal difference; 6) Goals scored; 7) Fair-play points; 8) Draw.

Group B matches

Matchday 1 (10 April 2025)
10 April 2025
07:00 UTC+9

Persipuja	3–1	Persidei
	Report

Wania Imipi Stadium, Mimika

Matchday 2 (11 April 2025)
11 April 2025
15:00 UTC+9

Persintan	2–1	Persipuja
	Report

Wania Imipi Stadium, Mimika

Matchday 3 (13 April 2025)
13 April 2025
15:00 UTC+9

Persidei	1–2	Persintan
	Report

Wania Imipi Stadium, Mimika

== Knockout stage ==
The knockout stage will be played as a single match. If tied after regulation time, extra time and, if necessary, a penalty shoot-out will be used to decide the winning team.

=== Bracket ===
Semi-finals
16 April — Mimika
A1	Persipuncak	2
B2	Persipuja	1
16 April — Mimika
B1	Persintan	1
A2	Persido	0

Final
April — Mimika
Persipuncak (p)	1 (3)
Persintan	1 (1)
Third place play-off
April — Mimika
Persipuja	2
Persido	3

=== Semi-finals ===
16 April 2025
07:00 UTC+9

Persipuncak	2–1	Persipuja
	Report

Wania Imipi Stadium, Mimika

16 April 2025
15:00 UTC+9

Persintan	1–0	Persido
	Report

Wania Imipi Stadium, Mimika

=== Third place play-off ===
17 April 2025
07:00 UTC+9

Persipuja	2–3	Persido
	Report

Wania Imipi Stadium, Mimika

=== Final ===
The winner will qualify to the national phase and will be placed in Group F.

17 April 2025
15:00 UTC+9

Persipuncak	1–1 (a.e.t.)	Persintan
	Report
Penalties
	3–1

Wania Imipi Stadium, Mimika

== See also ==
- 2024–25 Liga 4
- 2024–25 Liga 4 Southwest Papua
- 2024–25 Liga 4 South Papua
- 2024–25 Liga 4 Highland Papua
- 2024–25 Liga 4 West Papua
