= Sokoy =

Sokoy is a Papuan surname. Notable people with the surname include:

- Erik Sokoy (born 1994), Indonesian professional footballer
- Frank Sokoy (born 1997), Indonesian professional footballer
