= Wania Imipi Stadium =

Football stadium in Timika, Indonesia

- Location in Central Papua Wania Imipi Stadium (Indonesia)
- Location: Timika, Mimika Regency, Central Papua, Indonesia
- Coordinates: 4.549°S 136.887°E
- Owner: Mimika Regency Government
- Operator: Mimika Regency Government
- Capacity: 10,000
- Surface: Grass

Construction
- Renovated: 2022

Tenants
- Persemi Mimika; Waanal Brothers

Wania Imipi Stadium is a football stadium located in Timika, Mimika Regency, Central Papua, Indonesia. The stadium has a seating capacity of approximately 10,000 spectators and serves as the home ground of Persemi Mimika and Waanal Brothers.

The stadium is one of the main football venues in Central Papua and has been used for regional football competitions, including provincial tournaments and the Liga 4 provincial qualifiers.

== History ==
Wania Imipi Stadium is owned and operated by the Mimika Regency Government. In 2022, the stadium underwent renovation funded by the local government with a budget of around Rp 4.5 billion to improve the playing field and supporting facilities.

Following the renovation, the stadium was inspected by a risk assessment team to evaluate its readiness for hosting football competitions, including Liga 4 matches in the Central Papua zone.

== Events ==
The stadium has hosted several regional football tournaments and competitions. In the 2025–26 season, Wania Imipi Stadium was selected as the venue for the opening ceremony of the Liga 4 Central Papua provincial competition.
