= Yosepha Alomang =

Indonesian environmentalist

- Born: c. 1940s Tsinga, Papua, Indonesia
- Other names: Mama Yosepha
- Occupations: human rights defender and environmental activist
- Children: 6
- Awards: Yap Thiam Hien Award (1999); Goldman Environmental Prize (2001)

Yosepha Alomang (born c. 1940s), also known as Mama Yosepha, is an Amungin Indonesian indigenous human rights defender and environmental activist. She has been awarded the Yap Thiam Hien Award and Goldman Environmental Prize.

== Early life and family ==
Alomang was born in the 1940s, in Tsinga, Papua, Indonesia and is of the Amung people. The province of Papua, is one of the most biologically diverse places on the planet. During her childhood, Alomang moved around, along with other villagers, because of orders from the colonial Dutch government and then the Indonesian government.

Alomang married Markus Kwalik in the 1970s and they had 6 children. When her husband failed to pay her dowry according to customary law, Yosepha herself tried hard to save and pay it, to avoid her family's anger.

In 1977, hundreds of Amungme people cut American gold mining company Freeport-McMoRan's pipeline, because the company was considered to have seized land belonging to the Amungme people. A military operation was carried out in retaliation and Alomang fled with her family from the Tsinga Valley into the forest to hide. In the forest her three year old daughter Johanna died of starvation.

== Activism ==
In 1991, Alomang led a three-day occupation and demonstration at Timika Airport against Freeport-McMoRan and the Indonesian government's refusal to listen to local people's concerns. She was accused of helping Free Papua Movement fighter, Kelly Kwalik.

Due to her activism, she was arrested and tortured by Indonesia’s state security forces in 1994. She was locked in a shipping container for days in high heat and with little food or water. She was also prevented from leaving Indonesia in 1998 when she wanted to attend a shareholders meeting in London, England.

In 1996, Alomang launched a civil lawsuit in the United States against Freeport-McMoRan, suing for compensation for both personal injury and environmental damages. Her litigation attracted the support of international environmental and human rights NGOs working with mining affected communities.

In 2003, after a landslide and pit collapse at the Freeport's Grasberg mine killed 8 workers, which was found to be as a result of negligence, Alomang called on Freeport-McMoRan to leave Papua, accusing the company of causing the accident and massive environmental damage.

Alomang also campaigned for the distribution of alcohol to be made illegal in Timika.

== Awards ==
Alomang was awarded the Yap Thiam Hien Award in 1999. She established YAHAMAK, the Foundation Against Violence and for Human Rights, using money from the prize.

She was awarded the Goldman Environmental Prize (also known as the Green Nobel) in 2001, for her efforts on organizing her community to resist Freeport-McMoRan's practices over three decades that had destroyed rainforests, polluted rivers, and displaced communities. The American gold mining company offered to award her $250,000 for receiving the Prize, but she refused their money.

Alomang's life story has been published in a book entitled Pergulatan seorang Perempuan Papua Melawa.
