= Donny Monim =

Indonesian footballer

Personal information
- Full name: Donny Haroid Monim
- Date of birth: 3 May 1995 (age 31)
- Place of birth: Yapen, Indonesia
- Height: 6 ft 1 in (1.85 m)
- Position: Centre-back

Team information
- Current team: Persinab Nabire
- Number: 93

Senior career*
Years	Team	Apps	(Gls)
2015–2019	Perseru Serui	38	(1)
2017	→ Persipuncak Puncak (loan)		
2019–2020	Barito Putera	29	(1)
2020–2022	Persipura Jayapura	24	(0)
2022–2023	Barito Putera	10	(0)
2023	Bhayangkara	3	(0)
2023–2024	Malut United	8	(0)
2024	PSBS Biak	4	(0)
2025	PSPS Pekanbaru	4	(0)
2025–	Persinab Nabire	8	(0)
- * Club domestic league appearances and goals as of 11 January 2026

Donny Haroid Monim (born 3 May 1995) is an Indonesian professional footballer who plays as a centre-back for Liga Nusantara club Persinab Nabire.

== Club career ==
=== Persipuncak Puncak ===
Donny played for Persipuncak Puncak in the 2017 Liga 3 Papua zone, he was on the same club as Frank Sokoy and Frengky Kogoya who were then coached by Johanes Songgonau.

=== Barito Putera ===
In 2019, Donny Monim signed a contract with Indonesian Liga 1 club Barito Putera. Monim made his debut on 20 May 2019 in a match against Persija Jakarta. On 22 October 2019, Monim scored his first goal for Barito Putera against PSIS Semarang in the 23rd minute at the Demang Lehman Stadium, Martapura.

=== Persipura Jayapura ===
He was signed for Persipura Jayapura to play in Liga 1 in the 2020 season. This season was suspended on 27 March 2020 due to the COVID-19 pandemic. The season was abandoned and was declared void on 20 January 2021.

=== Return to Barito Putera ===
Monim was signed for Barito Putera to play in Liga 1 in the 2022–23 season. He made his league debut on 23 July 2022 in a match against Madura United at the Gelora Ratu Pamelingan Stadium, Pamekasan.

=== Bhayangkara ===
On 29 January 2023, Monim signed a contract with Liga 1 club Bhayangkara from Barito Putera. Monim made his league debut for the club in a 3–2 win against Persikabo 1973, coming on as a substituted Aji Joko Sutopo.

== Career statistics ==
=== Club ===
As of match played 11 January 2026

Club	Season	League			Cup (Note: Includes Piala Indonesia)		Continental		Other		Total	
Club	Season	Division	Apps	Goals	Apps	Goals	Apps	Goals	Apps	Goals	Apps	Goals
Perseru Serui	2018	Liga 1	31	1	2	1	–		0	0	33	2
Barito Putera	2019	Liga 1	29	1	0	0	–		0	0	29	1
Persipura Jayapura	2020	Liga 1	2	0	0	0	–		0	0	2	0
Persipura Jayapura	2021–22	Liga 1	22	0	0	0	–		0	0	22	0
Persipura Jayapura	Total		24	0	0	0	–		0	0	24	0
Barito Putera	2022–23	Liga 1	10	0	0	0	–		4 (Note: Appearances in Indonesia President's Cup)	0	14	0
Bhayangkara	2022–23	Liga 1	3	0	0	0	–		0	0	3	0
Maluku Utara United	2023–24	Liga 2	8	0	0	0	–		0	0	8	0
PSBS Biak	2024–25	Liga 1	4	0	0	0	–		0	0	4	0
PSPS Pekanbaru	2024–25	Liga 2	4	0	0	0	–		0	0	4	0
Persinab Nabire	2025–26	Liga Nusantara	8	0	0	0	–		0	0	8	0
Career total			121	2	2	1	–		4	0	127	3

== Honours ==
Malut United

- Liga 2 third place (play-offs): 2023–24
