= Hendra Mole =

Indonesian footballer

Personal information
- Full name: Hendra Mole
- Date of birth: 11 April 1995 (age 31)
- Place of birth: West Halmahera, Indonesia
- Height: 1.81 m (5 ft 11 in)
- Position: Goalkeeper

Team information
- Current team: Sriwijaya
- Number: 34

Youth career
- 2012: Persinab Nabire
- 2013–2014: Perseru Serui

Senior career*
| Years | Team | Apps | (Gls) |
| 2014–2018 | Perseru Serui | 16 | (0) |
| 2019 | Sriwijaya | 4 | (0) |
| 2020 | PSS Sleman | 0 | (0) |
| 2021 | Sriwijaya | 1 | (0) |
| 2022 | Bekasi City | 0 | (0) |
| 2023–2024 | Malut United | 0 | (0) |
| 2024– | Sriwijaya | 8 | (0) |
- * Club domestic league appearances and goals as of 30 January 2025

Hendra Mole (born 11 April 1995) is an Indonesian professional footballer who plays as a goalkeeper for Liga 2 club Sriwijaya.

== Club career ==
=== Sriwijaya ===
In 2019, Hendra Mole signed a one-year contract with Indonesian Liga 2 club Sriwijaya.

=== PSS Sleman ===
He was signed for PSS Sleman to play in Liga 1 in the 2020 season. This season was suspended on 27 March 2020 due to the COVID-19 pandemic. The season was abandoned and was declared void on 20 January 2021.

=== Return to Sriwijaya ===
In 2021, it was confirmed that Mole would re-join Sriwijaya, signing a year contract. He made his league debut on 30 November 2021 against PSMS Medan at the Kaharudin Nasution Rumbai Stadium, Pekanbaru.

== Honours ==
Malut United

- Liga 2 third place (play-offs): 2023–24
