= Kogoya =

Kogoya is a surname. Notable people with the surname include:

- Egianus Kogoya (born 1999), commander in the Free Papua Movement
- Frengky Kogoya (born 1997), Indonesian professional footballer
- Yamin Kogoya (born 1978), Papuan philosopher, writer and independent researcher
