= Amamapare =

Port in Mimika Regency, Papua, Indonesia

Port of Amamapare
- Interactive map of Port of Amamapare
- Location within Western New Guinea
- Native name: Pelabuhan Amamapare (Indonesian)

Location
- Country: Indonesia
- Location: Mimika Regency, Central Papua
- Coordinates: 4°53′S 136°48′E

Amamapare is a port and industrial centre in Mimika Regency, Central Papua, Indonesia; National Geographic refers to it as a port town. Slurry containing copper-gold concentrate is delivered by three pipelines from Grasberg mine over 70 miles away. In Amamapare it is dewatered, filtered, and dried and then shipped to smelters around the world. There is a coal-fired power station at the port which supplies the Grasberg operations.

== Climate ==
Amamapare has a tropical rainforest climate (Af) with heavy to very heavy rainfall year-round.

Climate data for Amamapare
Month	Jan	Feb	Mar	Apr	May	Jun	Jul	Aug	Sep	Oct	Nov	Dec	Year
Mean daily maximum °C (°F)	31.5 (88.7)	31.5 (88.7)	31.5 (88.7)	31.1 (88.0)	30.6 (87.1)	29.1 (84.4)	28.1 (82.6)	28.3 (82.9)	29.1 (84.4)	30.1 (86.2)	31.4 (88.5)	31.5 (88.7)	30.3 (86.6)
Daily mean °C (°F)	27.0 (80.6)	26.9 (80.4)	27.0 (80.6)	26.7 (80.1)	26.4 (79.5)	25.4 (77.7)	24.5 (76.1)	24.8 (76.6)	25.2 (77.4)	26.1 (79.0)	26.9 (80.4)	26.9 (80.4)	26.1 (79.1)
Mean daily minimum °C (°F)	22.5 (72.5)	22.3 (72.1)	22.5 (72.5)	22.4 (72.3)	22.3 (72.1)	21.7 (71.1)	21.0 (69.8)	21.4 (70.5)	21.4 (70.5)	22.1 (71.8)	22.4 (72.3)	22.4 (72.3)	22.0 (71.6)
Average precipitation mm (inches)	235 (9.3)	238 (9.4)	273 (10.7)	297 (11.7)	317 (12.5)	351 (13.8)	410 (16.1)	390 (15.4)	261 (10.3)	185 (7.3)	157 (6.2)	212 (8.3)	3,326 (131)
Source: Climate-Data.org
