= Tsinga =

- Village
- Location of the village in Central Papua Location of the village in Western New Guinea
- Coordinates: 4°12′46″S 137°10′56″E
- Country: Indonesia
- Province: Central Papua
- Regency: Mimika Regency
- District: Tembagapura
- Elevation: 1,400 m (4,600 ft)

Population (2006)
  - Total: 71,838
- Time zone: UTC+9 (WIT)
- Climate: Cfb

Tsinga or Singa is a village in Indonesia located in Tembagapura District, Mimika Regency, Central Papua.

== Geography ==
Tsinga is found in the east of Indonesia on the island of New Guinea, in the kabupaten of Mimika Regency in Central Papua Province. It is located on the Sudirman Range of the Maoke Mountains, in the valley of the river Nasura, just before its confluence with the river Tsing.

The village is used by climbers who are heading for Puncak Jaya, the highest point of these mountains, of Indonesia, of Oceania and one of the seven summits, which are found within 12 kilometres as the crow flies northwards.

== Demographics ==
The village is inhabited by the Amungme and Nduga, who migrated here in the 1940s.
