= Yap Thiam Hien Award =

Human rights award in Indonesia

Penghargaan Yap Thiam Hien (Yap Thiam Hien Award) is an award given by Yayasan Pusat Studi Hak Asasi Manusia to people with contributions in human rights issues in Indonesia. The name is based on an Indonesian Chinese lawyer and a human right activist Yap Thiam Hien. The award is usually given every 10 December since 1992. However, due to lack of funding, the foundation stopped giving out the award in 2005.

== Winners ==
1. 1992 — Haji Muhidin, Jhony Simanjuntak dan H.J.C. Princen
2. 1993 — Marsinah
3. 1994 — Trimoelja D. Soerjadi
4. 1995 — Jenggawah dan Ade Rostina Sitompul
5. 1996 — Sandyawan Sumardi S.J
6. 1997 — (No award)
7. 1998 — Kontras dan Farida Hariyani
8. 1999 — Sarah Lery Mboeik and Mama Yosepha Alomang
9. 2000 — The Urban Poor Consortium
10. 2001 — Suraiya Kamaruzaman and Ester Jusuf Purba
11. 2002 — Widji Thukul
12. 2003 — Maria Margaretha Hartiningsih
13. 2004 — Maria Catarina Sumarsih
14. 2005 — (No award)
15. 2006 — (No award)
16. 2007 — (No award)
17. 2008 — Siti Musdah Mulia
18. 2009 — Yohanes Jonga
19. 2010 — Asmara Nababan
20. 2011 — Soetandyo Wignjosoebroto
21. 2012 — Majalah Tempo
22. 2014 — Anis Hidayah
23. 2015 — Handoko Wibowo
24. 2016 — Aleta Baun
25. 2017 — Ahmad Mustofa Bisri, known as Gus Mus
26. 2018 — Eva Bande and a local group from Central Java, Sedulur Sikep
