= Kuala Kencana =

District in Mimika Regency, Papua Province, Indonesia

Coordinates: 4.399°S 136.862°E

Kuala Kencana District Distrik Kuala Kencana
- District
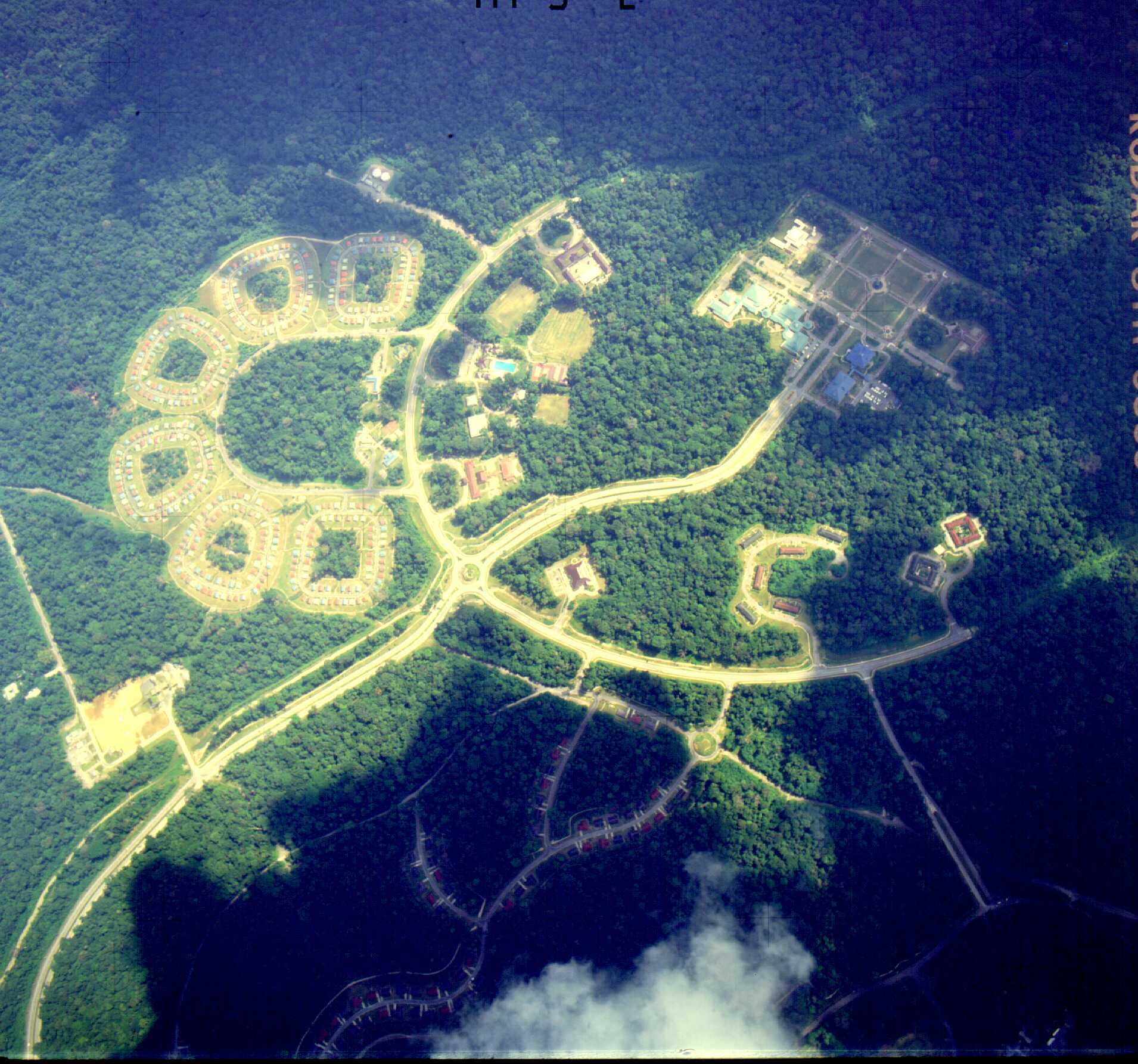
- Aerial view of Kuala Kencana
- Interactive map of Kuala Kencana District
- Country: Indonesia
- Province: Central Papua
- Regency: Mimika Regency

Population (2020)
  - Total: 27,774
- Time zone: UTC+9 (IEST)

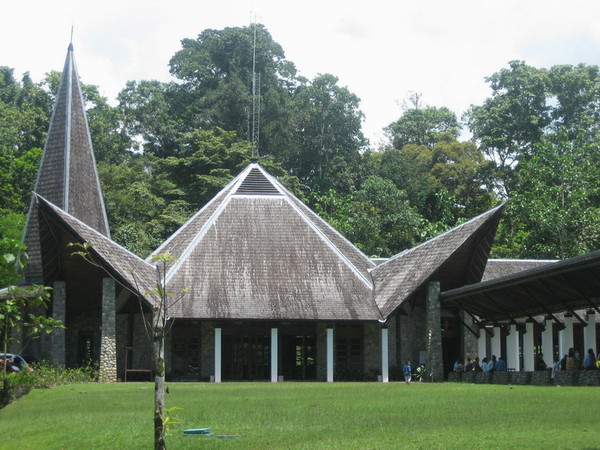
A church in Kuala Kencana

Kuala Kencana lit. 'golden estuary' is a district in Mimika Regency, Central Papua, Indonesia. It is the purpose-built company town, managed by Indonesian mineral extraction company PT Freeport Indonesia. The new town was inaugurated by Indonesian President Suharto in 1995. The district covers an area of 860.74 km^{2} and had a population of 18,290 at the 2010 Census and 27,774 at the 2020 Census.

The town features running water and other modern amenities previously rarely seen in Papua, though critics note this has come at a cost of dispossession of indigenous populations and environmental damage.

== Climate ==
Kuala Kencana has a tropical rainforest climate (Af) with heavy to very heavy rainfall year-round.

Climate data for Kuala Kencana
Month	Jan	Feb	Mar	Apr	May	Jun	Jul	Aug	Sep	Oct	Nov	Dec	Year
Mean daily maximum °C (°F)	31.1 (88.0)	31.0 (87.8)	31.0 (87.8)	30.6 (87.1)	30.1 (86.2)	28.7 (83.7)	27.8 (82.0)	28.0 (82.4)	28.7 (83.7)	29.6 (85.3)	30.7 (87.3)	31.0 (87.8)	29.9 (85.8)
Daily mean °C (°F)	26.5 (79.7)	26.4 (79.5)	26.4 (79.5)	26.2 (79.2)	26.0 (78.8)	24.9 (76.8)	24.3 (75.7)	24.5 (76.1)	24.9 (76.8)	25.6 (78.1)	26.2 (79.2)	26.4 (79.5)	25.7 (78.2)
Mean daily minimum °C (°F)	21.9 (71.4)	21.8 (71.2)	21.9 (71.4)	21.9 (71.4)	21.9 (71.4)	21.2 (70.2)	20.8 (69.4)	21.0 (69.8)	21.1 (70.0)	21.6 (70.9)	21.8 (71.2)	21.9 (71.4)	21.6 (70.8)
Average rainfall mm (inches)	248 (9.8)	255 (10.0)	285 (11.2)	291 (11.5)	308 (12.1)	343 (13.5)	397 (15.6)	385 (15.2)	265 (10.4)	194 (7.6)	170 (6.7)	217 (8.5)	3,358 (132.1)
Source: Climate-Data.org

== See also ==
- Tembagapura, another district and company town built by Freeport-McMoran in Mimika.
