= Grasberg mine =

Mine in Central Papua, Indonesia

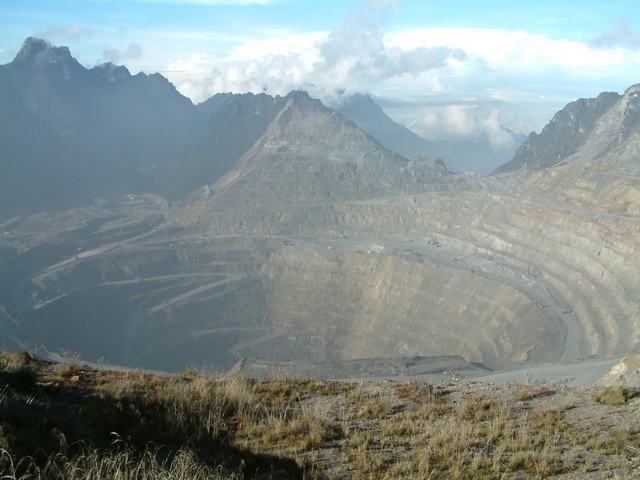
- Grasberg mine open pit, 2007

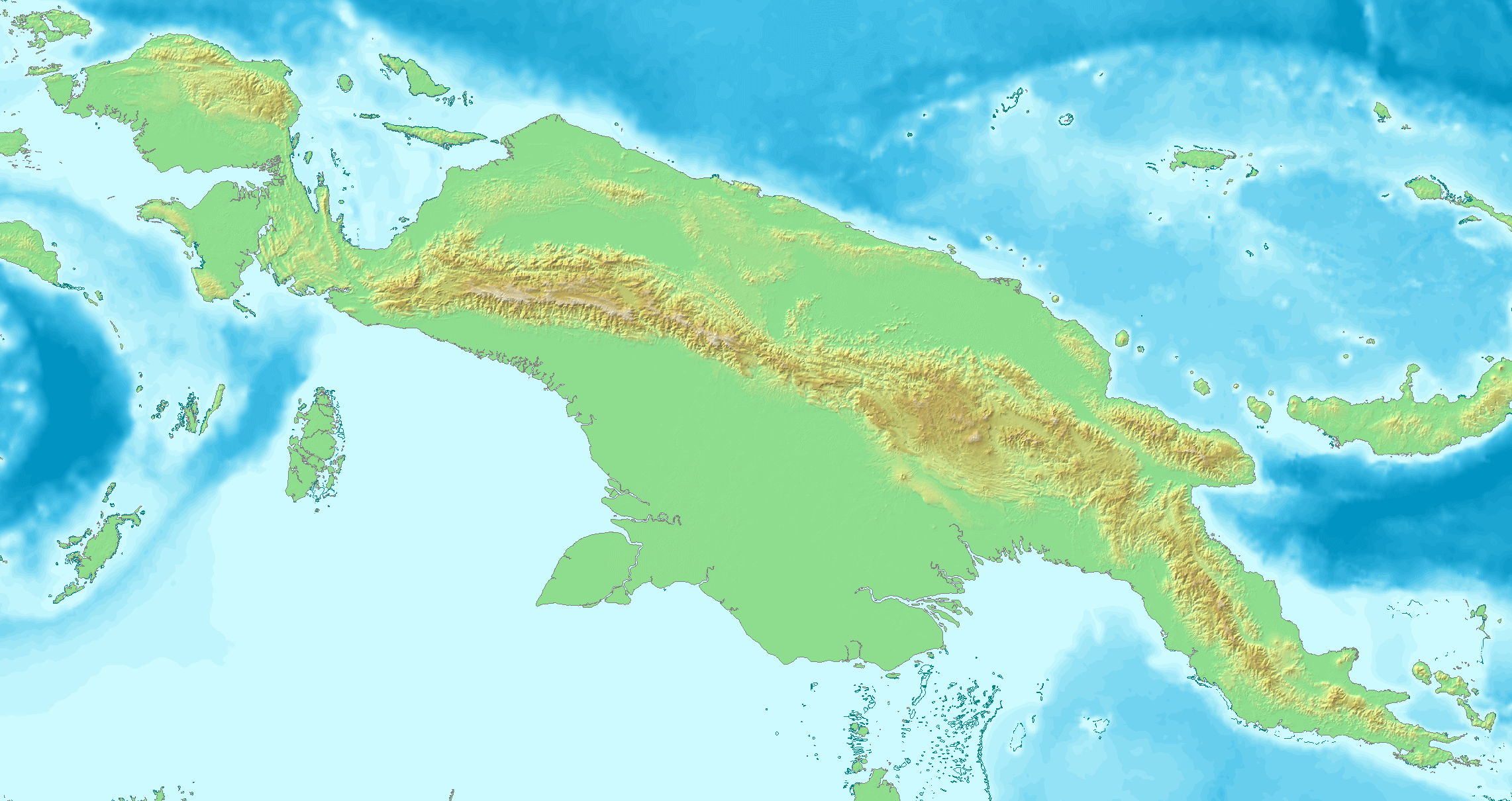
- Location in Central Papua Location in Indonesia Location in New Guinea
- Location: Mimika Regency, Central Papua, Indonesia; 4°3′10″S 137°6′57″E
- Products: Copper; Gold; Silver
- Production: 1.5 billion pounds copper; 1.7 million ounces gold; 6 million ounces silver
- Financial year: 2023
- Opened: 1972
- Company: PT Freeport Indonesia

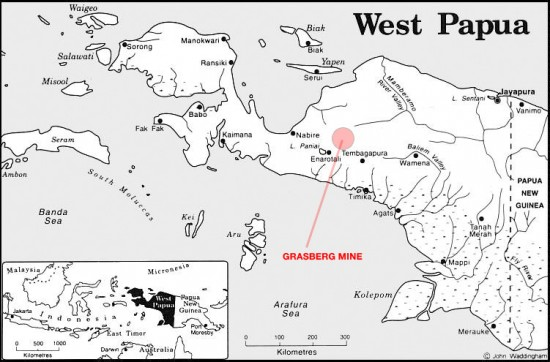
Grasberg Mine location map

The Grasberg mine has one of the largest reserves of gold and copper in the world. It is located in Mimika Regency, Central Papua, Indonesia near Puncak Jaya. It is operated by PT Freeport Indonesia (PTFI, see below), a joint venture among the government of Indonesia, government of Central Papua, and American company Freeport-McMoRan (FCX).

FCX operates under a Contract of Work (CoW) agreement with the government of Indonesia, which allows Freeport to conduct exploration, mining and production activities in a 11,100-hectare (27,400-acre) area (Block A). It also conducts exploration activities in a 167,000 ha (413,000 acres) area (Block B). At 31 December 2022 Grasberg had proven and probable mineral reserves of 30.8 billion pounds (14.0 million tonnes) of copper, 26.3 million ounces (808 tonnes) of gold and 121.3 million ounces (3773 tonnes) of silver. Grasberg has three underground mining operations: Grasberg Block Cave, Deep Mill Level Zone and Big Gossan. The 2023 production was 680,000 tonnes (1,500,000,000 lb) of copper, 52.9 tonnes (1,700,000 ozt) of gold and 190 tonnes (6,000,000 ozt) of silver. The concentrate is delivered by pipeline to Amamapare.

In August 2017, FCX announced that it will divest its ownership in PTFI so that Indonesia owns 51%. In return the CoW will be replaced by a special license (IUPK) with mining rights to 2041 and FCX will build a new smelter by 2022.

== History ==
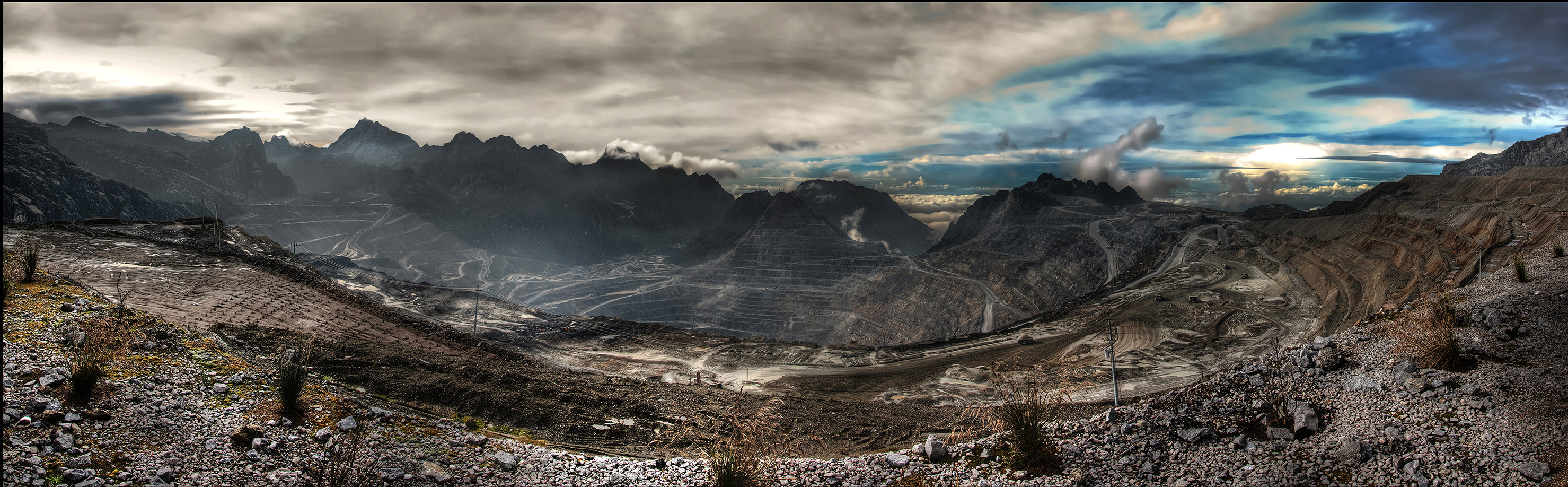
Panorama of the mine, 2009

In 1936, Dutch geologist Jean Jacques Dozy was a member of an expedition that scaled Mount Carstensz (now called Puncak Jaya), the highest mountain in the Dutch East Indies. While there, he made notes of a peculiar black rock with greenish coloring, and spent several weeks estimating the extent of the gold and copper deposits in the area. In 1939, he filed a report about the Ertsberg (Dutch for "ore mountain"). He was working for Nederlandsche Nieuw Guinea Petroleum Maatschappij (NNGPM), an exploration company formed in 1935 by Bataafse Petroleum Maatschappij (BPM, a Royal Dutch Shell subsidiary) (40%), Standard Vacuum Oil Company (40%) and Far Pacific investments (a Standard Oil of California subsidiary) (20%).

Dozy's Ertsberg report came to light again in 1959 when Jan van Gruisen, managing director of the Dutch company Oost Borneo Maatschappij N.V, or East Borneo Company, searched for geological studies on nickel deposits in Western New Guinea. Although the Dozy report did not mention nickel, Van Gruisen applied to the Netherlands government for an exploration concession for an area of 100 square miles (300 km^{2}) surrounding Ertsberg. In March 1959, the New York Times published an article revealing the Dutch were searching for the mountain source of alluvial gold that had been washed into the Arafura Sea. Van Gruisen casually mentioned the Dozy report to Forbes Wilson, geologist and vice president of Freeport Minerals Co., who immediately recognized the mining potential of Ertsberg. Wilson convinced Freeport to back an expedition to explore the Ertsberg site, and in 1960 led an exploration party on an arduous, 6 week long trek to Ertsberg that confirmed the presence of an immense amount of copper mineralization. The directors of Freeport Sulphur at the time included Godfrey Rockefeller, Texaco chairman Augustus Long, George Mealey, and Robert Lovett.

In 1963 the administration of Dutch New Guinea was transferred to Indonesia, and the mine was the first under the new Suharto administration's 1967 foreign investment laws intended to attract foreign investment to Indonesia's then ruined economy. Built at 4,100 metres (14,000 ft) above sea level in one of Papua's most remote areas, it involved a capital and technology input well beyond Indonesia's resources at the time. Construction cost was $175 million, $55 million above the original budget. A 116 km road and pipeline, port, airstrip, power plant and a new town called Tembagapura (literally: copper town) were built. It officially opened in 1973 (although the first ore shipment was in December 1972), and was expanded by Ertsberg East, which opened in 1981. Steep aerial tramways are used to transport equipment and people. Ore is dropped 600 metres (2,000 ft) from the mine, concentrated and mixed with water to form a 60:40 slurry. The slurry is then pumped through a 166 km pipeline through mountains, jungle and swamp to the port at Amamapare, dried and shipped.

In 1977 the rebel group Free Papua Movement attacked the mine. The group dynamited the main slurry pipe, which caused tens of millions of dollars in damage, and attacked the mine facilities. The Indonesian military reacted harshly, killing at least 800 people.

By the mid-1980s, the original mine had been largely depleted. Freeport explored for other deposits in the area. In 1988, Freeport identified reserves valued at $40 billion at Grasberg (Dutch, "Grass Mountain"), 3 kilometres (2 miles) from the Ertsberg mine. The construction of the winding road to Grasberg, the H.E.A.T. (Heavy Equipment Access Trail), was estimated to cost $12 million to $15 million to build. An Indonesian road-builder, Ilyas Hamid, who had contributed to the Ertsberg road took a bulldozer and drove it downhill tracing the path. The road cost just $2 million when completed.

The 2003–2006 boom in copper prices increased the profitability of the mine. The extra consumption of copper for Asian electrical infrastructure overwhelmed copper supply and caused prices to increase from around $1500/ton to $8100/ton ($0.70/lb to $4.00/lb).

In 2005, the New York Times reported that between 1998 and 2004 Freeport had given senior military and police officers and military units nearly $20 million.

== Company ==
PT Freeport Indonesia
- Type: Perseroan terbatas
- Industry: Mining
- Founded: April 7, 1967; 59 years ago
- Headquarters: Plaza 89, South Jakarta, Jakarta, Indonesia
- Products: Concentrate (copper, gold, silver)
- Owner: Government of Indonesia (51.23%); PT Mineral Industri Indonesia (Persero) (41.23%); PT Indonesia Papua Metal & Mineral (10%); Freeport-McMoRan (48.77%)
- Website: www.ptfi.co.id

PT Freeport Indonesia (PTFI) is the company that currently manages Grasberg mine. The mining company is a joint venture between Indonesian and American interests, with the Indonesian government through its state-owned company PT Mineral Industri Indonesia (MIND ID) and PT Indonesia Papua Metal & Mineral, a company co-owned by MIND ID and government of Papua, owning a 51.23% stake and Freeport-McMoRan owning 48.77%.

PT Freeport Indonesia was previously 90.64% owned by Freeport-McMoRan, including 9.36% owned through its wholly owned subsidiary, PT Indocopper Investama.

Since 2018 in negotiation on extending the permit of the mining operation the government of Indonesia negotiated ownership of 51.23% of the company, while Freeport-McMoRan owned 48.77%. PT Indocopper Investama also changed its name to PT Indonesia Papua Metal & Mineral. This ownership transfer deprived Freeport-McMoRan the title of being the largest copper mining company and made Chilean state-owned Codelco retain that title.

Indonesia also agreed to extend the Freeport-McMoRan mining lease, which would have expired in 2021, for a further 20 years until 2041.

== Mine workings ==
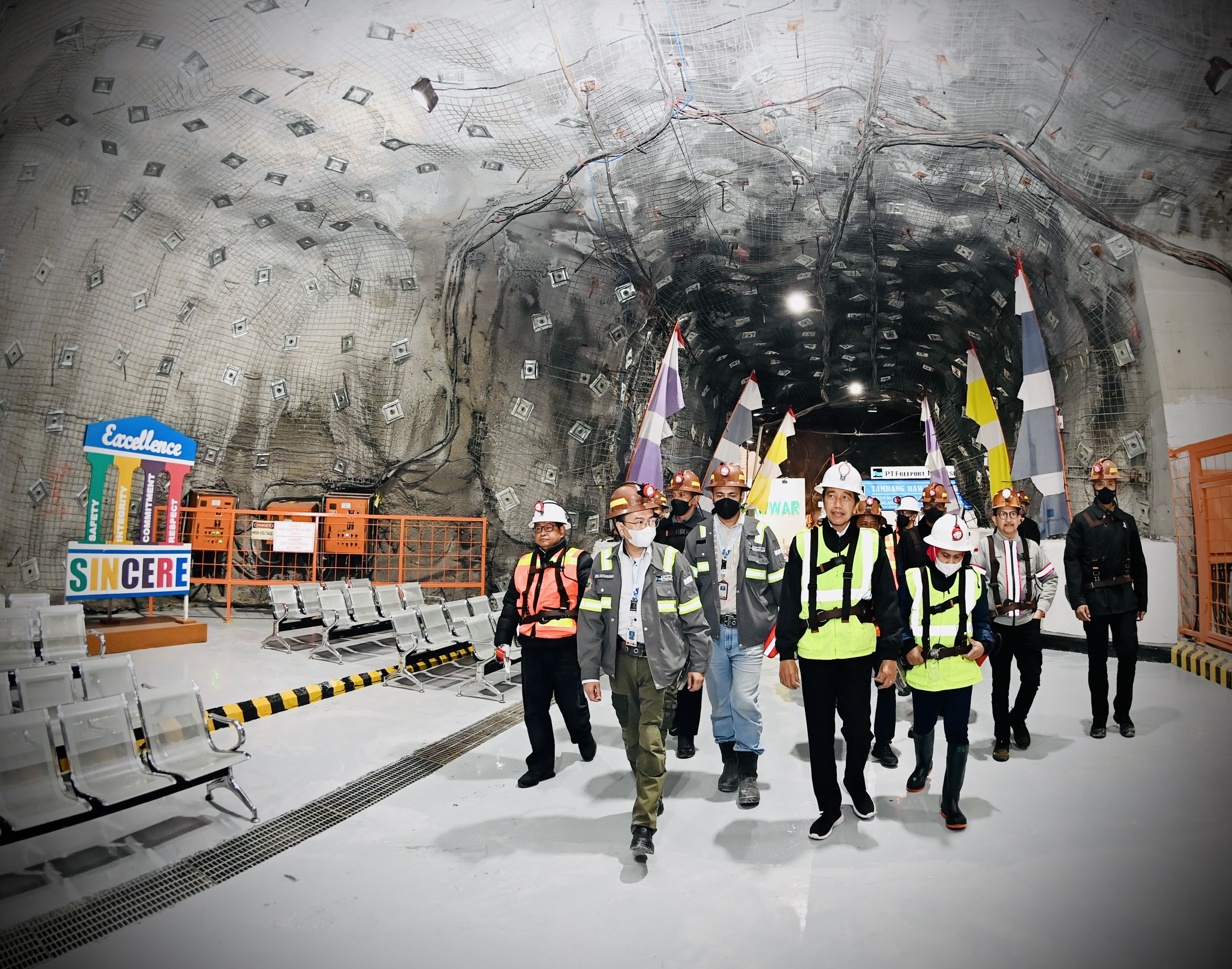
Underground portion of Grasberg Mine visited by President of Indonesia Joko Widodo

The workings include a large open pit mine 2.4 kilometres (1.5 mi) wide at the surface completed in 2019, three operating underground mines (Grasberg Block Cave, Deep Mill Level Zone and Big Gossan) and four concentrators. The mine is a high-volume, low-cost underground mining operation, producing and milling more than 72 million tonnes of ore in 2023.

Ore undergoes primary crushing at the mine, before being delivered by ore passes to the mill complex for further crushing, grinding and flotation. Grasberg's milling and concentrating complex is the largest in the world, with four crushers and two giant semi-autogenous grinding (SAG) units processing a daily average of 240,000 tonnes of ore in 2006.

A flotation reagent is used to separate a copper-gold concentrate from the ore. Slurry containing the copper-gold concentrate is delivered by three pipelines to the seaport of Amamapare, over 70 miles (100 km) away, where it is dewatered. Once filtered and dried, the concentrate – containing copper, gold and silver – is shipped to smelters around the world.

The facilities at the port include a coal-fired power station supplying the Grasberg operations, which will be replaced in 2027 by a 265-megawatt liquefied natural gas-fired combined cycle gas turbine power plant.

== Environment ==
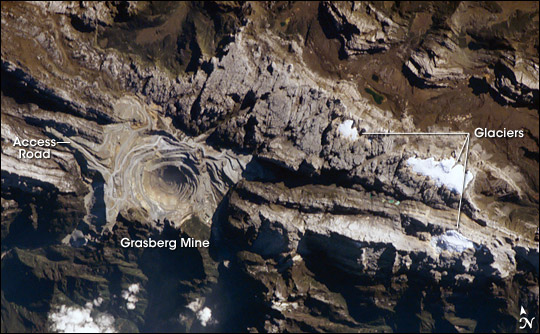
The Grasberg Mine complex from space in 2005. Puncak Jaya is the high point of the snow-covered ridge to the east of the mine. The peak is at 4,884 metres (16,024 ft) above sea level. The rim of the open pit is at about 4,270 metres (14,010 ft).

The concentrator's tailings, generated at a rate of 700,000 tonnes per day, are the subject of considerable environmental concern, as they wash into the Aikwa riverine system and Arafura Sea. Some 130 square kilometres (50 sq mi) (eventually 230 square kilometres (89 sq mi)) of lowland areas along the Aikwa River, are covered by braided sedimentary channels indicative of high sediment load (similar to glacial runoff). Most native fish have disappeared from now-turbid waters of the Aikwa River, which are unsuitable for aquatic life. The overburden (700 kt/d) remains in the highlands, up to 480 m deep and covering 8 square kilometres (3 sq mi). Its acidic runoff, dissolved copper, and the finer material gets washed into the headwaters of the Wanagon River. It settles out along the river course and then into the ocean, and will continue to do so indefinitely. Freeport's official response is that overburden is placed in the highlands as part of its Overburden Management Plan, at "sites capped with limestone and constantly monitored. Tailings are transported to the lowlands in a designated river system. Once reaching the lowlands, they are captured in an engineered system of levees built for that purpose." An Indonesian Environment Ministry's field report from 2004 found sediment levels of 37,500 milligrams per litre as the river entered the lowlands and 7,500 milligrams as the river entered the Arafura Sea, while the maximum under Indonesian law is 400 milligrams per litre.

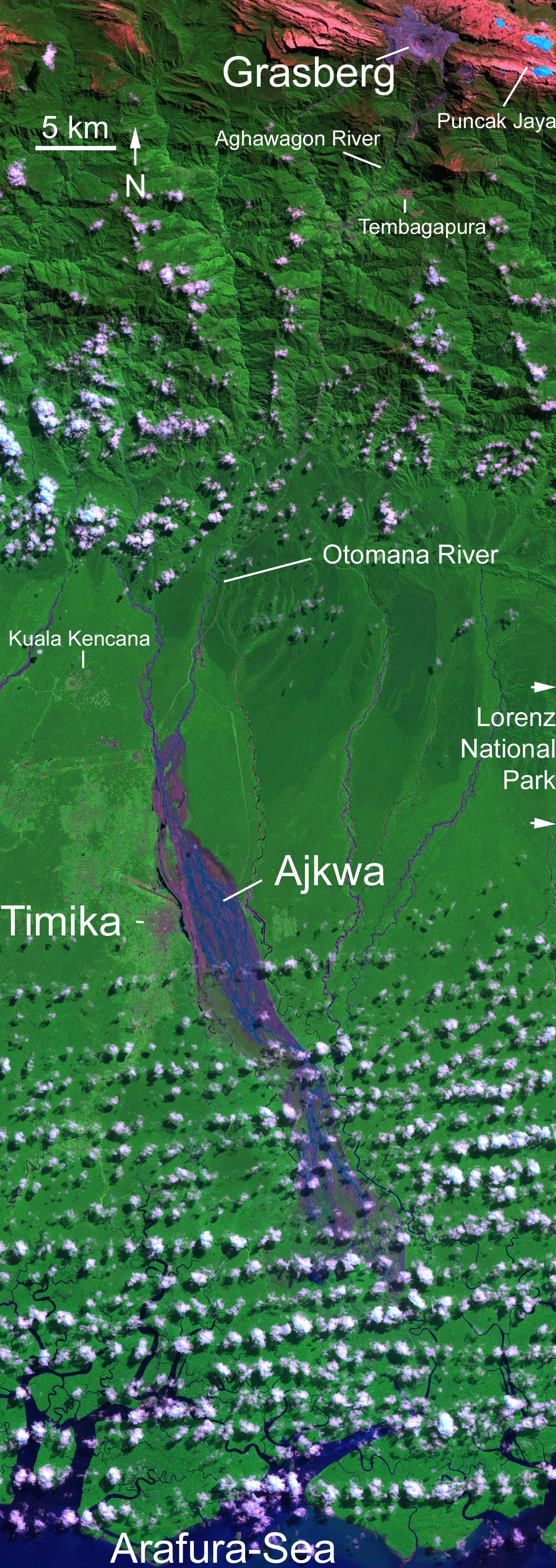
Freeport's Contract of Work Area. Deep purple in the river is mine tailings (2003).

In 1995, the Overseas Private Investment Corporation (OPIC) revoked Freeport's insurance policy for environmental violations of a sort that would not be allowed in the US. It was the first action of this sort by OPIC, and Freeport responded with a lawsuit against them. Freeport argued that an environmental report reached inaccurate conclusions, the result of a single 1994 visit to Grasberg. The company later underwent an independent environmental audit by Dames & Moore and got a clean bill of health. In April 1996, Freeport canceled its policy with the OPIC, stating that their corporate activities had outgrown the policy's limits. The OPIC report was later publicly released.

=== Environmental damage ===
While landscape reclamation projects have begun at the mine, environmental groups and local citizens are concerned with the potential for copper contamination and acid mine drainage from the mine tailings into surrounding river systems, land surfaces, and groundwater. Freeport argues that its actions meet industry standards and have been approved by the requisite authorities. It was reported in 2005 that since 1997 Freeport had been breaching Indonesian environmental laws. Freeport estimated it will generate six billion tons of waste.

Freeport has been excluded from the investment portfolio of The Government Pension Fund of Norway, the world's second-largest pension fund, due to criticism over the environmental damages caused by the Grasberg mine. Its partner in Grasberg, Rio Tinto, was also excluded during the period 2008–2019. Stocks at a value of ca. US$870 million were divested from the fund as a result of the decisions.

== Attacks on the mine ==
Violent ambushes near the Grasberg mine have occurred as early as August 2002, when Rickey Lynn Spier, Leon Edwin Burgon, and Bambang Riwanto, three contract school teachers were killed in the attack. Kopassus, the Indonesian Special Forces, allegedly instigated the incident. Independent activists alleged multiple incidents such as the August 2002 attack appear to have been instigated by Indonesian forces, some including the TNI, Tentara Nasional Indonesia, who are not fully subsidized by the government, leaving them dependent on being the source of security for extractive companies in an area such as Freeport. The need for profit motivates planned incidents such as these resulting in the "need" for increased protection of the mine sites. These incidents have increased when Freeport's security needs have decreased. Although investigations by Polda Papua and FBI confirmed the perpetrator to be Antonius Wamang, JH, MK, DM, AA, GM, JK, EO, and YD. They were arrested in 2006 based on fingerprint evidences on all four crime scenes. Wamang died in 2022, and his relative confirmed he was member of OPM, who in 1980s left his family and joined TPNPB, by 1999 he was appointed Kalikopi faction operation commander by Kelly Kwalik, whose area of operation included the Grasberg mine.

A series of attacks started on 11 July 2009 and continued for more than five days. A Freeport employee, 29-year-old Australian Drew Grant was shot and killed while sitting in the back of a car on the way to a game of golf. Indonesian police indicated that Grant was killed by five shots he sustained to the neck, chest and stomach by unknown assailants using military-issue weapons. The attack also killed Freeport security guard Markus Ratealo and a number of police officers.

On 7 April 2011, two Freeport employees were killed when the company car they were traveling in caught fire. Bullets were found inside the car, giving weight to the suspicion that the car was fired on by unknown gunmen. This incident sparked a protest by hundreds of Freeport employees concerned about the security along the jungle road leading up to the mine.

The Grasberg mine has been a frequent source of friction in Papua. Causes of friction are the mine's environmental impact on Papua, the perceived low share of profits going to local Papuans (Freeport's annual report shows it made $4.1billion in operating profit on revenue of $6.4billion in 2010) and the questionable legality of the payments made to Indonesian security forces for their services to guard the site.

== Accidents and incidents ==
In 2003, a landslide killed eight workers. A government investigation concluded that the incident was the result of negligence. Important warning signs had been detected two days prior. In response to this, management moved some equipment, but did not keep workers out of the area. Activist Yosepha Alomang called on Freeport-McMoRan to leave Papua, accusing the company of causing the accident and massive environmental damage. A month later two workers died from exposure to sulfur fumes. The government ultimately overturned the investigation's conclusion, and attributed the incident to natural causes.

In 2013, a roof collapse in the Big Gossan Mine underground training centre trapped 38 workers. Only 10 survived. The miners were trapped inside a lower chamber while attending a refresher training course on work safety in underground mining areas. The absence of a secondary escape route was critical to the loss of life. According to the Freeport McMoran geological team, the collapse at the Big Gossan tunnel was caused by erosion of the ceiling, brought about by the continuous infiltration of the limestone wallrocks by corrosive acidic groundwater. Freeport was accused of negligence by the Indonesian National Human Rights Commission.

In 2025, seven workers were trapped in a landslide. All seven were recovered dead. A hike in international copper prices was attributed to this accident.

=== Strikes ===
Production at the mine has been affected by several strikes:

On October 17, 2011, the company halted operations in Papua amid a strike that led to a deteriorating security situation and intensified calls for Papuan independence. Seventy percent of Grasberg workers joined the strike, appealing for higher pay September 15, 2011, blocking roads, clashing with police and cutting the pipeline in several places.

In October 2014, around 1,000 workers stayed home and demanded the firing of 50 managers as a result of a fatal accident at the Grasberg mine. Production declined to 60–70% of normal levels as a result of the strike.

In 2017, 5,000 workers at the mine participated in a labor strike that lasted over 4 months.

== See also ==
- Tembagapura
- Mile 50
