= Frank Sokoy =

Indonesian footballer

Personal information
- Full name: Frank Rikhart Sokoy
- Date of birth: 5 October 1997 (age 29)
- Place of birth: Jayapura, Indonesia
- Height: 1.69 m (5 ft 7 in)
- Position: Left-back

Team information
- Current team: Sumsel United
- Number: 25

Senior career*
Years	Team	Apps	(Gls)
2017	Persipuncak Puncak		
2019	Persitoli Tolikara	2	(0)
2019–2020	Perseta Tulungagung	7	(0)
2021–2022	Persebaya Surabaya	13	(0)
2022–2023	Barito Putera	24	(0)
2023–2024	Gresik United	17	(0)
2024	Madura United	6	(0)
2025	PSBS Biak	6	(0)
2025–2026	Persijap Jepara	2	(0)
2026	→ Persiraja Banda Aceh (loan)	11	(0)
2026–	Sumsel United	1	(0)
- * Club domestic league appearances and goals as of 13 September 2026

Frank Rikhart Sokoy (born 5 October 1997) is an Indonesian professional footballer who plays as a left-back for Championship club Sumsel United.

== Club career ==
=== Persipuncak Puncak ===
Frank played for Persipuncak Puncak in the 2017 Liga 3 Papua zone, he was on the same club as Donny Monim and Frengky Kogoya who were then coached by Johanes Songgonau.

=== Persebaya Surabaya ===
He was signed for Persebaya Surabaya to play in Liga 1 in the 2021 season. Sokoy made his league debut on 4 September 2021 in a match against Borneo at the Wibawa Mukti Stadium, Cikarang.

=== Barito Putera ===
Sokoy was signed for Barito Putera to play in Liga 1 in the 2022–23 season. He made his league debut on 23 July 2022 in a match against Madura United at the Gelora Ratu Pamelingan Stadium, Pamekasan.

== Career statistics ==
=== Club ===
As of 13 September 2026.

Club	Season	League			Cup		Continental		Other		Total	
Club	Season	Division	Apps	Goals	Apps	Goals	Apps	Goals	Apps	Goals	Apps	Goals
Persitoli Tolikara	2019	Liga 3	2	0	0	0	–		–		2	0
Perseta Tulungagung	2019	Liga 3	7	0	0	0	–		–		7	0
Persebaya Surabaya	2021–22	Liga 1	13	0	0	0	–		1 (Note: Appearances in Menpora Cup)	0	14	0
Barito Putera	2022–23	Liga 1	24	0	0	0	–		4 (Note: Appearances in Indonesia President's Cup)	0	28	0
Gresik United	2023–24	Liga 2	17	0	0	0	–		0	0	17	0
Madura United	2024–25	Liga 1	6	0	0	0	2 (Note: Appearances in AFC Challenge League)	0	0	0	8	0
PSBS Biak	2024–25	Liga 1	6	0	0	0	0	0	0	0	6	0
Persijap Jepara	2025–26	Liga 1	2	0	0	0	–		0	0	2	0
Persiraja Banda Aceh (loan)	2025–26	Championship	11	0	0	0	–		0	0	11	0
Sumsel United	2026–27	Championship	1	0	0	0	–		0	0	1	0
Career total			89	0	0	0	2	0	5	0	96	0
