= Marsinah =

Indonesian worker and trade unionist (1969–1993)

- Portrait, date unknown
- Born: Marsinah; 10 April 1969; Nglundo, Nganjuk, East Java, Indonesia
- Disappeared: 5 May 1993 (aged 24); Tanggulangin, Sidoarjo, East Java, Indonesia
- Status: Disappeared from 5 – 8 May 1993 (3 days)
- Cause of death: Murder
- Body discovered: 8 May 1993; Wilangan, Nganjuk Regency, East Java, Indonesia
- Education: Senior High School (SLTA)
- Occupations: Factory worker; trade unionist
- Parents: Astin (father); Sumini (mother)
- Awards: Yap Thiam Hien Award (1993)

Marsinah (10 April 1969 – c. 8 May 1993) was an independent trade unionist employed in a watch factory in East Java, Indonesia, whose murder drew international attention to the Suharto dictatorship's repression of workers.

Marsinah was serving as a negotiator for 500 workers striking over their employer's failure to implement the minimum wage and trade union autonomy. On 5 May, she was kidnapped following a demonstration; her mutilated body was found four days later. The military is widely believed to have been involved in her disappearance and subsequent death.

== Early life ==
The second of three daughters of Sumini and Mastin, Marsinah grew up under the care of her grandmother, Puirah, and her aunt Sini, in Nglundo, East Java. She went to school at State Elementary School 189 of Karangasem, subsequently State Junior High School 5 of Nganjuk. Her girlhood years were marked with commerce, selling snacks in order to augment the incomes of her grandmother and aunt. Marsinah's final school years were spent at the Muhammadiyah Boarding School, her educational advancement being denied due to lack of money.

== Factory work and activism ==
Unable to find employment in Nglundo, Marsinah turned her attention to the big cities, sending in job applications to Surabaya, Mojokerto and Gresik. Initially hired by Bata Shoes to work at their Surabaya factory in 1989, she moved a year later to PT Catur Putra Surya (formerly Empat Putra Surya), a watch factory in Sidoarjo. Making a lateral transfer to their Porong factory after its opening, Marsinah eventually found herself serving as a spokesperson for her fellow workers.

In March 1993, the Governor of East Java announced a 20% raise in the provincial minimum wage, however Catur Putra Surya (a company with ties to the Indonesian military–industrial complex) refused to comply. On 3–4 May, workers went on strike demanding implementation of the minimum wage and that the local unit of the state-controlled workers union, Serikat Pekerja Seluruh Indonesia (SPSI), be disbanded. Marsinah went to the Indonesian Ministry of Labor to retrieve a copy of the gubernatorial directive, which was later delivered to the factory management.

== Murder ==
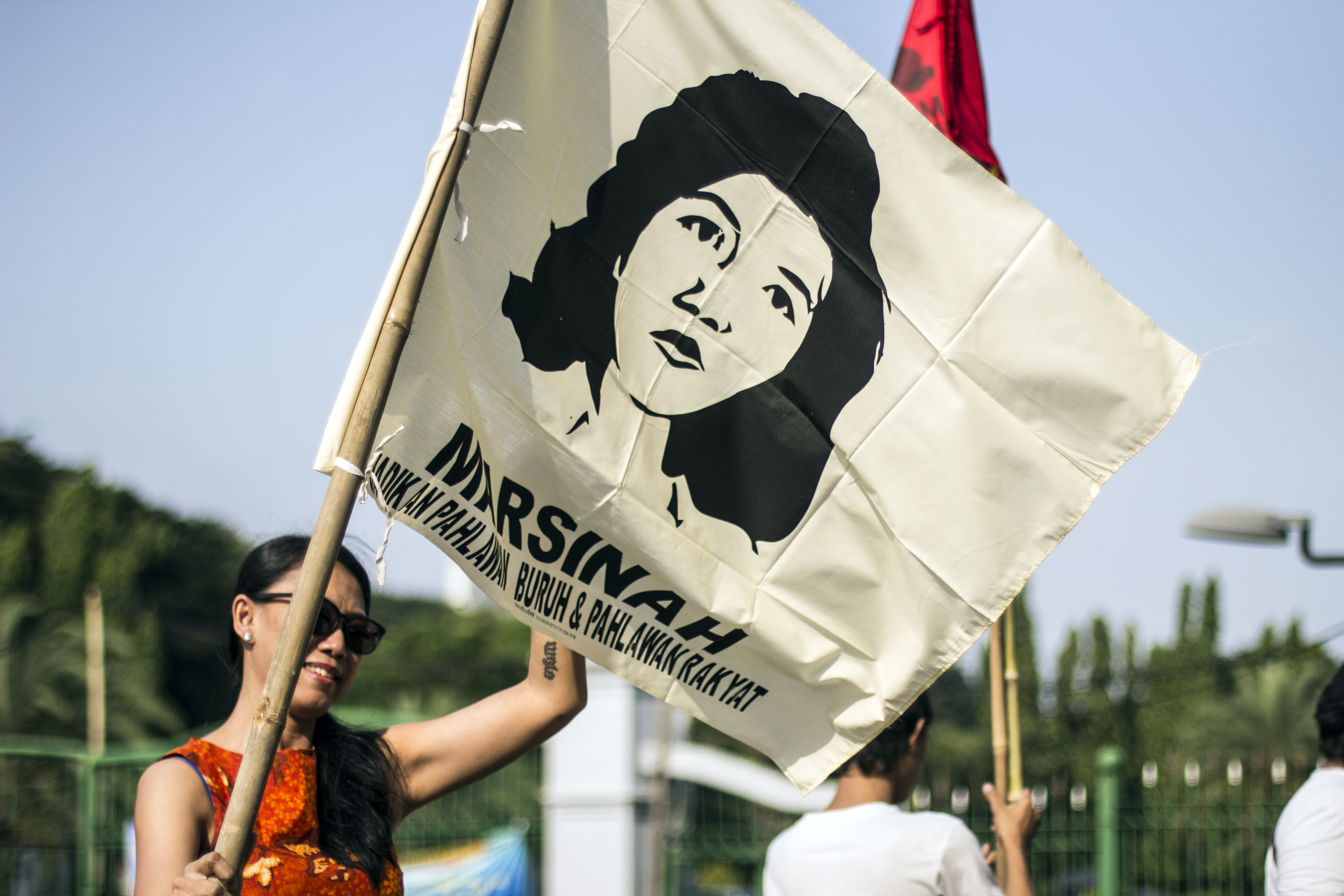
Demonstration on the 25th anniversary of Marsinah's murder, Jakarta, 8 May 2018. The text reads "Marsinah – workers' hero and people's hero"

On 5 May, the Sidoarjo District Military Command summoned 13 workers to its headquarters and forced them to sign letters of resignation, with eight more to follow in the next couple of days. Outraged by this turn of events, Marsinah decided to go there herself and demand an explanation that very same day.

She was disappeared and never seen alive again. She was kidnapped, raped, and tortured to death. Her mutilated body was found some distance from the factory on 8 May 1993. The autopsy report by forensic teams at dr. Soetomo Hospital Surabaya wrote that nearly every bone in her hips were "shattered" or broken. (Note: Quoted in Indonesian: "Tulang panggul bagian depan hancur. Tulang kemaluan kiri patah berkeping-keping, tulang kemaluan kanan patah, tulang usus kanan patah sampai terpisah. Tulang selangkangan kanan patah seluruhnya. Labia minora kiri robek dan ada serpihan tulang". Translated to English: "Frontal hip bone was destroyed. Left pubis was broken in pieces, right pubis was broken, right ilium was broken to the point it's separated. Pelvic bone was completely broken. Left labia minora were torn and pieces of bone was found.") Autopsy also observed 3 centimeter long (1.2 inch) traumatic injury in her vagina, with bleeding in her stomach. A forensic expert believed that Marsinah most likely had a gun forcefully inserted and fatally shot through her vagina.

Both Indonesian army and police attempted a coverup of Marsinah's murder. Nine civilians were arrested by Intelligence Detachment Command of Kodam Brawijaya and then confined for 19 days before the case gets transferred to the police. Those nine civilians were brought to trial for her murder but were later released by the Supreme Court when it was found that their confessions had been coerced. Those who were detained said that they have been tortured; human rights advocate noted accounts where they were electrocuted in the ears, forced to drink the officers' and their own urine, forced to clean the floor using their tongue, and forced to cut grass with their mouth and swallowing it. (The military denied the accounts.) While the military had been involved in the factory's security and there was evidence pointing to military involvement in her murder, the murderers were never brought to justice.

== Campaigns for justice ==
Women's groups and human rights groups applied pressure and a broad range of Indonesians commemorated Marsinah's martyrdom. Campaigns by Indonesian women's organisations, labour organisations, and human rights groups featured Marsinah. Indonesian media was slow to report the incident at the watch factory, as government censorship was strict. Surabaya Post only reported on the incident two weeks after the death of Marsinah. A fact-finding team independent from the government was established by the Workers Solidarity Forum (FORSOL) two weeks after the discovery of her body. Within a month, the Komite Solidaritas Untuk Marsinah (KSUM), a solidarity committee formed by 20 non-governmental organisations, was formed to monitor and investigate the actions of authorities in relation to the murder. Marsinah's murder was also used by human rights groups to pressure the United States to prevent the renewal of Indonesia's most favoured nation status.

In 2002, Indonesian President Megawati Sukarnoputri approved an investigation by the Human Rights Commission.

== Legacy ==
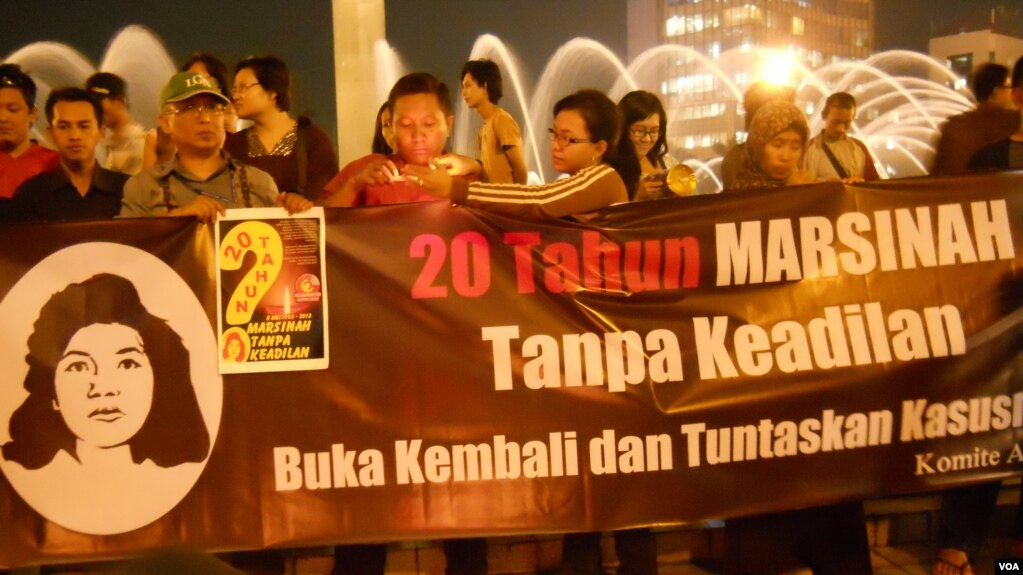
Action at the HI Roundabout in Jakarta demanding the resolution of the death case of Marsinah, who was murdered 20 years ago, (May 2013)

She was posthumously awarded the Yap Thiam Hien Award, and her murder was officially noted by the International Labour Organization as Case# 1773. On November 10, 2025, she was declared a National Hero of Indonesia, ironically alongside Suharto himself.
