= Anis Hidayah =

Indonesian activist (born 1976)

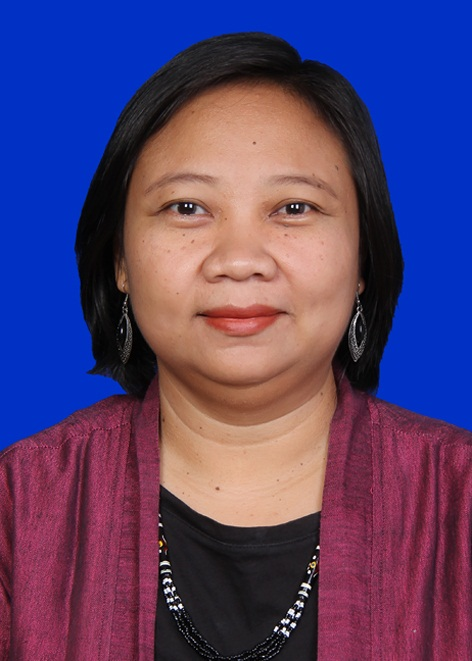
- Born: 7 November 1976 (age 49); Bojonegoro Regency, East Java, Indonesia
- Occupation: human rights activist
- Years active: 1998–present
- Known for: migrant worker advocate
- Notable work: co-founder of Migrant Care

Anis Hidayah (born 1976) is an Indonesian activist who works with migrant workers and human rights issues. Her work has been recognized by Human Rights Watch in Toronto with the receipt of the Alison Des Forges Award in 2011 and the Yayasan Pusat Studi Hak Asasi Manusia with the Yap Thiam Hien Award for human rights in 2014. She was listed by BBC 100 Women in 2013.

== Early life ==
Anis Hidayah was born on 7 November 1976 in a small village in the Bojonegoro Regency of East Java, in Indonesia. As a child, she became aware of how many members of her community had migrated abroad in search of work, leaving their children in care of grandparents. She enrolled in law school and attended Jember University in the Jember Regency and became involved in the Indonesian Islamic Students Movement (Indonesian: Pergerakan Mahasiswa Islam Indonesia (PMII)). In 1998, Hidayah learned of the rape of a migrant woman and her lack of recourse. The victim left her job, but her attacker neither had to pay her wages for her broken contract nor did he face any criminal charges. When the victim returned to Indonesia, there was no rehabilitation or assistance for her either, which inspired Hidayah to complete her bachelor's thesis on the plight of migrant workers.

Of the seven million migrant Indonesian workers employed in places like Kuwait, Malaysia and Saudi Arabia, six million are women. Most were employed in domestic service or as nannies. Signing a two-year contract for services, once they leave the country, there are few laws that protect them and no monitoring by the Indonesian government of them or their working conditions. Hidayah joined the East Java Women's Solidarity organization in 1999 and worked with them for a year and a half before beginning her graduate studies. The organization was at the time, the only organization dealing with migrant issues. Hidayah did not complete her graduate degree, because of her involvement in founding Migrant Care.

== Career ==
In 2004, Hidayah co-founded an NGO, "Migrant Care" to advocate for immigrant Indonesians working abroad. The NGO pressed lawmakers to draft reforms to protect migrant laborers and provides legal services for women who have experienced violence or abuse, including situations which place them in debt servitude. They also maintain a database and establish service centers in areas with high migrant exodus to educate people about the pitfalls, their rights and have a system to track workers and help their families. Through protests, lobbying efforts with lawmakers and utilizing media to drive reform, Hidayah has become one of the most visible activists for Indonesia’s migrant workers. In 2012, Indonesian Parliament ratified the International Convention on the Protection of the Rights of All Migrant Workers and Members of Their Families, making a start to address the problem.

Hidayah believes that enough hasn't been done. Authorities are slow to act when abuse occurs. In the run-up to the 2014 elections, it was promised that policies would control trafficking agencies, reform worker protections and improve to legal aid for migrant workers. Hidayah argued that allowing the death penalty to be carried out in Indonesia, directly impacted the ability to negotiate for release of Indonesian workers abroad. Her concerns were substantiated when two domestic workers in Saudi Arabia were executed without prior notice. In response in 2015, the government announced plans to place a ban on migrant workers. Hidayah spoke against the plan, arguing that discrimination against migrants, which restricted worker's rights would not solve the problems they face. Instead, she urged the government enact laws which required reasonable working and living conditions for workers, restricted their mistreatment and gave them opportunities to improve their economic conditions. In 2016, Hidayah urged lawmakers to create regulations that would eliminate recruitment fees and would require true employment conditions to be disclosed to workers.

== Awards and recognition ==
In 2011, Hidayah received the Alison Des Forges Award from Human Rights Watch in Toronto for her advocacy on behalf of women and migrant workers. When the BBC launched its 100 Women Series in 2013, to discuss in depth for a month the issues facing 21st century women, Hidayah was one of the inaugural women asked to participate in the programs. In 2014, she was selected from a field of nearly 50 nominees, as the recipient of the Yap Thiam Hien Award, which recognizes the contributions of human rights defenders.
