= Frengky Kogoya =

Indonesian footballer

Personal information
- Full name: Frengky Pare Kogoya
- Date of birth: 22 June 1997 (age 29)
- Place of birth: Wamena, Indonesia
- Height: 1.59 m (5 ft 3 in)
- Position: Midfielder

Youth career
- 2009–2010: Persipuja Puncak Jaya
- 2011–2012: Tunas Garuda Go To Arsenal
- 2016: Persipura U-21

Senior career*
Years	Team	Apps	(Gls)
2013–2017	Yahukimo	14	(1)
2017	Persipuncak Puncak		
2017	PSPS Riau	7	(1)
2018	Persija Jakarta	4	(0)
2019	Badak Lampung	12	(0)
2020	Muba Babel United	1	(0)
- * Club domestic league appearances and goals

Frengky Pare Kogoya (born 22 June 1997) is an Indonesian professional footballer who plays as a midfielder.

== Club career ==
=== Persipuncak Puncak ===
Frengky played for Persipuncak Puncak in the 2017 Liga 3 Papua zone, he was on the same club as Donny Monim and Frank Sokoy who were then coached by Johanes Songgonau.

== Honours ==
=== Club ===
Persija Jakarta

- Liga 1: 2018
