= Persemi Mimika =

Indonesian football club

Persemi
- Full name: Persatuan Sepakbola Mimika
- Nickname: The Golden Boys
- Founded: 1996; 30 years ago
- Ground: Wania Imipi Stadium; Mimika, Central Papua, Indonesia
- Capacity: 7,000
- Owner: Mimika Regency Government
- Manager: Robby Kamaniel Omaleng
- Coach: Christian Warobay
- League: Liga 4
- 2024–25: 4th, Group A (Central Papua zone)
Home colours	Away colours

Persatuan Sepakbola Mimikia (simply known as Persemi) is an Indonesian football club based in Timika, Mimika Regency, Central Papua. They currently compete in the Liga 4 Central Papua zone.
