= Alfons Migau =

Indonesian footballer

Personal information
- Full name: Alfons Migau
- Date of birth: 2 December 1998 (age 27)
- Place of birth: Intan Jaya, Indonesia
- Height: 1.70 m (5 ft 7 in)
- Position: Winger

Team information
- Current team: Persinab Nabire
- Number: 12

Youth career
- SSB Immanuel
- 2017: Persipura Jayapura
- 2018: Solok
- 2019–2021: PON Papua

Senior career*
Years	Team	Apps	(Gls)
2022–2023	Persipura Jayapura	5	(0)
2023–2024	Persewar Waropen	11	(0)
2025	PSBS Biak	0	(0)
2025–	Persinab Nabire	8	(1)
- * Club domestic league appearances and goals as of 11 January 2026

Alfons Migau (born 2 December 1998) is an Indonesian professional footballer who plays as a winger for Liga Nusantara club Persinab Nabire.

== Club career ==
=== Persipura Jayapura ===
He was signed for Persipura Jayapura to play in Liga 1 in 2022. Alfons made his professional debut on 6 January 2022 in a match against Persela Lamongan at the Kapten I Wayan Dipta Stadium, Gianyar.

== Career statistics ==
=== Club ===
As of 11 January 2026.

Club	Season	League			Cup		Other		Total	
Club	Season	Division	Apps	Goals	Apps	Goals	Apps	Goals	Apps	Goals
Persipura Jayapura	2021	Liga 1	3	0	0	0	0	0	3	0
Persipura Jayapura	2022–23	Liga 2	2	0	0	0	0	0	2	0
Persewar Waropen	2023–24	Liga 2	7	0	0	0	0	0	7	0
Persewar Waropen	2024–25	Liga 2	4	0	0	0	0	0	4	0
PSBS Biak	2024–25	Liga 1	0	0	0	0	0	0	0	0
Persinab Nabire	2025–26	Liga Nusantara	8	1	0	0	0	0	8	1
Career total			24	1	0	0	0	0	24	1

== Honours ==
=== Club ===
Persipura U-19

- Liga 1 U-19: 2017
