= Sandyawan Sumardi =

Ignatius Sandyawan Sumardi is a former Jesuit priest, closely linked to humanitarian activities in Indonesia after the Indonesian 1998 Revolution.

== Early life ==
Son of Andreas Sumardi (a retired police lieutenant) and Suzana, he was born in Jeneponto, South Sulawesi, as the youngest son of the family that depended on his father's modest salary. Following his father, Kuncoro, as Sandyawan was called during his childhood, was raised in different places, from Ujung Pandang (Provincial capital of South Sulawesi, now called Makassar) to Banjarnegara (where he finished the elementary school), to Bantul and Magelang (where he entered the seminary school of his own choice), and then, finally, he entered the seminary school in Yogyakarta. Since a very early age and especially during his period of study, Sandyawan developed an aspiration and life-mission to help the poor and others who were less fortunate. Sandyawan was ordained as priest in 1988.

== Humanitarian work ==
=== 1980s ===
Sandyawan started as an activist when he was in the seminary in Yogyakarta, in mid 1980s. He studied the life of the poor's by putting on disguise and blend into the people, so that they don't know that he's a priest.

He disguised himself as a sugar factory laborer in Kendal, Central Java. For one whole month, Sandyawan worked as a laborer. The next month, he disguised himself as a farmer laborer in a village in Wonosari. He also took the role of laborer around Jakarta. The longest time he has been in disguise is when he was a milk factory laborer in Cijantung. While in disguise, he was able to discuss and exchange conversations with the actual laborers about their problems.

While in Yogyakarta, he was active in educating and empowering the rickshaw drivers. He counseled homeless families in Indonesia. He also helped Father Mangunwijaya in the latter's work with the displaced people of Kedung Ombo.

Upon being ordained, Sandyawan joined Institut Sosial Jakarta, an NGO which was founded in 1985 by several Catholic priests and monks focusing on counselling laborers. Soon after, Sandyawan was appointed as Operational Director of the NGO.

=== 1990s ===
In Indonesia his figure has become the focus of attention since the incident of 27 July 1996. While doing this he and his team continuously were hindered, mainly by those holding political/military power. Sandyawan's Independent Fact Finding Team, which intends to support those who become victims of brutal violence, mutilation and rape during the May 1998 riot, constantly have to face daily terrors and risk their lives.

== Retirement from priesthood ==
Sandiawan decided to retire from priesthood to concentrate on social activities, such as supporting the people of Kampung Pulo. He was quoted as saying that he would rather be called "Bapak" (mister in Indonesian, which also means "father") rather than "Romo" (how people address Catholic priests in Java, from "Father" in High Javanese). He shared his experience supporting a poor community living by the Ciliwung River in the Asian Theology of Liberation Symposium in 2014.

== See also ==
- Indonesian 1998 Revolution
