= Erik Sokoy =

Indonesian footballer

Personal information
- Full name: Erik Sokoy
- Date of birth: 13 September 1994 (age 32)
- Place of birth: Jayapura, Indonesia
- Height: 1.62 m (5 ft 4 in)
- Position: Right back

Youth career
- 2011–2013: Persidafon Dafonsoro

Senior career*
Years	Team	Apps	(Gls)
2013–2014	Persidafon Dafonsoro	4	(0)
2022–2023	Barito Putera	1	(0)
- * Club domestic league appearances and goals as of 6 August 2022

Erik Sokoy (born on September 13, 1994) is an Indonesian professional footballer who plays as a right back for Liga 1 club PS Barito Putera.
