= Tembagapura =

Tembagapura Distrik Tembagapura
- District
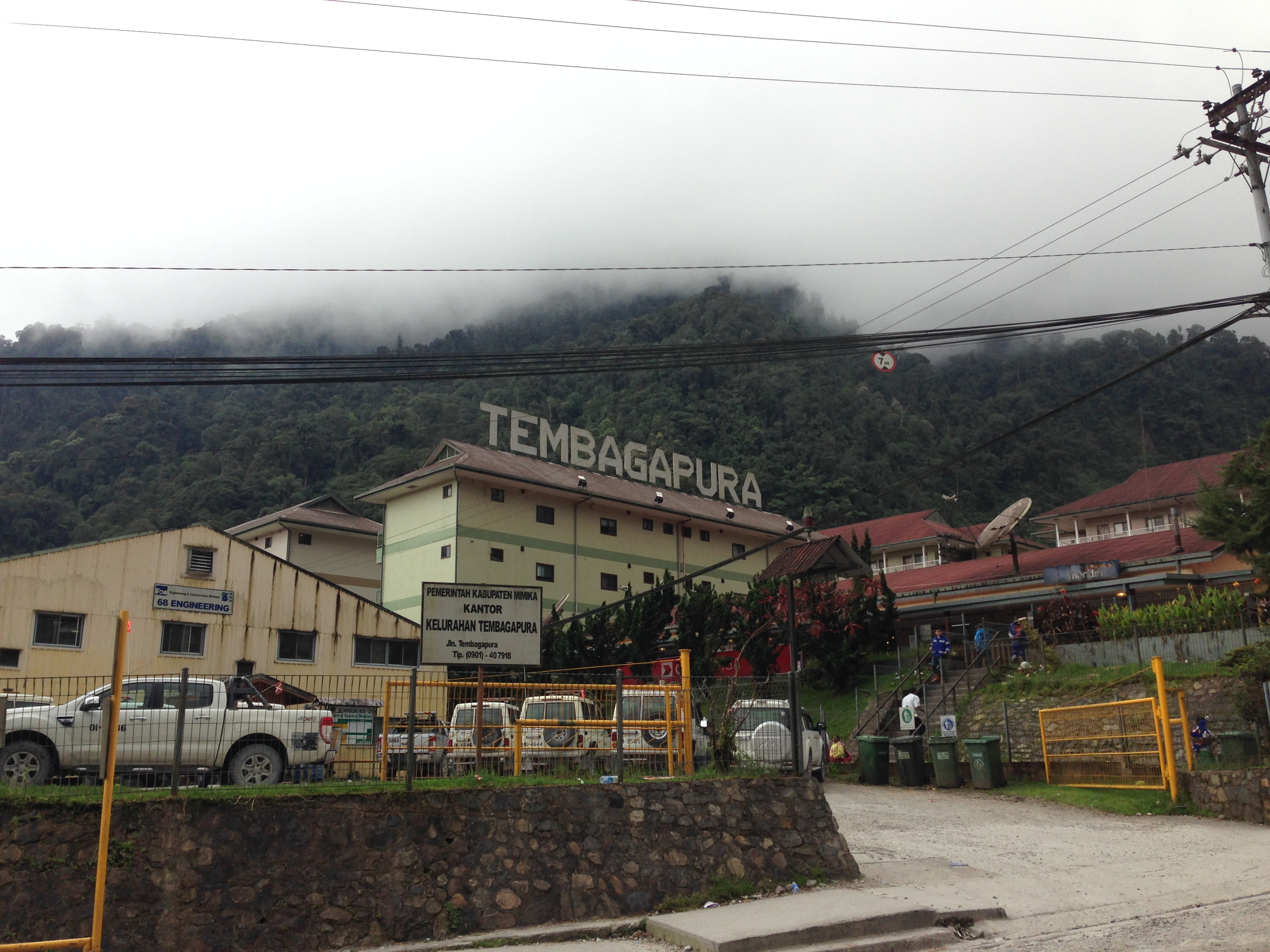
- The town of Tembagapura. The building on the extreme left is a Freeport engineering office, the buildings in the middle and on the right are accommodation blocks.

- Location in Central Papua Location in Indonesia
- Coordinates: 4°8′34″S 137°5′26″E
- Country: Indonesia
- Province: Central Papua
- Regency: Mimika Regency

Area
  - Total: 2,586.86 km^{2} (998.79 sq mi)
- Elevation: 1,900 m (6,200 ft)

Population
  - Total: 23,022 (2,020 Census)
- Time zone: UTC+9 (IEST)
- Area code: (+62) 901

Tembagapura is a district in Mimika Regency, part of the Indonesian province of Central Papua, centered on an urban village built to support the Grasberg Mine. The district covers 2,586.86 km^{2}, and it had a population of 16,917 at the 2010 Census and 23,022 at the 2020 Census.

The central town was established as a company town by Freeport-McMoran in the late 1960s.

== Etymology ==
Tembaga in Indonesian means "copper", while pura in Sanskrit is equivalent to "temple" or "town", meaning "Copper Town".

== Geography and climate ==
Tembagapura is situated on a rocky plain at an altitude of 1,930 metres (6,330 ft) at the base of Mount Zaagkam, which lies 16 kilometres (9.9 mi) southeast of the mine. The town is in the Sudirman Range, not far from Puncak Jaya (Mount Carstens), the highest peak in Oceania. The area gets about 3,220 millimetres (127 in) of rainfall each year. The weather is usually sunny in the morning, changing to cloudy and cool around noon.

== Climate ==
Tembagapura has a subtropical highland climate (Cfb) with heavy rainfall year-round.

Climate data for Tembagapura
Month	Jan	Feb	Mar	Apr	May	Jun	Jul	Aug	Sep	Oct	Nov	Dec	Year
Mean daily maximum °C (°F)	23.3 (73.9)	23.2 (73.8)	23.0 (73.4)	22.5 (72.5)	21.9 (71.4)	20.7 (69.3)	19.9 (67.8)	19.9 (67.8)	21.0 (69.8)	22.4 (72.3)	23.1 (73.6)	23.2 (73.8)	22.0 (71.6)
Daily mean °C (°F)	17.8 (64.0)	17.8 (64.0)	17.9 (64.2)	17.6 (63.7)	17.3 (63.1)	16.4 (61.5)	15.9 (60.6)	15.8 (60.4)	16.3 (61.3)	17.2 (63.0)	17.6 (63.7)	17.8 (64.0)	17.1 (62.8)
Mean daily minimum °C (°F)	12.4 (54.3)	12.5 (54.5)	12.8 (55.0)	12.7 (54.9)	12.7 (54.9)	12.2 (54.0)	11.9 (53.4)	11.7 (53.1)	11.6 (52.9)	12.0 (53.6)	12.1 (53.8)	12.5 (54.5)	12.3 (54.1)
Average precipitation mm (inches)	248 (9.8)	306 (12.0)	266 (10.5)	272 (10.7)	273 (10.7)	292 (11.5)	299 (11.8)	296 (11.7)	277 (10.9)	248 (9.8)	221 (8.7)	222 (8.7)	3,220 (126.8)
Source: Climate-Data.org

== History ==
Construction of the mine and its infrastructure, including the town, commenced in the late-1960s. Prior to this, the surrounding area had been inhabited by about 500 members of the Amung people living in traditional villages. However, as the settlement and the mine grew, migrants from other parts of Papua (e.g. the Dani people) and outside the island moved in, causing social tensions between the new arrivals and the locals. Popular unrest attributed to the Free Papua Movement including acts of violence against mining facilities occurred, resulting in relocations of and reprisals against indigenous Papuans by the Indonesian Army.

In 1981, Tembagapura was reported to have housed over 3,000 mine workers and their dependents. In 1994, biologist Tim Flannery visited the town and reported it to have a population in excess of 10,000 people, with most of the amenities of a smaller urban community in the US, including sports facilities, a club with a bar and restaurant, supermarkets and specialty shops, a bank, and excellent accommodations for workers and visitors. Flannery observed that this was quite different from other locations in what was then called Irian Jaya.

Tembagapura has a school for English-speaking expatriate children that has been called "the world's most remote international school." The town has a hospital, a community library, a full-sized outdoor soccer field, indoor tennis and squash courts, and a state-of-the-art gymnasium. The Lupa Lelah Club, a focal point for expatriates, includes a restaurant, a bar, and various function rooms. Shopping facilities include a coffee shop, a Hero Supermarket, Guardian Pharmacy, Hero Department Store, and a hairdresser.

== Demographics ==
Tribal groups living near Tembagapura include the Ekari, Moni, Amungme and Dani people, who regard the land of the town and mine as belonging to their tribal lands, and not to the country of Indonesia. As a result, there is tension between the tribal peoples and the Indonesian Army, fueled and funded by the mining company. A security force, provided by the Indonesian Army, works to suppress the Indigenous inhabitants of the land.

== See also ==
- Kuala Kencana, another district and company town built by Freeport-McMoran in Mimika
- Mile 50, an area in the mining area in Tembagapura
