= Persinab Nabire =

Indonesian football club

Persinab
- Full name: Persatuan Sepakbola Indonesia Nabire
- Nicknames: Hiu Paus Kwatisore; The Black Turquoise
- Founded: 2004; 22 years ago
- Owner: Gorano Bintang Nabire
- Chairman: Markus Wanma
- Coach: Irwansyah
- League: Liga Nusantara
- 2025–26: Liga Nusantara/Regular Round (Group C), 4th
| Home colours | Away colours |

Persatuan Sepakbola Indonesia Nabire, commonly known as Persinab, is an Indonesian football club based in Nabire, Central Papua. They compete in Liga Nusantara, the third level of Indonesian football after taking the place of Sang Maestro.

== History ==
=== Foundation and early years (2004–2024) ===
Persatuan Sepakbola Indonesia Nabire (simply known as Persinab) was officially established in 2004 in Nabire Regency, Papua (now administratively included in Central Papua). Representing the region under the nickname Hiu Paus Kwatisore (Kwatisore Whale Sharks), the club was formed to spearhead local football development in the province. In its early history, the club majorly struggled to sustain a presence in the national tiers due to severe regional infrastructure limitations and a lack of standard stadium facilities. This stagnation kept the club inactive from mainstream national competitions for multiple seasons.

=== Acquisition of Sang Maestro and revival (2025–present) ===
In August 2025, the management of Persinab Nabire executed a strategic takeover to revive the club's professional status after failing to advance via standard regional qualifications. Fully backed by the Regent of Nabire and club chairman, Mesak Magai, the management officially acquired the competitive license of Sang Maestro Football Club, a newly promoted club based in Surabaya, East Java, that had secured a spot in the national third tier.

Through this license acquisition, Persinab Nabire took over the club's competitive slot and immediately relocated all football operations from East Java to the Nabire Regency. For the 2025–26 Liga Nusantara campaign, the team temporarily competed under the merged name Persinab Sang Maestro. Under the guidance of head coach Elie Aiboy, the revived squad actively recruited several veteran national figures, including striker Herman Dzumafo, to bolster their campaign.

Following the conclusion of the season, the management dropped the "Sang Maestro" suffix, officially returning the team's identity to Persinab Nabire ahead of the subsequent league cycles to fully align with its Central Papuan heritage.

== Players ==
=== Current squad ===
As of June 2026

Note: Flags indicate national team as defined under FIFA eligibility rules; some limited exceptions apply. Players may hold more than one non-FIFA nationality.

| No. | Pos. | Nation | Player |
|---|---|---|---|
| 1 | GK | IDN | Ardhan Pratama |
| 2 | DF | IDN | Fajar Zainul |
| 4 | DF | IDN | Fernando Lekatompessy |
| 5 | DF | IDN | Hudson Kapisa |
| 7 | FW | IDN | Daud Kararbo |
| 8 | MF | IDN | Samuel Yobe |
| 9 | FW | IDN | Maikel Makai |
| 10 | MF | IDN | Jonier Kareth |
| 11 | FW | IDN | Yosmus Dudai |
| 12 | MF | IDN | Alfons Migau |
| 13 | DF | IDN | Barnabas Sobor |
| 15 | FW | IDN | Yusuf Yarmanto |
| 16 | FW | IDN | Wempi Woppi |
| 18 | GK | IDN | Barep Wahyudi |
| 19 | DF | IDN | Rui Aiboy |

| No. | Pos. | Nation | Player |
|---|---|---|---|
| 21 | FW | IDN | Albeto Waimbo |
| 22 | MF | IDN | Melvis Uaga |
| 23 | MF | IDN | Fitrah Agsyah |
| 26 | GK | IDN | Alim Hidayatullah |
| 30 | GK | IDN | Regan Fadillah |
| 37 | MF | IDN | Nabil Mumtas |
| 55 | DF | IDN | Derek Maury |
| 69 | DF | IDN | Dandi |
| 77 | MF | IDN | Ahmad Hasan |
| 86 | MF | IDN | Fernando Pamungkas |
| 88 | MF | IDN | Yohanis Hera |
| 93 | DF | IDN | Donny Monim |
| 96 | MF | IDN | Milan Nere |
| 99 | FW | IDN | Herman Dzumafo (captain) |

== Season-by-season records ==
| Season | League/Division | Tms. | Pos. | Piala Indonesia |
|---|---|---|---|---|
| 2025–26 | Liga Nusantara | 24 | 4th, Group C | — |
| 2026–27 | Liga Nusantara | 24 | TBD | — |

== Honours ==
- Liga Indonesia Second Division
  - Champions (1): 2011–12

== Sponsors ==
- Fourking Mandiri
- Bank Papua

== Kit supplier ==
- SPECS (2008–2011)
