= Persido Dogiyai =

Indonesian football club

Persido
- Full name: Persatuan Sepakbola Indonesia Dogiyai
- Nickname: Laskar Ukaa Mapega
- Founded: 2013; 13 years ago
- Ground: Theo Makai Field, Dogiyai Regency, Central Papua
- Owner: Dogiyai Regency Government
- Manager: Yosep Iyai
- Coach: Enrico Chiesa Yarangga
- League: Liga 4
- 2024–25: 3rd, (Central Papua zone)
Home colours	Away colours

Persatuan Sepakbola Indonesia Dogiyai (simply known as Persido) is an Indonesian football club based in Dogiyai Regency, Central Papua. They currently compete in the Liga 4.

== Honours ==
- Liga 3 Papua
  - Champion (1): 2017
  - Runner-up (1): 2023
- Liga 4 Central Papua
  - Third-place (1): 2024–25
