= Persipuncak Puncak =

Indonesian football club

Persipuncak
- Full name: Persatuan Sepakbola Indonesia Puncak
- Nickname: Salju Abadi Carstensz (The Eternal Snow of Carstensz)
- Founded: 2008; 18 years ago
- Ground: Trikora Field; Ilaga, Central Papua
- Owner: Puncak Regency Government
- Chairman: Elvis Tabuni
- Manager: Keril Tabuni
- Coach: Hendriko Kiwak
- League: Liga 4
- 2024–25: Champions, Central Papua zone; 4th place, Group F (National stage)
- Website: persipuncakcarstenzs.blogspot.com
Home colours

Persatuan Sepakbola Indonesia Puncak, commonly known as Persipuncak Puncak or simply known as Persipuncak, is an Indonesian football club based in Puncak Regency, Central Papua, Indonesia. The club currently competes in Liga 4, the fourth tier of the Indonesian football league system.

Persipuncak represents Puncak Regency and is supported by the local government. The club is nicknamed Salju Abadi Carstensz ("The Eternal Snow of Carstensz"), referring to the snow-capped peaks of the Carstensz Pyramid located in the region.

== History ==
Persipuncak has participated in several provincial football competitions in Papua and has represented Puncak Regency in national amateur competitions. The club previously took part in the regional stages of Indonesian lower-tier leagues, including the former Liga 3 Papua provincial competition.

In the 2024–25 season, Persipuncak emerged as the champions of the Liga 4 Central Papua zone, securing qualification for the national phase of the competition. At the national stage of Liga 4, the club competed in Group F and finished fourth in the group standings.

During the 2025–26 season of Liga 4 Central Papua, Persipuncak advanced to the final after defeating Persido Dogiyai in the semi-final match. However, they had to lose in the final match against Persipani Paniai with a score of 0–2.

Ahead of the following season, the club announced plans to strengthen the squad and improve its preparation in order to compete again for the Liga 4 Central Papua title.

== Identity ==
The nickname Salju Abadi Carstensz refers to the famous glacier and snowy peaks of the Carstensz Pyramid (Puncak Jaya), one of the highest mountains in Oceania located within the province of Central Papua.

== Honours ==
- Liga 4 Central Papua
  - Champion (1): 2024–25
  - Runner-up (1): 2025–26

== Support and administration ==
The club receives support from the Puncak Regency Government. Local authorities have expressed optimism that Persipuncak can reclaim the Liga 4 Central Papua title in future competitions.
