= Timika =

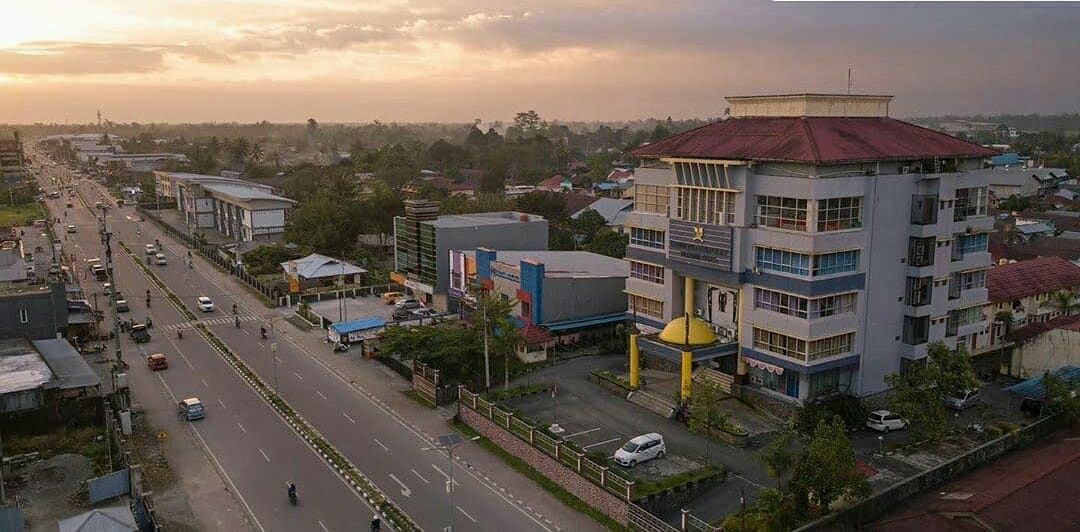
- Main street in Timika
- Interactive map of Timika
- Location in Central Papua Location in Indonesian Papua Location in Indonesia
- Coordinates: 4.55°S 136.89°E
- Country: Indonesia
- Province: Central Papua
- Regency: Mimika Regency

Government
  - Mayor: Yohanis Bassang
  - Vice Mayor: vacant

Population (2020 Census)
  - Total: 142,909
- Area code: (+62) 901
- Climate: Af

Timika is a chartered city (kota), and the capital of Mimika Regency on the southern coast of Central Papua, Indonesia. At the 2020 Census, the district which includes the town (it remains administratively within the Regency, rather than having a separate status) had a population of 142,909. Timika is a region focused on mining, industry, and services, as it is home to numerous national-scale companies due to the presence of the PT Freeport Indonesia gold mine. Timika is also a concentration of foreign nationals currently residing in Papua. Most of them work in the PT Freeport Indonesia area. Approximately 2,000 of these expatriates are from the United States, while the remainder are foreign nationals from Japan, Canada, Australia, and Germany.

== Air transport ==
In August 2012, the Indonesian government announced plans to develop a new commercial airport in Timika. The Mozes Kilangin International Airport will feature a new apron and taxiway created on an 800x300m plot of land adjacent to the existing airport.

Beginning from 15 August 2014, the airline Garuda Indonesia has been serving the Timika-Sorong-Manado route for 3 times a week with a Bombardier CRJ-1000 plane that has 84 economy class seats and 12 business class seats.

In 2026, Mozes Kilangin Airport served various domestic commercial flights out of Mimika as well as short-haul flights to several locations in the interior of Mimika. Direct domestic flight routes at this airport include routes to and from Jayapura, Nabire, Sorong, Asmat, Makassar, and Bali. Several flight routes in the interior of Mimika include routes to the districts of Jila, Jita, Tsinga, Aroanop and Alama. Short-haul flights also serve routes to several areas outside Mimika, such as to Ilaga, Sugapa, Enarotali, Moanamani, and so on.

== Climate ==
Timika has a tropical rainforest climate (Af) with heavy to very heavy rainfall year-round.

Climate data for Timika (Kokonao Airport) (2000–2020)
Month	Jan	Feb	Mar	Apr	May	Jun	Jul	Aug	Sep	Oct	Nov	Dec	Year
Mean daily maximum °C (°F)	32.7 (90.9)	32.8 (91.0)	32.5 (90.5)	32.0 (89.6)	31.2 (88.2)	29.7 (85.5)	28.6 (83.5)	29.0 (84.2)	30.2 (86.4)	31.6 (88.9)	32.4 (90.3)	32.7 (90.9)	31.3 (88.3)
Mean daily minimum °C (°F)	23.8 (74.8)	23.7 (74.7)	23.6 (74.5)	23.6 (74.5)	23.7 (74.7)	23.3 (73.9)	22.9 (73.2)	22.8 (73.0)	23.1 (73.6)	23.5 (74.3)	23.6 (74.5)	23.8 (74.8)	23.5 (74.2)
Average precipitation mm (inches)	373.0 (14.69)	347.7 (13.69)	386.7 (15.22)	473.1 (18.63)	551.6 (21.72)	646.9 (25.47)	658.1 (25.91)	616.8 (24.28)	440.5 (17.34)	405.8 (15.98)	334.4 (13.17)	455.0 (17.91)	5,689.6 (224.01)
Average precipitation days	18.3	17.5	19.9	21.1	20.9	21.9	24.0	22.5	21.8	18.2	17.1	20.4	243.6
Source: Meteomanz

== Gallery ==
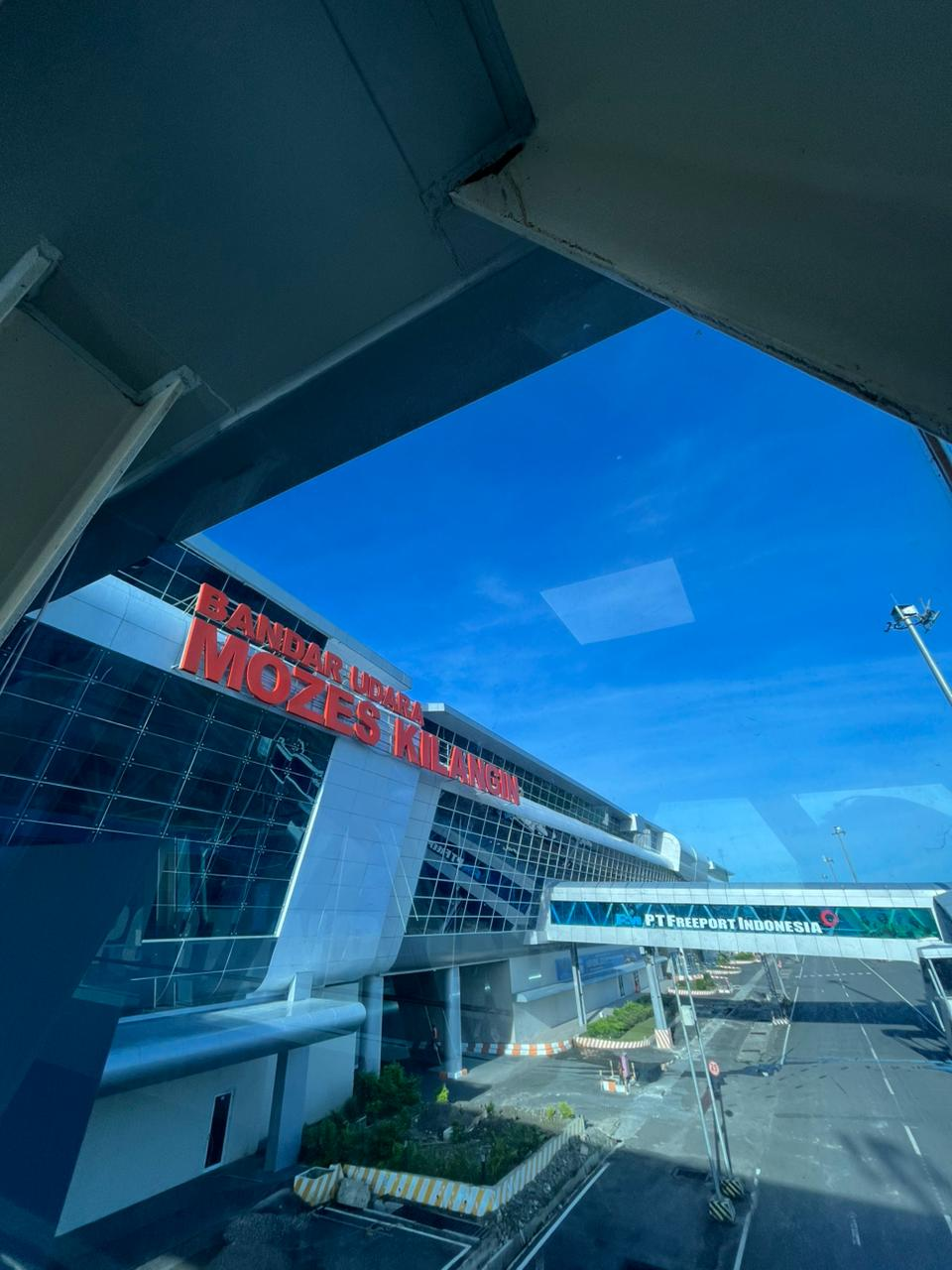
Mozes Kilangin Airport in Timika

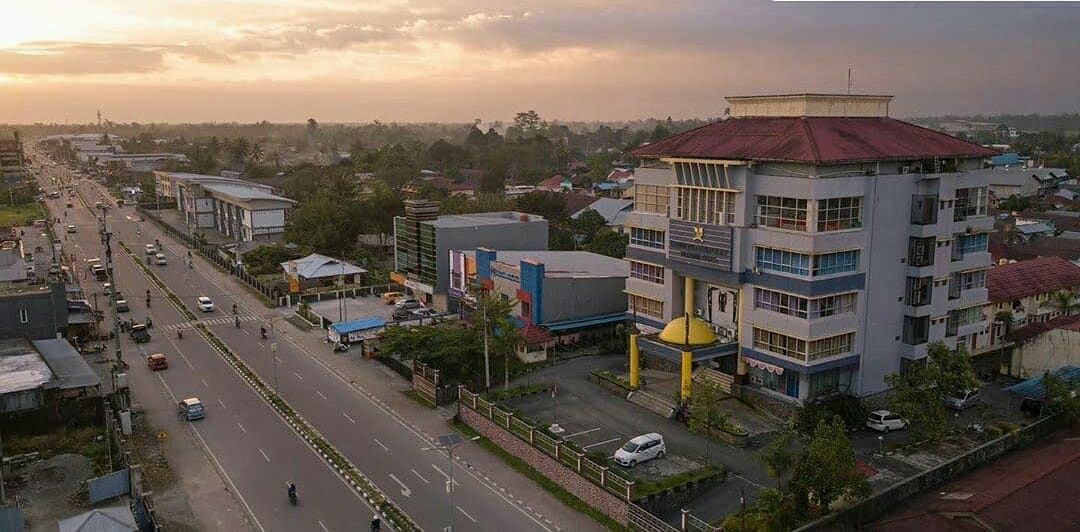
Timika in 2022

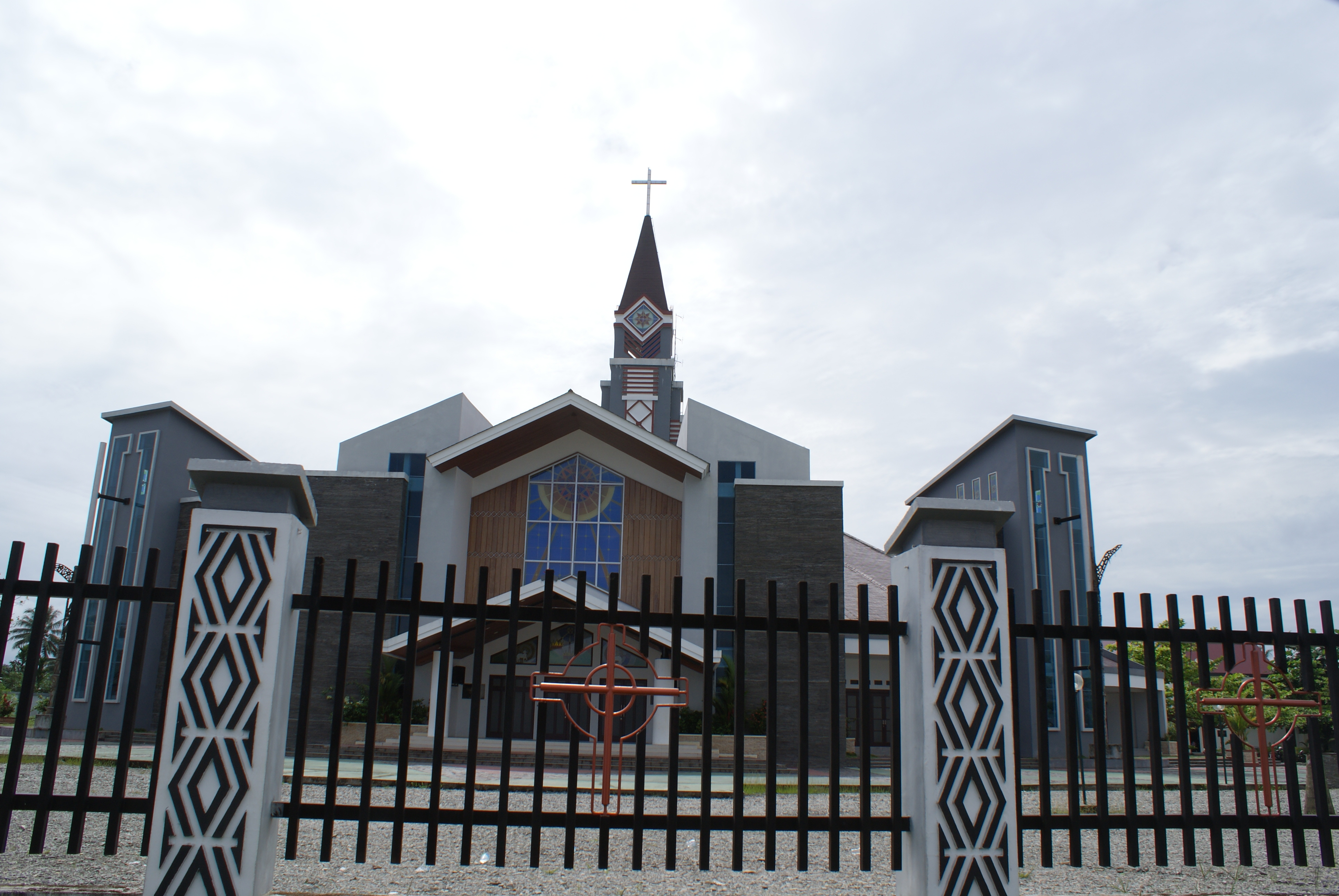
Cathedral Church in Timika

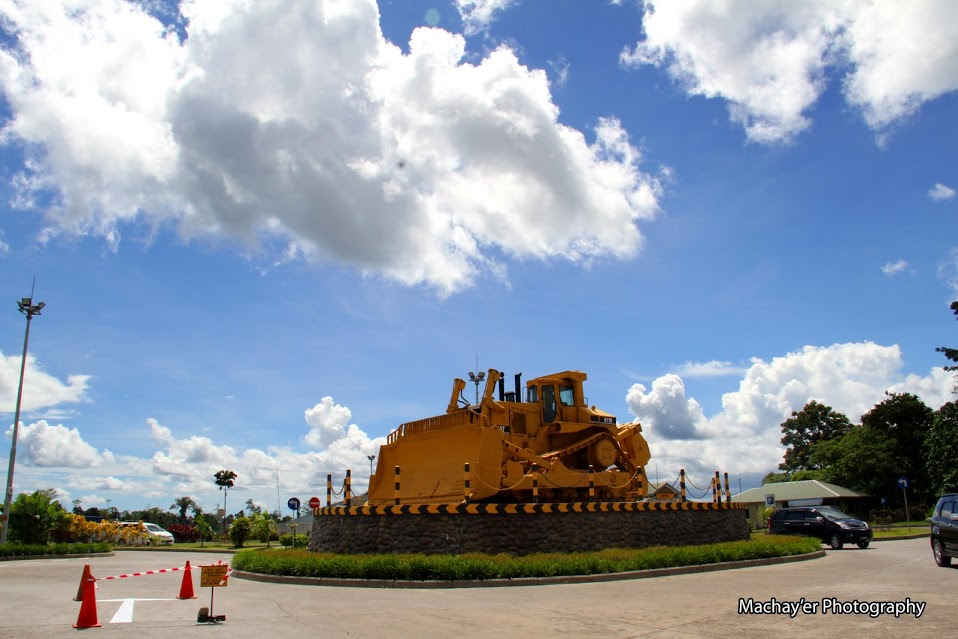
Parking area of the previous Airport operated by PT Freeport Indonesia

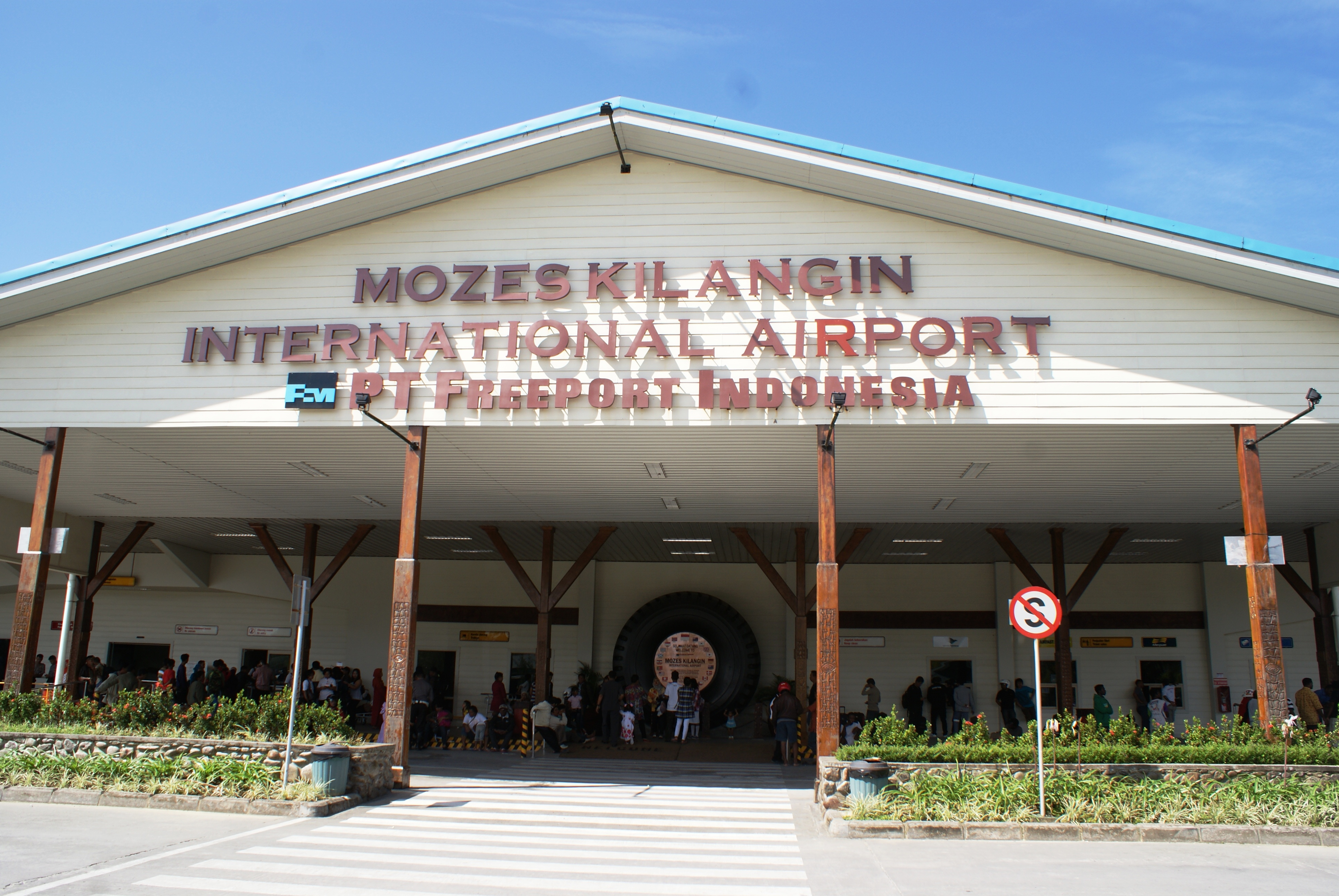
Previous Airport operated by PTFI
