= Mimika Regency =

Regency in Central Papua, Indonesia

Mimika Regency Kabupaten Mimika
- Regency
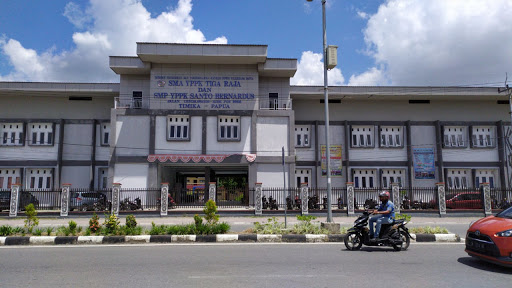
- A high school in Timika

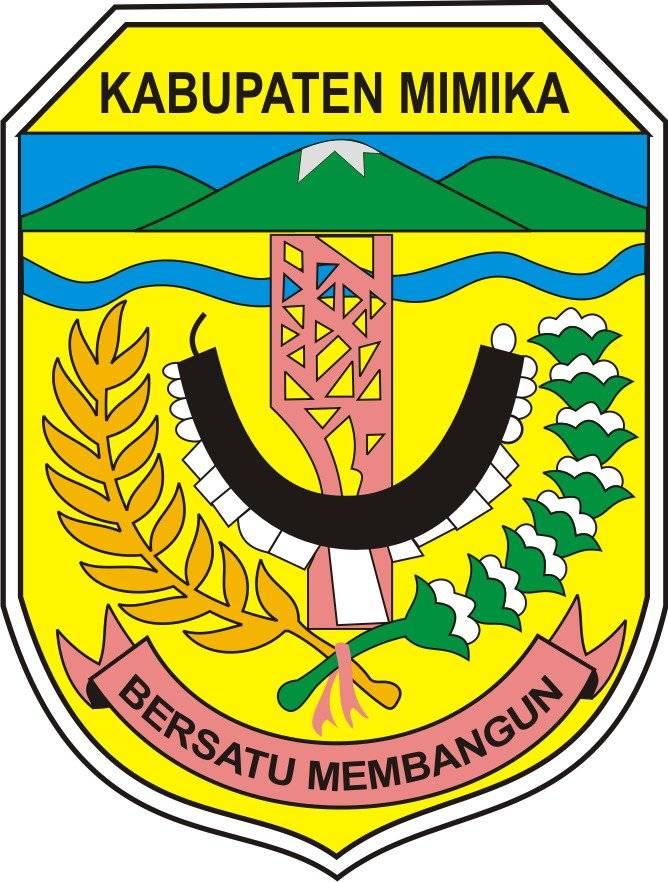
- Coat of arms
- Motto(s): Bersatu Membangun (Unite to Build)
- Location in Central Papua

- Location in Indonesian Papua Location in Indonesia
- Coordinates: 4.5436°S 136.5656°E
- Country: Indonesia
- Province: Central Papua
- Capital: Timika

Government
  - Regent: Johannes Rettob (PDI-P)
  - Vice Regent: Emanuel Kemong
  - Legislature: Mimika Regency House of Representatives

Area
  - Total: 21,693.51 km^{2} (8,375.91 sq mi)

Population (mid 2025 estimate)
  - Total: 320,839
  - Density: 14.7896/km^{2} (38.3050/sq mi)
- Time zone: UTC+9 (Indonesia Eastern Time)
- Area code: (+62) 901
- Website: mimikakab.go.id

Mimika Regency is one of the regencies (kabupaten) in the Indonesian province of Central Papua. It covers an area of 21,693.51 km^{2}, and had a population of 182,001 at the 2010 Census, which grew to 311,969 at the 2020 Census. The official estimate as of mid 2025 was 320,839 (comprising 168,793 males and 152,046 females). The administrative centre is the town of Timika, which lies within Mimika Baru District with 145,611 inhabitants in mid 2025.

The regency covers the entire south coast of its province (the only other coastal regency of Central Papua is Nabire Regency, covering the north coast of the province). The western half of this southern coastline, identified as "West Mimika" in the table below, forms the coastal access to the landlocked regencies to its north - Deiyai Regency and Dogiyai Regency. During the 2020s, Mimika was involved in a border dispute with neighboring Deiyai and Dogiyai regencies, resulting in the Kapiraya conflict.

== History ==
On 8 October 1996, the Minister of Home Affairs in Jayapura designated Mimika as an Administrative District. After being formed into an Administrative Regency, the District area was determined to consist of: Mimika Timur (East Mimika) District, Mimika Barat (West Mimika) District, Agimuga District, and the expansion area of Mimika Baru District which is domiciled in Timika. After approximately 4 (four) years of the implementation of the Administrative Regency administration, on 18 March 2000, the change of status from Administrative District to Definitive Regency was inaugurated by the Governor of Papua Province, Drs. JP Salossa, M.Si based on Law No.45 of 1999.

== Administrative districts ==
Mimika Regency in 2010 comprised twelve districts (distrik); by 2018 the number of districts had risen to eighteen, all of which are tabulated below with their populations at the 2010 Census and the 2020 Census, as well as the official estimates as of mid 2025. The table also includes the location of the district administrative centres, the number of administrative villages within each district (totaling 133 rural kampung and 19 urban kelurahan) within each district, and its postcode. This includes Distrik Mimika Barat Tengah (Central West Mimika District) with Indonesia's highest postal code of 99976.

Kode Wilayah	Name of District (distrik)	Area in km^{2}	Pop'n 2010 Census	Pop'n 2020 Census	Pop'n mid 2025 Estimate	District centre	No. of villages	Post code
94.04.11	Mimika Barat Jauh (Far West Mimika)	2,485.89	1,799	2,030	2,776	Potowai Buru	8	99974
94.04.12	Mimika Barat Tengah (Central West Mimika)	2,292.46	2,050	2,320	3,365	Kapiraya	9	99976
94.04.04	Mimika Barat (West Mimika)	1,187.85	3,952	2,966	2,892	Kokonau	7	99975
94.04.17	Amar	1,801.50	^{(a)}	2,045	2,623	Amar	6	99973
	Total West Mimika	7,767.70	7,801	9,361	11,656		30	
94.04.03	Mimika Timur (East Mimika)	290.48	8,900	10,179	11,769	Mapura Jaya	6 ^{(b)}	99962
94.04.08	Mimika Tengah (Central Mimika)	526.67	3,038	4,260	5,293	Atuka	5	99972
94.04.07	Mimika Timur Jauh (Far East Mimika)	2,035.36	2,995	3,520	4,352	Ayuka	5	99971
94.04.01	Mimika Baru	1,509.48	118,100	142,909	145,611	Timika Jaya	14 ^{(c)}	99952
94.04.14	Kwamki Narama	12.86	^{(d)}	13,750	13,968	Harapan	10 ^{(b)}	99951
94.04.15	Iwaka	492.73	^{(d)}	10,981	11,253	Ikake	7	99968
94.04.16	Wania	197.32	^{(d)}	58,904	64,819	Kamoro Jaya	7 ^{(e)}	99963
94.04.09	Kuala Kencana	860.74	18,290	27,774	31,922	Kuala Kencana	10 ^{(f)}	99969
94.04.10	Tembagapura	2,586.86	16,917	23,022	10,234	Tembagapura	14 ^{(b)}	99967
94.04.06	Jila	622.83	3,779	1,755	2,079	Jila	12	99961
94.04.18	Alama	365.92	^{(d)}	2,055	2,765	Alama	11	99966
94.04.14	Hoya	563.78	^{(d)}	1,097	1,567	Hoya	6	99960
94.04.02	Agimuga	2,198.56	822	876	1,359	Kiliarma	8	99964
94.04.05	Jita	1,962.37	1,361	1,526	2,192	Sempan Timur	10	99965
	Totals for Regency	21,693.51	182,001	311,969	320,839	Timika	152	

Note: (a) the 2010 population is included in the figure for Mimika Barat District, from which it was split off. (b) including one kelurahan - the District admin centre as named.
(c) comprising 11 kelurahan (Dingo Narama, Kebun Sirih, Koperapoka, Kwamki, Otomona, Pasar Sentral, Perintis, Sempan, Timika Indah, Timika Jaya and Wanagon) and 3 desa.
(d) the 2010 population is included in the figure for the district from which it was split off.
(e) comprising 3 kelurahan (Inauga, Kamoro Jaya and Wonosari Jaya) and 4 desa.
(f) including 2 kelurahan (Karang Senang and Kuala Kencana).
