= Germany–Papua New Guinea relations =

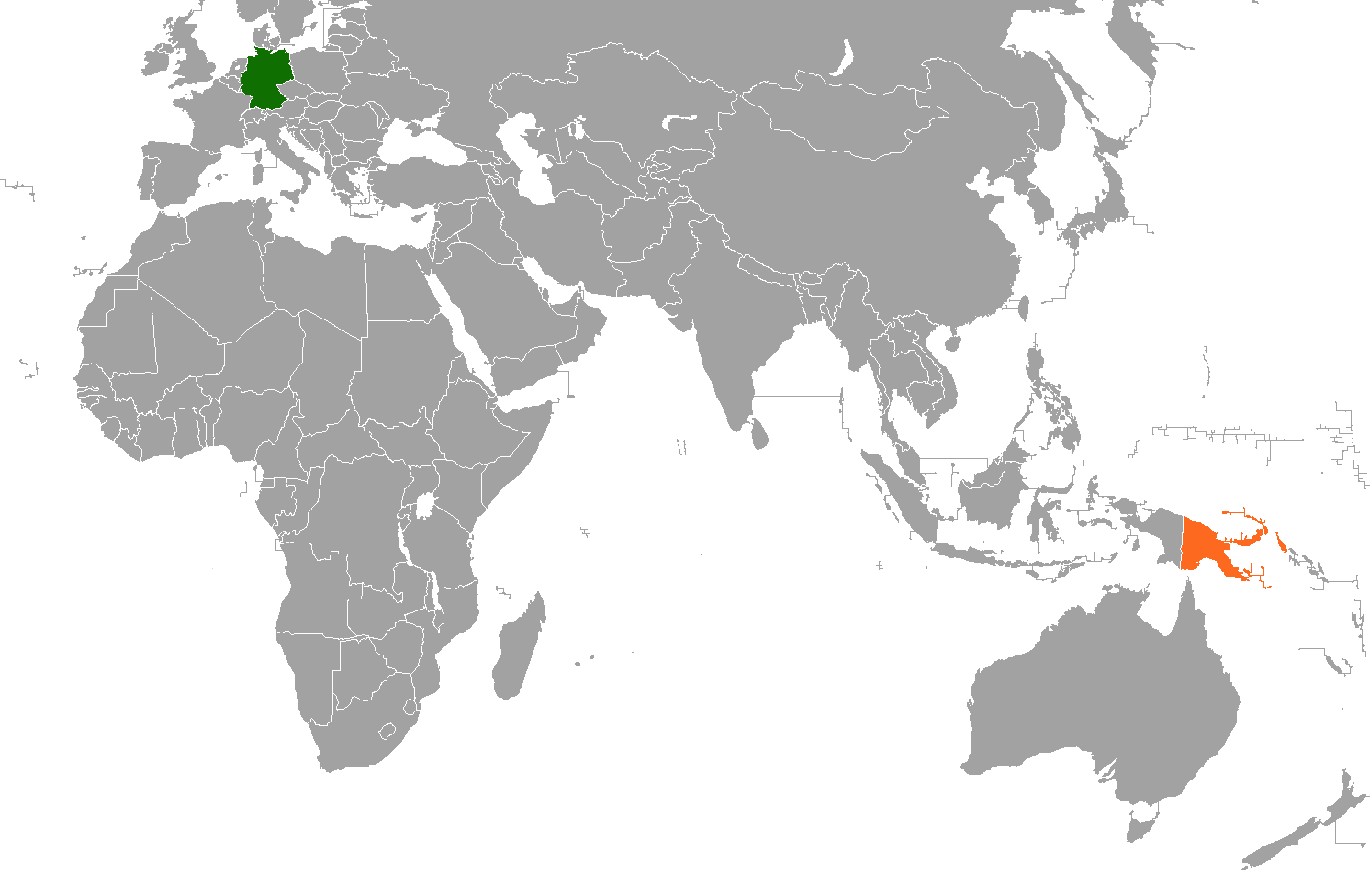

- Germany: Papua New Guinea

Germany–Papua New Guinea relations are the bilateral relations between Germany and Papua New Guinea. A historical connection between the two countries exists from the colonial era. Some areas of present-day Papua New Guinea were part of the colony of German New Guinea. One legacy of the colonial era is the language Unserdeutsch, the only German-based creole language in the world. Diplomatic relations were established in 1976 and are limited to occasional contact. There have been hardly any state visits. Diplomatic relations with Papua New Guinea are maintained by the German Embassy in Canberra, whose ambassador is also accredited to Port Moresby.

== History ==
The first Germans to reach the island of New Guinea are thought to have been seafarers from the Holy Roman Empire, including a captain from Jever, who were part of the crew of the Dutch explorer Abel Tasman when they reached the island in 1643. In the second half of the 19th century, German explorers such as Georg von Schleinitz traveled to New Guinea and German trading companies such as Hernsheim and Robertson established bases in the region. In 1878, the Prussian naval officer Bartholomäus von Werner acquired the ports of Mioko and Makada on the Duke of York Islands. The New Guinea Consortium was founded in Berlin by major financiers and bankers in 1882 for the purpose of acquiring colonies in the South Seas. The Consortium later became the New Guinea Company. In 1885, Finschhafen was established in what is now Morobe Province, where German missionaries soon settled. The Germans' activities in the vicinity of their continent concerned the Australians, and in 1896 Anglo-German agreements over the western Pacific were signed, which divided the West Pacific into spheres of influence. The German Empire received northeast New Guinea (Kaiser-Wilhelmsland), the Bismarck Archipelago and sine of the Solomon Islands, including the islands of Buka, Bougainville, Choiseul and Ysabel. Later, a few more islands were added like Palau, the Marshall Islands and Nauru. The southern part of East New Guinea, on the other hand, became British and the western part of the island remained Dutch.

German New Guinea in the Pacific (1914)

Due to the massive mismanagement of the territory by the New Guinea Company, the German Empire itself took control of New Guinea in 1899. With the takeover of administrative control, German New Guinea was divided into two administrative districts, one for the mainland and one for the islands. However, administering the colony proved to be a major challenge due to the great distance from the metropole. Communication was difficult, and the journey took almost 50 days by ship, which gave the colonial officials, who ruled indirectly through local and tribal structures, great freedom of decision-making. German settlers established plantations to grow copra, cocoa, rubber, coffee and tobacco, often with local, Indian or Chinese laborers, who suffered from a high mortality rate. Colonization was rarely economically viable, and profits tended to benefit a few trading companies, such as the Jaluit Company. German administrative sovereignty remained limited, and in some regions the Germans encountered resistance that had to be suppressed by force. The activities of German missionaries, who established German-language schools in the country, had longer-term influence on New Guinea's culture. During the colonial period, numerous German researchers also visited New Guinea and conducted anthropological studies that contributed to a better understanding of the region's great ethnic and linguistic complexity.

German rule over East New Guinea ended in 1914 with the beginning of the First World War, when Australian troops took the German possessions in New Guinea without much resistance. The Germans living there were expelled and some were interned in Australian camps. After that, East New Guinea remained under Australian administration (with a break during the Second World War) and the memory of German colonial rule faded over time. In post-war West Germany, the great cultural diversity of East New Guinea was occasionally the subject of media reports and exhibitions. In 1975, East New Guinea finally received its statehood as independent Papua New Guinea. On September 16, 1976, diplomatic relations with West Germany were established. In 1983, both countries signed a treaty on financial cooperation, which included loans and technical assistance for Papua New Guinea from Germany. A German parliamentary group visited Papua New Guinea for three days in 2019 and met with members of the government, business representatives and civil society.

== Economic relations ==
Trade relations between the two countries are not particularly intensive. German imports from Papua New Guinea in 2024 amounted to almost 220 million euros and German exports amounted to almost 18 million euros. Germany provides development aid to Papua New Guinea. This includes regional programs of the Gesellschaft für Internationale Zusammenarbeit (GIZ), the International Climate Initiative (IKI) and the European Union's Neighborhood, Development and International Cooperation Instrument (NDICI). The German Embassy in Canberra supports smaller projects in the country every year, mostly in the fields of education and health. There are also some state-sponsored church aid projects in the country.

== Cultural relations ==
Cultural relations between Germany and Papua New Guinea are historically shaped by the German colonial period. During this time, Germany left its mark on the language, religion, architecture and administration. Some German loanwords still exist in Tok Pisin, the unofficial lingua franca of the country. The language Unserdeutsch originated from a Catholic mission station of the Missionaries of the Sacred Heart (MSC) on New Britain, where mixed race children were taught in German, resulting in a unique Creole language. After independence from Australia, however, most speakers emigrated there and no longer passed the language on, making it a threatened language.
