= Jean Victor de Bruijn =

Dutch district officer, soldier, explorer

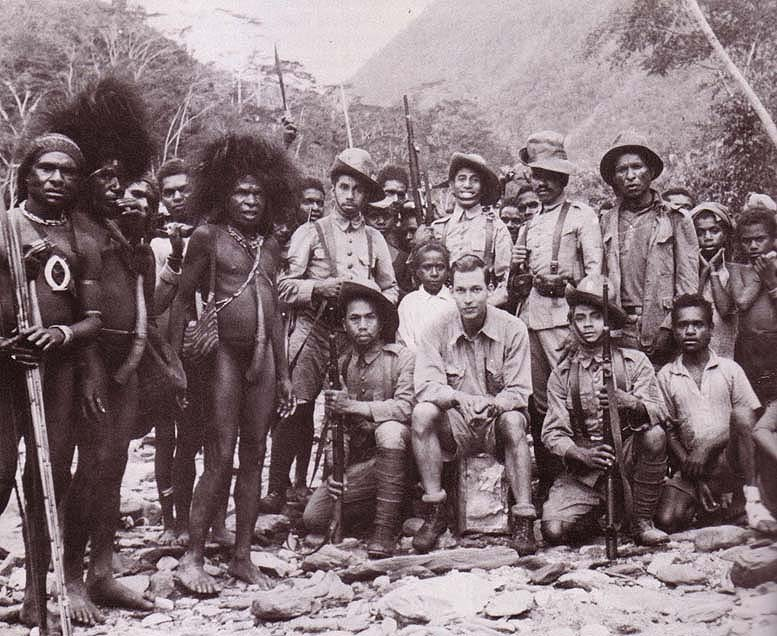
- De Bruijn, with Moluccan police and highland companions, on patrol east of Beoga, 1941

Assistant District Officer of Saparua Island
- In office 1938–1939

District Officer of New Guinea Highlands
- In office 1939–1943

District Officer of Biak Island
- In office 1946–1950

Personal details
- Born: 25 November 1913 Mertojoedan, near Magelang, Java, Dutch East Indies
- Died: 12 February 1979 (aged 65) Driebergen, Netherlands
- Parents: Gerard Rudolf Anton de Bruijn (father); Mathilda van Rossum (mother)
- Awards: Netherlands Cross of Merit; Netherland Bronze Cross; Order of Orange-Nassau; Honorary degree, University of Leiden

Military service
- Allegiance: Dutch Empire
- Branch/service: Royal Netherlands Army; Royal Netherlands East Indies Army
- Years of service: c. 1942–1944
- Battles/wars: World War II; Japanese occupation of the Dutch East Indies; Operation Oaktree

Jean Victor de Bruijn (25 November 1913 – 12 February 1979) was a Dutch district officer, soldier, explorer, ethnologist and writer. He spent most of his life in the Dutch East Indies, especially in Dutch New Guinea, working as a colonial administrator and an ethnologist. He gained fame for holding out with native Papuan soldiers in mountainous interior of Western New Guinea against overwhelming Japanese forces, as part of Operation Oaktree, maintaining one of the last Dutch-controlled outposts in the Dutch East Indies during World War II.

== Early life ==
Jean Victor de Bruijn, one of a family of eight children, was bom to Dutch parents with some distant Javanese ancestry at the sugar plantation of Mertojoedan, near Magelang, in Java. His father, Gerard de Bruijn, was the manager of the plantation. He went to the primary and secondary schools there and in Semarang. He wanted to work in the Dutch East Indies administration, which required mandatory courses in Indology, and in 1931 he registered at the University of Leiden, completing his classes in 1935. However, owing to the Great Depression, no further appointments in the colonial administration could be made there, and he had to face two years in the Netherlands on part salary but without occupation. In December 1937, after pursuing further studies directly at the University of Leiden, he left it with a degree of Doctor of literature and Philosophy.

== Early career ==
In January 1938, he came back to the Dutch East Indies. From Batavia, he was appointed Assistant district officer at Saparua in the Molucca Islands, where he remained for eight month, contributing to the construction of roads in order to open up the country. However he was very keen on going and working in New Guinea, and he had asked to be appointed there already back when he still was in the Netherlands. The recent discovery of the Wissel Lakes in December 1936, in the mountainous interior of the island, had made him all the more eager, but the authorities thought him to be far too young for the responsible nature of the work. Nonetheless, and unexpectedly, after only ten months in the service, de Bruijn got his opportunity as the Government became soon aware of his talents. In 1939 they sent him an urgent telegram to fly to Ambon, and from there proceed to take charge of the base at the newly discovered lakes. By that time the base at Enarotali comprised the District Officer and a doctor, a radio operator (both Indonesians), about twenty native police, 120 Papuan coolies, as well as twenty Javanese convicts and several Christian missionaries. He soon became greatly appreciated among the natives for his fair treatment of the population. He also made several trips to the interior along with botanists and ethnologists who came for the occasion.

== Second World War ==
Most of the Dutch East Indies were invaded by the Japanese in early 1942, soon followed in April 1942 by Dutch New Guinea, thus isolating the post from the coast. Enarotali still maintained contact with Merauke, the last remaining Dutch stronghold in the Dutch East Indies, and with Australia thanks to liaison seaplanes landing on the Paniai lake. Dutch and Australian governments considered evacuating the post, but De Bruijn was determined to stay there and fight the Japanese as well as gather intelligence, in what would be called Operation Oaktree. In July, he went to Australia to plead his case. It was agreed that he would be sent back to the highlands, with rifles and ammunition, but that no further help could be provided for the time being, since few planes were available. In November 1942, a plane set out from Merauke, bringing him back to Enarotali and the highlands.

When he came back to the highlands, he found out that with the absence of authority caused by his departure, the natives had been convinced by the Japanese to report directly to their headquarters in Fakfak, occupied since April 1942. The following month, in December, the Japanese sent two destroyers along the coast south of Enarotali, landing 450 marines at Timoeka near Kaukenau, and started to construct an airfield and a base. De bruijn raided the local police post at Oeta and disarmed the natives who had sided with the Japanese, then withdrew to the mountains. The Japanese, angered by his raid, sent several reconnaissance planes over the lakes. Owing to the sheer numerical superiority of the Japanese, De Bruijn decided on limiting himself to carrying on intelligence work about Japanese troop movements. In May 1943, he was made aware that a party of 60 Japanese were coming inland. At the end of May 1943, the Japanese, determined to occupy the lake regions in order to deny allied planes from landing on the Lake Paniai and catch De Bruijn, turned up at the lakes, only to realize that Enarotali had been burnt to the ground by de Bruijn and his men during their retreat to safety in the surrounding valleys. While in the valleys, thanks to papuans who had worked for the Japanese, he was able to provide precious information to the Netherlands East Indies Forces Intelligence Service about Japanese forces stationed at Ambon, Seran, Nabire and Timika. De Bruijn kept a low profile, gathering intelligence and using air drops supplies such as ammunition and rifles, training his men on how to shoot with rifle as well as calling airstrikes on Japanese positions at Enarotali. During early 1944, he started reinforcing his band of native papuans with rifles and military training, setting up ambushes against Japanese forces in the region, killing dozens of them. At the same time reports started coming in, saying that more and more Japanese troops were moving toward the mountains, fleeing from their strongholds on the northern coast at Hollandia and Sarmi, which had been invaded by the Americans. They understood that they were facing the risk of getting sandwiched between Japanese troops retreating from the north and the contingent based to the west at Enarotali. In July 1944, De Bruijn decided to evacuate, ending the operations in the highland region.

Over a two-year period, this guerrilla force raided and ambushed Japanese positions, pillaged supplies and destroyed ammunition dumps. Even though the highland lakes region was of little strategic value military speaking, it allowed the gathering of precious information on Japanese positions in the region, which would prove useful during the Western New Guinea campaign. Above all, it was essentially a symbolical victory, as de Bruijn was portrayed as the irreducible symbol of Dutch resistance in the Dutch East Indies by allied and Dutch propaganda, waving the flag and maintaining the prestige of the Dutch among the inhabitants of the area, just as Hermann Detzner had done in German New Guinea 20 years before, and who was a source of inspiration for De Bruijn. He was personally awarded the Netherlands Cross of Merit, the Netherlands Bronze Cross and the Order of Orange-Nassau by the Queen Wilhelmina.

== Post-war ==
Following his evacuation, he stayed for some time in an Australian hospital, being treated for malnutrition, and met his wife Geertje Botma there, also Dutch, who worked as a nurse. Thereafter he went back to New Guinea, to resume his work as the District Officer of Biak Island, between 1946 and 1950. Between 1952 and 1962, he worked in Hollandia, working as an administrative officer and the chief of the demographic bureau, also corresponding with Mary Rockefeller about the disappearance of her son near Agats in 1961, owing to his expertise on the people and the region. In 1963, after the handover of Western New Guinea to Indonesia, he left the island to work as the head of the Urbanisation Research Information Centre of the South Pacific Commission in Noumea, French Caledonia. Eventually in 1965, he came back to the Netherlands and became the head of the Central Office of the Royal Tropical Institute in Amsterdam, until his retirement in 1972.

In 1978 he published a book, called "Het verdwenen volk" (The Vanished Nation), one of the first of its kind about the issues relating to the handover of Western New Guinea to Indonesia, and the risks posed for the local cultures on the region, such as the "Indonesianization", which would be the trigger point of the Papua conflict opposing the Free Papua Movement and the Indonesian government.

He died on 12 February 1979, at the age of 65 in Driebergen, Netherlands.
