= Hermann Detzner =

German engineer and surveyor

Hermann Philipp Detzner
- Hermann Detzner, portrayed on the jacket of the 1921 edition of his book Four Years Among the Cannibals
- Born: 16 October 1882; Speyer, Bavaria, German Empire
- Died: 1 December 1970 (aged 88); Heidelberg, Baden-Württemberg, West Germany
- Military career
- Allegiance: German Empire
- Branch: Imperial German Army; Schutztruppe (Kamerun and German New Guinea)
- Service years: c. 1901–1919
- Rank: Major
- Units: 6th Infantry Regiment (Prussia); 2nd Pioneer Battalion
- Conflicts: World War I: Australian occupation of German New Guinea
- Awards: Iron Cross (1st Class); Honorary degree, University of Köln
- Other work: Engineer, topographer, explorer, government official, writer

Hermann Philipp Detzner (16 October 1882 – 1 December 1970) was a German engineer and surveyor, who served as an officer in the German colonial security force (Schutztruppe) in Kamerun (Cameroon) and German New Guinea. He gained fame for evading capture after Australian troops invaded German New Guinea at the start of World War I.

In early 1914, the German government sent Detzner to explore and chart central Kaiser-Wilhelmsland, the imperial protectorate on the island of New Guinea. When World War I broke out in Europe, he was far from civilisation and without radio contact. He refused to surrender to Australian troops when they occupied German New Guinea, concealing himself in the jungle with a band of approximately 20 soldiers. For four years, Detzner and his troops provocatively marched through the bush, singing "Watch on the Rhine" and flying the German Imperial flag. He led at least one expedition from the Huon Peninsula to the north coast, and a second by a mountain route, to attempt an escape to the neutral Dutch colony to the west. He explored areas of the New Guinea's hinterland formerly unseen by Europeans.

After finding out that the war had ended, Detzner surrendered in full dress uniform, flying the Imperial flag, to Australian forces in January 1919. He received a hero's welcome when he returned to Germany. He wrote a book about his adventures – Four Years Among the Cannibals in the Interior of German New Guinea under the Imperial Flag, from 1914 until the Armistice – that sold well in Great Britain and Germany, entered three printings, and was translated into French, English, Finnish and Swedish. He received a position in the Imperial Colonial Archives, and appeared frequently on the lecture circuit throughout the 1920s. In the late 1920s, scientific portions of his book were discredited. In 1932, he admitted that he had mixed fact and fiction and, after that time, eschewed public life.

== Family ==
Detzner was the son of a dentist, Johann Philipp Detzner and his wife, Wilhelmine Katharina Faber, in Speyer, in the Bavarian Palatinate, a cultural, economic, and historical city on the Rhine River. His father received his degree from Heidelberg University and was licensed to practise by the Kingdom of Bavaria in 1867; Detzner's father pioneered innovations in dental prosthetics. His large family included nine children. Hermann Detzner was trained as a topographer, surveyor, and an engineer, and received his promotion to Fahnrich in the 6 Infantry Regiment (Prussian), 2nd Pioneer Battalion, in February 1902. During World War I, military authorities transferred his commission to the 1st Bavarian Pioneer Battalion.

== Early explorations ==
Hermann Detzner participated in a joint British-German scientific and surveying expedition to Kamerun in 1908 and 1909 and again in 1912–1913. He and one Captain Nugent, Royal Artillery, identified and marked the frontiers of Kamerun and explored the Niger valley. Detzner later published a paper on the marking of the boundary.

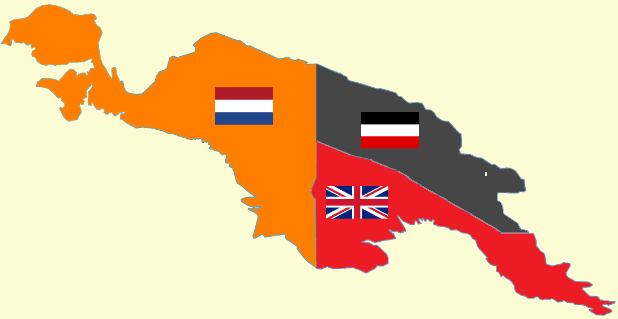
New Guinea in 1884–1919. The Netherlands controlled the western half of New Guinea and the territory remained neutral during World War I. Germany controlled the north-eastern part, which was invaded by the Australians at the outbreak of the war. Britain (later Australia after 1902) controlled the south-eastern part. The boundary between Papua (British protectorate) and Kaiser-Wilhelmsland (German protectorate) was in question.

Navigators charted the coastline of the northern and eastern portions of New Guinea in the early 17th century and, later in the century, British Admiralty navigators named the visible mountain ranges. Most German surveying efforts had focused on coastal regions and river basins, where Germans had established plantations, leaving the hinterland unexplored. In late 1913, the Imperial Colonial office appointed Detzner to lead an expedition to survey the border between the British protectorate, called Papua, and the German territory, called Kaiser-Wilhelmsland, and to survey and map unexplored inland regions.

Detzner's mission was also to be the first serious attempt to explore the hinterland and to evaluate and describe its resources. The boundary between Papua and Kaiser Wilhelmsland had been broadly established by a joint British-German expedition in 1909, but the terrain had not been mapped and the German colonial administration maintained that the boundary was imprecise. From the German perspective, an accurately defined boundary was essential to monitor and control the activities of Papuan gold prospectors near the border with German territory. Detzner had had experience in joint operations in Kamerun in 1907–08 and could be expected to understand the challenges faced by the previous commission; he had a reputation as a methodical and precise engineer. Although small, he was tough and wiry, extremely focused and determined, and seemed like the right man for the job.

== Adventures in New Guinea ==
In January 1914, Detzner travelled to Rabaul on New Pomerania (now New Britain). In February, he began his expedition into Kaiser-Wilhelmsland. His survey immediately revealed inaccuracies in the 1909 joint survey; by March, Detzner had concluded that the border corridor was already showing a discrepancy of more than 650 meters (2,133 ft) from the 8°0'S parallel. The discrepancy increased the further west he travelled, revealing a widening wedge in the boundary as it was agreed upon, and as it was marked. The discrepancy favoured German interests.

German hotel at Herbertshöhe (Kokopo) on New Pomerania, circa 1912. The small German colony in Herbertshöhe had capitulated to the Australian troops by mid-September 1914.

He had progressed well inland when, on 4 August 1914, Britain declared war on Germany. As World War I spread to the Pacific, Australian troops invaded German New Guinea, taking the German barracks in Herbertshöhe (Kokopo) and forcing the defending German colonial troops to capitulate on 21 September after their defeat at Bita Paka. At the beginning of October, he was still unaware of the state of war that now existed between his country and the Commonwealth.

The several months following the outbreak of war found Detzner on border survey work with his sergeant, Konradt, 25 police and 45 carriers, two servants and an interpreter in the high country between Mt Chapman, the Ono River, and Mt Lawson, that is to say along the territorial boundary between Australian-governed Papua and German New Guinea. Eventually he sighted people he named Rockpapua or "skirted Papuans' – these were Kamea people perhaps in the area south of Tekadu in the southernmost part of Morobe Province or the northern part of Gulf Province. On 11 November 1914, one of the carriers, left with several others to rest at a temporary camp, arrived bearing a note from Frederick Chisholm, an Australian Patrol Officer, informing him of the state of war between Germany and Great Britain and asking him to surrender at Nepa on the Lakekamu River, five days walk away.

=== Four years in the unexplored interior of New Guinea ===
Rather than comply, Detzner led his party on a forced march north to the Markham Valley. His route is uncertain, but his description of a valley with steep grassy ravines entering from east and west may place the latter part of his journey in the Langimar Valley, through which flows a tributary of the Watut River. A clash with local people that he describes, has been identified as having occurred at Rangama among with Middle Watut people. Once on the Watut itself, the party built rafts and floated downstream to the Markham.

His final destination was Sattelberg on the Huon peninsula. His second in command, Sergeant Konradt, who suffered from frequent bouts of malaria, and a German officer, were captured by the Australians by spring 1915. Eventually, Detzner found his way to the vicinity of a Lutheran mission at the Sattelberg, at a foggy, cool area at 800 meters (2,625 ft), above Finschhafen. The Sattelberg mission was one of the Neuendettelsau Mission Society enterprises established by the Old Lutheran missionary, Johann Flierl, in 1885. This station, and additional mission stations in Heldbach, Simbang, Tami Islands, and Simbu, were an important evangelical presence in the Morobe Province. The missionaries had signed oaths of neutrality for the Australians, who allowed them to remain at their Stations and continue their work.

Once Detzner reached the vicinity of the Sattelberg Mission, nearby villagers in the Borrum valley housed him and his remaining men, which had dwindled to about 20 soldiers, plus four European officers and, on his behalf, the villagers sought assistance from the Sattelberg director, Christian Keyser, and another missionary, Otto Thiele. They reluctantly agreed to keep Detzner's presence a secret. Among the villagers, Detzner established a base camp from which he could depart at short notice. The valley was relatively secure for him, and inaccessible for the Australians, but if they ventured too close to his base, Detzner and his men would retreat into the mountainous Saruwaged, or, if necessary, further into the Finisterre mountains. These were rugged and remote locations, accessible to Detzner, who had the help of native guides, but which the Australians, who usually travelled in larger patrols, could not penetrate.

Detzner and his band stayed near the Sattelberg Mission for the remainder of the war. After the war, however, Detzner would claim he had roamed throughout the eastern jungles of the island, eluding Australian patrols and making little effort to hide. He said he flew the Imperial German flag (sewn from dyed loincloths) in villages throughout the bush, and marched his command through the jungle, loudly singing such patriotic German songs as "Watch on the Rhine" (Die Wacht am Rhein) and popular sentimental ballads like Der Lindenbaum. The Australian garrison was probably not aware of Detzner's activities.

=== Escape attempts ===
Detzner could have made attempts to reach West New Guinea, which was then neutral Dutch New Guinea, but his claims to have been the first outsider to enter the Papua New Guinea highlands can be discounted. In 1915, and again in 1917, Detzner and some of his men tried to escape along the coast in two canoes. In 1917, they reached the vicinity of Friedrich-Wilhelmshafen, which today is Madang. There lay anchored the Australian ship, HMAS Una, which earlier had been the German imperial yacht, the SMS Komet, designated for use by the German governor of the colony. The ship blocked any further travel, and ended any notions they had of a water escape to Dutch New Guinea. On this escape attempt, Detzner also learned the Australians had orders to shoot him on sight. He made one further attempt to escape overland to Dutch New Guinea, but had to be carried back suffering from an internal hemorrhage. He spent the remainder of the time investigating the island's inhabitants and its flora and fauna, particularly in the Huon Peninsula and Huon Gulf.

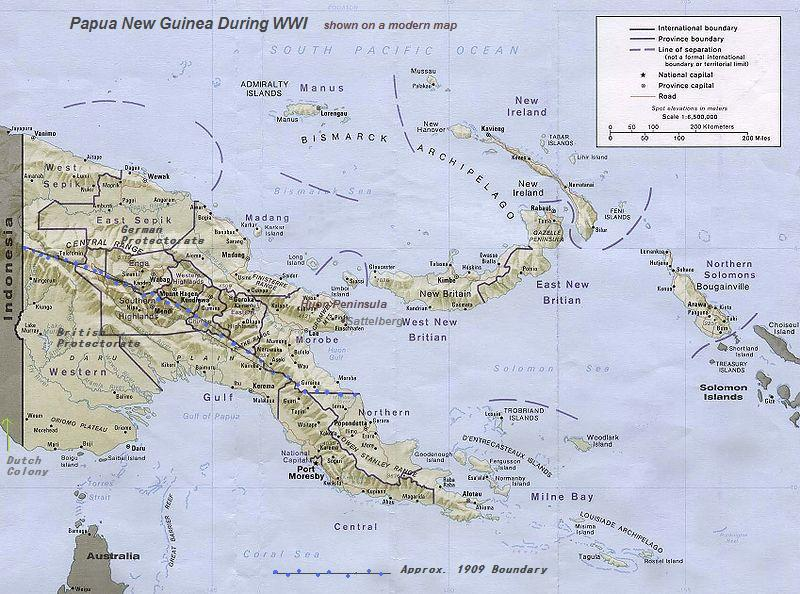
Hermann Detzner's location 1914–18 was the Huon Peninsula.

=== Surrender ===
On 11 November 1918, Detzner received the news of the official end of the war with the German defeat from a worker at the Sattelberg Mission Station, he wrote a letter to the Australian commander in Morobe in which he offered his capitulation. On 5 January 1919, he surrendered at the Finschhafen District headquarters, marching with his remaining German troops in a column, and wearing his carefully preserved full-dress uniform. He was brought to Rabaul, the Australian headquarters, and on 8 February 1919, was transferred to Sydney aboard the Melusia; after a brief internment in the prisoner of war camp at Holsworthy, he was repatriated to Germany.

== Book and honours ==
On his arrival home, Detzner received a hero's welcome. The press likened him to the successful commander of German East Africa, Major General Paul von Lettow-Vorbeck, who tied down British forces in Africa for the duration of the war. Detzner had been promoted to the rank of captain during the war; upon his return, he was promoted to major. In that year, he wrote Kaiser-Wilhelmsland, nach dem Stande der Forschung im Jahre 1919, (Kaiser-Wilhelmsland, According to the State of Research in the Year 1919), which was widely read in scientific circles.

The Geographical Society of Berlin (Gesellschaft für Erdkunde zu Berlin) honored him 1921 with the Nachtigal Medal "in Eisen" (iron), named after the German explorer Gustav Nachtigal, not in Gold, as sometimes reported. The Geographic Society of Leipzig (Gesellschaft für Erdkunde zu Leipzig) awarded him their Eduard-Vogel-Medaille in gold (Eduard Vogel) in the same year. The University of Köln granted him an honorary degree (Dr. phil. h. c.) on 31 July 1921, and the military awarded him the Iron Cross (2nd and 1st Class) together on 31 August 1919. He received a position in the colonial administration (Reichskolonialamt) in Berlin and in the imperial archive (Reichsarchiv) in Potsdam.

To satisfy the public curiosity about his adventures, Detzner wrote Four years among cannibals : New Guinea. The book brought him fame in Germany and Britain, and he became a sought-after speaker on the lecture circuit. In the 1920s, in addition to several articles and two maps of New Guinea, Detzner published a memoir of his adventures in the Niger valley—In the land of the Dju-Dju: travel experiences in the eastern watershed of the Niger—in 1923, but it did not achieve the popularity of his previous work.

=== Book reception ===
This pre-war German postcard from New Guinea depicts the exotic locale of the German protectorate. Widely distributed cards such as this, whether sold as post cards or in cigarette packages, often intensified interest in the colonial enterprise by offering an exciting and evocative visual image.

Detzner's book was wildly popular among the general population for its incredible tales of stubborn patriotism and its narratives describing the exotic locales of the lost imperial colonies. His descriptions touched a chord in the German imagination: one of their own had explored the colony, walked its paths, seen its mountains and valleys, and met its people. His vivid descriptions brought to life the images Germans had seen on postcards (such as the one to right), newspapers, and in school books. Furthermore, he had defended Germany's "place in the sun" when others had failed to do so. His book was translated into English, Finnish, Swedish and eventually French. (See below.)

In a speech at the Berlin Geographical Society in 1919, Detzner claimed that the natives of New Guinea had opposed Australian domination and resisted a military recruitment that amounted to slavery, that even the English plantation holders wished to remain independent of Australia, and that the natives were collecting money to build a war memorial for the Germans. The report on Detzner's speech, transmitted from a news agency in London, caused a small flutter in Australian government circles, but generally was dismissed; an earlier report by the Australian judiciary had absolved the Australian force of improper recruiting or treatment of the New Guineans. An angry letter to the editor from another Australian source, who claimed to have been in service in Morobe from 1914 to 1915, received little attention.

In the scientific world, several of his descriptive passages generated excitement and curiosity. In early 1914, he had been surveying a portion of the international boundary in the Upper Waria River between the German and British protectorates. By late September, he had passed into a different portion of the highlands, where the clay-slate mountains changed into limestone highlands. In this geologic transition, he said, he also found a change in the ethnographic character of the population, whom he described as a "new" people. They were stocky, powerfully built, and long–limbed; they wore their hair in knots on the centre of their heads, which were otherwise shaven, and painted yellow and black lines across their chests. They also wore grass skirts, so he called them the skirted ones. They used bows and arrows, slings and stone axes. As he pushed west to Mount Joseph, Detzner claimed, he had found the southern hills of the central watershed cut by numerous rivers flowing north to south. He had surmised that there were no insurmountable obstacles between him and the Sepik river. In 1917, he had travelled through the Ramu valley into the Bismarck range, northwest of the Kratke Mountains, and had continued on that route for 100 kilometres (62 mi). He also described the presence of an indigenous variation of German, called Unserdeutsch (our German), in several New Guinean dialects.

== Controversy ==
An illustration in Detzner's book depicted a characterization of the native New Guineans he encountered in his adventures; these were the people he called "the skirted ones".

In 1919, after an account of Detzner's speech in Berlin to the Geographical Society was published in Australia, an angry Australian wrote anonymously to the editor of The Argus, a Melbourne newspaper, and described what he claimed were Detzner's lies. "There was no mystery about the disappearance of Captain Detzner and his party", he claimed. The writer attributed Detzner's success at staying ahead of the Australians to the perfidy of the German missionaries, who had agreed to remain neutral and in return for such agreement were allowed to continue their mission work. Detzner was a civilian [emphasis in the original] surveyor, the writer claimed, not a soldier and he survived on mission station rations supplied by public subscription from the German plantation owners. Furthermore, this writer asserted, Detzner's movements were so well known to the district officer at Morobe that he was prevented from escaping; they could have shot him several times, but did not. The writer dismissed Detzner's claims about Australian recruitment of the natives as "in keeping with his dozens of other lying statements in all cases endeavoring to belittle Englishmen or British officers, in every case pure fabrications and typical scurrilous Hun lies".

While such criticism of Detzner's adventures might have been dismissed as post-bellum bellicosity, in 1929, Detzner's assertions came under more serious assault. Two of the German missionaries in the Finschhafen District, Christian Keyser (also spelled Kayser or Keysser) and Otto Thiele, claimed Detzner had not spent the war roaming the jungle, one step ahead of the Australians, but had been under the Mission's protection the entire time. Keyser's additional accusations were particularly specific: Detzner had appropriated his own scientific observations. Keyser's claims carried some weight. He had published a dictionary of the Kâte language, and was a reliable expert on New Guinean dialects, and the German-based creole languages that had arisen in New Guinea; he was also a bona fide explorer and adventurer, having lived from 1899 to 1920 among the mountain peoples of the island. In 1913, Keyser climbed the 4,121-meter (13,520 ft) Saruwaged Massif; over the course of his 21 years in New Guinea, he had identified hundreds of new plant and animal species, and had maintained a regular correspondence with the German Geographical Society in Berlin. Ernst Mayr, a rising star in ornithology, had heard about Detzner from Australians on a research trip to New Guinea. In Germany, during a meeting with Keyser, they discussed Detzner's claims, and Mayr lost no time in broadcasting the discrepancy to his scientific contacts in Europe and the United States.

More problematically, Detzner had no documentation of his findings. As he explained in his many speeches, although he had kept notebooks with drawings of plants, animals, maps, and people, and journals recounting his day-to-day experiences, some of his notebooks and journals had been destroyed by the Australians as they over-ran his hiding places; others, which he had buried to keep them from being destroyed, had rotted beyond repair in the jungle humidity. He implied that what remained of his notes had been confiscated when he surrendered. Detzner's narrative also was rife with contradictions and omissions: Detzner named few villages or streams and stated that the valleys he discovered were thinly populated, whereas they actually contained large populations, at least by New Guinea standards. He also stated that the highest point in the range was 3,600 meters (11,800 ft), a 1,200-meter (3,900 ft) miscalculation, which, for a mapmaker and a surveyor, needed to be explained.

Detzner made attempts to explain away specific ambiguities, contradictions, and errors. In 1915, he said, he lost his surveying instruments while eluding an Australian patrol, which explained why many of his assertions were vague and inconclusive, and his calculations inaccurate. This was true, the Australians did find a box of Detzner's equipment in the location where the missionary Johann Flierl's oldest son, Wilhelm, had kept (or stored) his small canoe. Although Wilhelm denied helping Detzner and his men, the Australians arrested him. The event coincided with one of Detzner's narrow escapes from Australian patrols in 1915 and was inadvertently corroborated in 1919 by the angry letter to The Argus's editor. Some of Detzner's assertions could be sustained through observable physical evidence: he had reportedly wasted to a mere 40 kilograms (88 lb) while roaming in the bush, which should not have happened, some supporters claimed, if he had indeed been under the protection of Keyser and Thiele. On the other hand, this weight loss could also have been due to his debilitating illness in 1917.

Despite his explanations, the missionaries Thiele and Keyser, whose own autobiography appeared in 1929, and the widely respected Mayr, who by this time had become the leader of the Whitney South Seas Expeditions, continued to challenge the bulk of Detzner's scientific "discoveries". Detzner's position became increasingly untenable. In 1932, he admitted that he had mixed fact and fiction in his book, explaining that he had never intended it to be taken as science, but rather at its face-value, as the story of his adventurous years in the jungles of New Guinea. The following year, Detzner resigned from the prestigious Geographical Society of Berlin.

I wish to state that my book, Vier Jahre unter Kannibalen, contains a number of misrepresentations regarding my journeys in New Guinea. The book in question is a scientific report in part only; it is primarily a fictional account of my experiences in New Guinea and owes its origin to the unusual circumstances prevailing in Germany at the time of my return. Some of the journeys I had actually undertaken are not described at all; on the other hand it contains passages that do not correspond with the facts.

After this, he withdrew entirely from public life, although he retained his position in the colonial archive. He lived in Schmargendorf, Berlin, on Auguste-Viktoria-Straße, and later became the director of the Carl-Pfeffer Verlag, a publishing house in Heidelberg. He died there in 1970, at the age of 88.

== Legacy ==
The ambiguous wording of Detzner's resignation from the Geographical Society of Berlin—the use of such phrases as contains misrepresentations, scientific report in part only, primarily fictional, unusual circumstances in Germany, and so on—misled later scholars, many of whom remained unaware of the controversy surrounding his book. Consequently, his work continued to inform the geographical, linguistic, and anthropological investigations of New Guinean culture and geography well into the 1950s and 1960s, much to the dismay of Ernst Mayr, who had been instrumental in discrediting Detzner in the 1920s.

Since the mid-1970s, references to Four Years Among the Cannibals have continued to appear in studies on New Guinea. In the 1990s, Detzner's work received some rehabilitation from ethnographer Terence Hays, who placed Detzner's work in its contemporary context: Four Years Among the Cannibals, he wrote, "paved the way for me [to become an ethnographer] by creating romanticized images that served as a backdrop for more serious readings". Since then, geographer Robert Linke has raised some important questions: "Why did Detzner resort to lies to embellish his wonderful story? The unadorned truth would have been enough to establish him as one of the great figures in New Guinea history." Detzner had remained at large for four years, as a fugitive in enemy-held territory: surely, Linke concluded, this was an exceptional feat. No doubt the Australians could have made a more broadly organized attempt to capture him, and probably would have succeeded, but they did not make the effort; they preferred instead the more convenient "shoot-at-sight" method. "It is impossible", Linke wrote, "not to admire his sheer elan, his courage and tenacity." In 2008, Detzner's book was retranslated, reprinted, and marketed as a modern translation of a rare and valuable book about the exploration of the New Guinean interior during World War I.

== Detzner's works ==
- (in German) "Kamerun-Boundary: Die nigerische Grenze von Kamerun zwischen Yola und dem Cross-Fluss". Mitteilungen aus den Deutschen Schutzgebieten. 26:13, pp. 317–338.
- (in German) "Der Saruwaged und seine östlichen und südöstlichen Anschlussgebiete". Kolonial Rundschau. Number 25 (1919) (Booklets, 8, 9, 10) pp. 209–221.
- (in German) "Kreuz- und Querzüge in Kaiser-Wilhelmsland während des Weltkrieges: Februar 1914 bis November 1918". Mitteilungen aus den Deutschen Schutzgebieten. Volume 32 (1919), pp. 4–19.
- (in German) Kaiser-Wilhelmsland, nach dem Stande der Forschung im Jahre 1919, with Max Moisel, Map. Berlin [Mittler], 1919.
- (in German) Vier Jahre unter Kannibalen. Von 1914 bis zum Waffenstillstand unter deutscher Flagge im unerforschten Innern von Neuguinea, Scherl, Berlin, 1920, 1921.

- (in English) Four Years among the Cannibals, from 1914 to the Armistice under the German Flag in unexplored interior of New Guinea. Berlin, August Scherl, [1921].
- (in Finnish) Neljä vuotta ihmissyöjien parissa: Saksan lipun suojassa Uuden-Guinean tutkimattomissa sisäosissa 1914–1918. Porvoo, WSOY, 1925.
- (in French) Mœurs et coutumes des Papous: quatre ans chez les cannibales de Nouvelle-Guinée (1914–1918) Avec une carte. Paris, Payot, 1923, 1935.
- (in Swedish) Fyra år bland kannibaler. Ani Mari Nordman, trans. Helsingfors, Schildt, 1925.
- (in English) Four Years Among the Cannibals ... Gisela Batt, (Trans.), Pacific Press, Gold Coast, Australia, 2008. (Retranslation and reprint).

- (in German) "Medizinische und hygienische Streiflichter aus dem Innern von Neuguinea". Archiv für Schiffs- und Tropen-Hygiene, Pathologie und Therapie exotischer Krankheiten. 1921, 25(3): pp. 67–79.
- (in German) Im Lande der Dju-Dju. Reiseerlebnisse im östlichen Stromgebiet des Niger, Scherl, Berlin 1923.
- (in German) "Stammesgemeinschaften im Zentralgebiet von Deutsch-Neuguinea". Mitteilungen aus den deutschen Schutzgebieten, Volume 36 (1928), pp. 112–130.
- (in German) "Unter Unbekannten Kannibalen", Die Woche, 24. 1. 1925, Nr. 4.
- (in German) Die Kolonien unter Mandatsherrschaft. Berlin, Deutscher Wille, 1927.
- (in German) Das "Zentralgebirge" Neuguineas im Gebiet der Wasserscheide zwischen Hüon- und Papua-Golf. Map. Mitteilungen aus den deutschen Schutzgebieten, Kt. 3 im 2. Heft, Bd. XXXVI, 1928.
