= Operation Oaktree =

Dutch World War II military operation in New Guinea

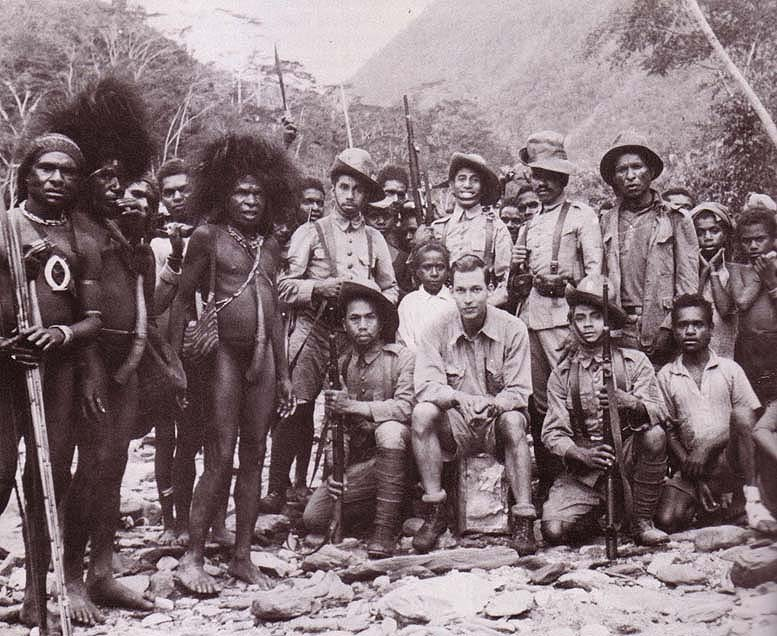
Jean Victor de Bruijn and Moluccan KNIL soldiers taking a photograph with native Papuans in Dutch New Guinea, 1943

Operation Oaktree was a Dutch military operation in Dutch New Guinea during World War II. Under the command of Captain Jean Victor de Bruijn, some 40 soldiers operated in the highland region of Western New Guinea for more than two years between December 1942 and July 1944, handled by the Netherlands East Indies Forces Intelligence Service, with Australian assistance.

== Background ==
The Wissel Lakes region was not known outside New Guinea until 1937. In order to assert Dutch control over the area, a Christian mission and a radio-equipped government post were established at Enarotali in May 1938.

Most of the Dutch East Indies were invaded by the Japanese in early 1942, followed in April 1942 by Dutch New Guinea, thus isolating the post from the coast. Enarotali maintained contacts, albeit loose ones, with Merauke, the last remaining Dutch stronghold in the Dutch East Indies, and with Australia due to liaison seaplanes landing on Paniai lake.

Dutch and Australian governments considered evacuating the post, but its district officer, Jean Victor de Bruijn, was determined to stay and fight in order to keep the little of the Dutch East Indies that remained. In July de Bruijn went to Australia to plead his case. At that time, all the planes in Australia were required either by General Douglas MacArthur or the Australian government to fight in Eastern New Guinea and the Solomon Islands. This made it impossible for de Bruijn to receive reinforcement. It was agreed that he would return to the highlands with rifles and ammunition, but that no further help could be immediately provided. On the morning of 5 November 1942, a plane flew him from Merauke to Enarotali.

== Operation ==
When de Bruijn came back to the highlands, he found out that because of his departure, the natives had been convinced by the Japanese to report directly to their headquarters in Fakfak, which they had occupied in April 1942. The following month, in December, he was made aware that the Japanese had sent two destroyers along the coast south of Enarotali. He managed to reach the coast, raid the village of Oeta and disarm the sleeping Papuan policemen who had sided with the Japanese. While interrogating the natives, he discovered that the Japanese had landed 450 marines at Timoeka near Kaukenau, who were constructing an airfield and a base there. He and his men withdrew from the coast and headed for the mountains, while destroying bridges along the way to slow the Japanese.

De Bruijn did not know until he reached the post that the Japanese, angered by his raid on Oeta, had sent Zero fighters and floatplanes on reconnaissance flights over the lake in order to show their awareness of his presence there. Owing to Japanese's sheer numerical superiority, de Bruijn decided to limit his operations to intelligence work on Japanese troop movements. However, in early 1943, Japanese reconnaissance aircraft were making long passes over the lakes, often flying below 150 feet, taking photographs for a planned occupation. On 11 May a mountain Papuan brought in a report indicating that a party of 60 Japanese were coming inland. A few days later, a plane with Rear-Admiral Pieter Koenraad on board, Commander-in-Chief of the Royal Netherlands Navy in Australia, landed on the lake. Koenraad pressed him to evacuate, but de Bruijn was determined to stay.

On 26 May 1943 the Japanese reached the lakes, only to realize that Enarotali had been torched by de Bruijn and his men during their retreat to safety in the surrounding valleys. While there, de Bruijn met with Stefanus Joseph, a young Papuan who had guided the Japanese and escaped as soon as they reached the lake. The previous year he had been convinced by the Japanese to go to Fakfak, and was disgusted by what he had seen there. Joseph provided important information about Japanese forces stationed at Ambon, Seran, and Timika. De Bruijn subsequently radioed the Netherlands East Indies Forces Intelligence Service HQ in Australia, which started realizing the importance of his mission in the highlands. Further information about the Japanese airfield at Nabire was also provided. It soon became obvious that the Japanese were staying and intended to guard the lakes in case any plane should attempt a landing on Lake Paniai. De Bruijn kept a low profile, gathering intelligence and using airdrops of supplies such as ammunition and rifles, while training his men on how to shoot. De Bruijn also called on his HQ to bomb Japanese positions at Enarotali to impress the natives, who were bribed by the Japanese to collaborate with them. From August 1943 onward, the Japanese post was frequently bombarded. In September 1943 an armed band of 400 Papuan natives, angered by Japanese exactions who had mistreated or killed neighbouring villagers, attacked Enarotali with bows and arrows but were repelled by the soldiers' superior firepower, leaving 6 Papuans killed. From then on the Japanese would not go out on patrol unless fully armed.

The Oaktree party was now getting stronger, fortified by new radio sets, food, rifles, and military training, reaching about 40 men strong, who were based at Bilorai. It was agreed that they would try to ambush Japanese parties along the trail from the coast to the lakes, which the Japanese had felt safe to use until then. However, the Japanese struck first, forcing them to pull back from Bilorai. One day, east of Bilorai, the Japanese were ambushed during their sleep by a patrol of two Indonesians and five Papuans, killing fifteen with Thompson submachine guns and hand grenades. At the same time, native observers reported that more and more Japanese troops were moving toward the mountains, fleeing from their strongholds on the northern coast at Hollandia and Sarmi, which had been invaded by the Americans. To avoid becoming trapped between Japanese troops retreating from the north and those to the west at Enarotali, an evacuation call was made. On the morning of 26 July 1944, a Catalina met them on Hagers lake, ending the mission.

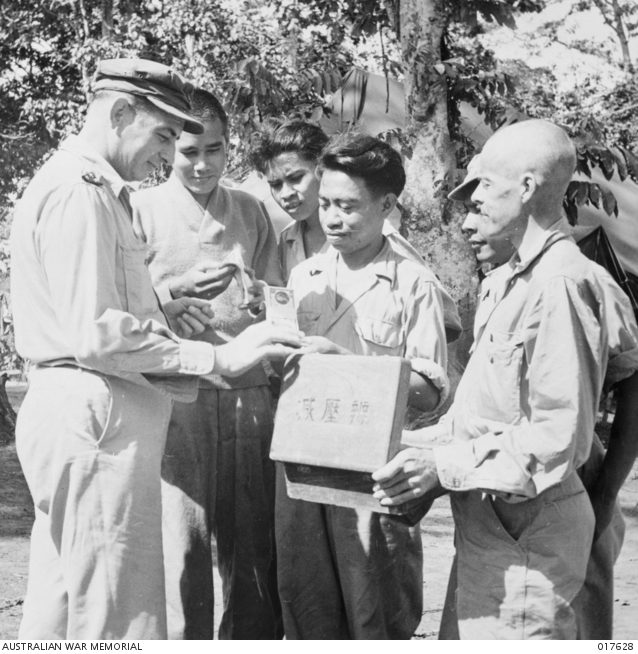
Members of the guerrilla force Oaktree being interviewed by a Dutch KNIL officer, September 1944

== Aftermath ==
Over a two-year period, this guerilla force raided and ambushed Japanese positions, pillaged supplies and destroyed ammunition dumps, killing more than 30 Japanese soldiers in the process. Although they managed to divert some Japanese forces and destroy their supplies, the highland lakes region was of little military importance. Nevertheless, it did allow the gathering of information on Japanese positions at Nabire, Timika, Fakfak and further west at Ambon, which proved useful during the Western New Guinea campaign. It was essentially a symbolic victory, as de Bruijn was portrayed as the irreducible symbol of Dutch resistance in the Dutch East Indies by allied and Dutch propaganda, waving the flag and maintaining the prestige of the Dutch among the inhabitants of the area, just as Hermann Detzner had done in German New Guinea 20 years before, and who was a source of inspiration for de Bruijn. Queen Wilhelmina personally awarded him the Netherlands Cross of Merit, the Netherlands Bronze Cross and the Order of Orange-Nassau. Among the Dutch, he was the exception rather than the rule, and their prestige was seriously damaged by the Japanese occupation, which led to the Indonesian war of independence and the subsequent Dutch withdrawal from the country in 1949. However, Western New Guinea was spared by the fighting, as the Dutch still enjoyed popularity among the native population, and remained in their hands until 1962, before its transfer to Indonesia the following year.
