= WABT =

WABT may refer to:

- Enarotali Airport, Indonesia (ICAO code: WABT)
- WVPO (FM), a radio station (96.7 FM) licensed to Lehman Township, Pennsylvania, which held the call sign WABT from 2012 to 2023
- WTMM-FM, a radio station (104.5 FM) licensed to Mechanicville, New York, which held the call sign WABT from 1999 to 2006
- WAWY, a radio station (103.9 FM) licensed to Dundee, Illinois, which held the call sign WABT from 1989 to 1996
- WUMP, a radio station (730 FM) licensed to Madison, Alabama, which held the call sign WABT from 1982 to 1985
- WZTN, a radio station (89.9 FM) licensed to Cornersville, Tennessee, which held the call sign WABT from 1979 to 1982
- WVTM-TV, a television station (channel 13 digital/7 virtual) licensed to Birmingham, Alabama, which held the call sign WABT from 1953 to 1958
- WACQ, a radio station (580 FM) licensed to Tuskegee, Alabama, which held the call sign WABT at its sign on in 1952
