= Operation Crayfish =

Operation Crayfish was a World War II operation by the Netherlands East Indies Forces Intelligence Service. In February 1944 they parachuted a special forces team into the Bilorai area of Japanese-occupied Dutch New Guinea for a sustained land undertaking to organise local resistance elements. It was part of the larger Operation Oaktree.
