= Kaiser-Wilhelmsland =

Northeast part of New Guinea

Kaiser Wilhelms Land
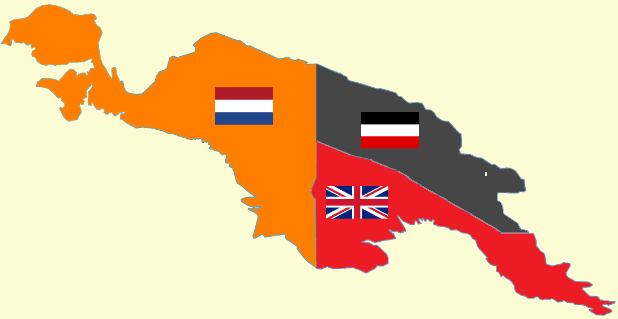
- Kaiser-Wilhelmsland (in black) 1884–1919

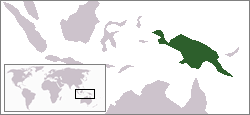

Geography
- Location: Northeastern quarter of the island of New Guinea, north of the Australian continent
- Coordinates: 6°50′S 146°40′E
- Area: 181,650 km^{2} (70,140 sq mi)
- Highest elevation: 4,121 m (13520 ft)
- Highest point: Saruwaged Massif 6°18′39″S 147°05′27″E

Administration
- Germany

Demographics
- Population: 110,000 (1902)

Kaiser-Wilhelmsland ("Emperor William's Land") formed part of German New Guinea (German: Deutsch-Neuguinea), the South Pacific protectorate of the German Empire. Named in honour of Wilhelm I, who reigned as German Emperor (Kaiser) from 1871 to 1888, it included the northern part of present-day Papua New Guinea. From 1884 until 1920 the territory was a protectorate (Schutzgebiet) of the German Empire. Kaiser-Wilhelmsland, the Bismarck Archipelago (including New Mecklenburg and New Pomerania), the northern Solomon Islands, the Caroline Islands, Palau, Nauru, the Northern Mariana Islands, and the Marshall Islands comprised German New Guinea.

Most of the German settlers in Kaiser-Wilhelmsland worked as plantation owners, miners, or government functionaries; the number of European settlers, including non-Germans, was never very high. In 1885, Lutheran and Catholic congregations sent clergy to establish missions; they experienced moderate, but very slow, success with the indigenous peoples. Missionaries and plantation owners alike were limited by tropical diseases and by travel and communication barriers.

The Germans never fully explored the protectorate, though in 1914 the Imperial German Government mounted an expedition to explore and map the interior. Lutheran missionaries were frequently the first Europeans to explore the interior and to examine the different fauna and flora.

Following the outbreak of World War I in July 1914, Australian troops quickly overran the German protectorate (September to November, 1914) and it came under Australian military administration. In accordance with the settlements ending World War I, from 1920 the Commonwealth of Australia, a British dominion, administered Kaiser-Wilhelmsland as part of the Territory of New Guinea, a League of Nations mandate.

== History ==
Flag of the German New Guinea Company (1885–1899)

The coastline of the northern and eastern portions of New Guinea had been charted by navigators in the early 17th century, and the visible mountain ranges named by British admiralty navigators later in the century. Most German surveying efforts had focused on coastal regions and river basins, where Germans had established plantations. The boundary between Papua and Kaiser Wilhelmsland had been established by a joint British-German expedition in 1909; the interior had not been mapped. Since then, Papuan gold prospectors had crossed into German territory which, from the German perspective, made the accuracy of the border essential.

=== 1870–1880 ===
In the 1870s and 1880s German commercial firms began to site trading stations in New Guinea. Agents of J. C. Godeffroy & Sohn reached the Bismarck Archipelago from the Caroline Islands in 1872. In 1875 Hernsheim & Company moved to the Archipelago.

=== 1880–1900 ===
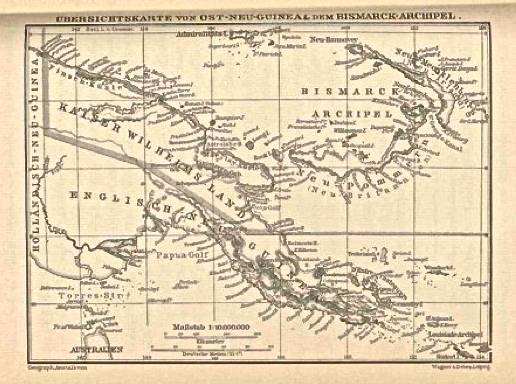
Map of Kaiser Wilhelms-Land and Ost Neu Guinea

In 1884, the German New Guinea Company was founded in Berlin by Adolph von Hansemann and a syndicate of German bankers for the purpose of colonising and exploiting resources on Neu Guinea (German New Guinea), where German interest grew after British Queensland's annexation of part of eastern New Guinea. This expedition was with the knowledge and blessing of the German Chancellor, Count Otto von Bismarck, and with secrecy and speed an expedition was fitted out under Dr Otto Finsch, ornithologist and explorer.

His task was to select land for plantation development on the north-east coast of New Guinea and establish trading posts. Its influence soon grew to encompass the entire north-eastern part of New Guinea and some of the islands off the coast.

The Neuguinea Compagnie expedition left Sydney for New Guinea in the steamer Samoa captained by Eduard Dallmann. On 19 August, Chancellor Bismarck ordered the establishment of a German protectorate in the New Britain Archipelago and north-eastern New Guinea.

In 1885 and 1887, Johann Flierl established missionary stations in Simbang and Timba Island. After malaria epidemics in 1889 and again in 1891 killed almost half of the European settlers on the coast in Finschhafen, many of the Europeans moved toward Friedrich Wilhelmshafen (now Madang). Flierl established a Mission station at the Sattelberg, 700 metres (2,297 ft) in the highlands. In 1890 and 1891, he built the Sattelberg Mission Station there and constructed a road approximately 24 kilometres (15 mi) between the station and the Finsch harbour (Finschhafen), which cut the travelling time from three days to five hours.

German colonial rule in New Guinea lasted for a period of thirty years, For the first fifteen years the colony was administered under imperial charters by a private company, in the manner of the old British and Dutch East India Company, but with far less success. From 1899 to 1914, the Imperial Government administered German New Guinea through a governor, who was assisted after 1904 by a nominated Government Council.

When the imperial government took over the running of the colony in 1899, its over-riding objective was rapid economic development, based on a German-controlled plantation economy.

=== 1900–1914 ===
In April 1911, Dr Wegener, director of the Meteorological Observatory in Apia, stated he was on his way to German New Guinea, to make preliminary arrangements for a series of journeys by balloon across the mainland, the purpose of which was to make aerial surveys.

In late 1913, the Imperial Colonial Office appointed Hermann Detzner to lead an expedition to survey the border between the Australian territory of Papua, and the German territory and to survey and map the interior. Detzner was a military surveyor.

The expedition set off along the Langimar-Watut divide, and travelled by raft down the Watut River to its junction with the Markham River, and on to the Lutheran Mission station at Gabmadzung (near the Lae Nadzab Airport).

=== 1914–1918 ===
German hotel at Herbertshöhe (Kokopo) on New Pomerania, circa 1912. The small German colony in Herbertshöhe capitulated to the Australian troops by mid-September 1914.

On 4 August 1914, Britain declared war on Germany. As World War I spread to the Pacific, Australian troops invaded German New Guinea, taking the German barracks in Herbertshöhe (present day Kokopo) and forcing the defending German colonial troops to capitulate on 21 September after their defeat at Bita Paka.

On 6 August 1914, residents of the Protectorate were notified by proclamation that a state of war existed between Germany, and England, France and Russia. During this time Detzner continued surveying and avoiding allied forces.

On 11 November 1918, Detzner was advised that the war had ended and surrendered himself at Finschafen complete with sword and sun helmet. He was interned at Sydney and returned to Germany.

=== 1920–1945 ===
In 1918, Kaiser Wilhelmsland and the other territories that comprised German New Guinea (New Pomerania and the islands of the Bismarck Archipelago) were administered by the Commonwealth of Australia. Beginning in 1920, Australia, under a mandate from the League of Nations, governed the former German territory of New Guinea. It was administered under this mandate until the Japanese invasion in December 1941. Most of the territory of New Guinea, including the islands of Bougainville, and New Britain, was occupied by Japanese forces before recapture during the final months of the war in the Australian-American New Guinea campaign.

== Natural features ==
Quaternary glaciers created much of the topography of Kaiser-Wilhelmsland. Recent studies suggest Mount Wilhelm held approximately 65 square kilometres (25 sq mi) of glacial ice. Further north, closer to the Equator, the glaciers left behind large rubble fields.

The territory of Kaiser-Wilhelmsland was largely mountainous, with Mount Wilhelm 4,509 metres (14,793 ft) the highest peak of the Hagan Range, which separated the protectorate from the British Papua. There are several major rivers, notably the Sepik River 1,126 kilometres (700 mi) which drops from the Highlands and winds through lowland swamp plains to the north coast.

The Markham River flows 180 kilometres (112 mi) from the Finisterre Range and ends in the Huon Gulf. The Huon Peninsula, named for the French explorer Jean-Michel Huon de Kermadec, has raised beaches, usually created by the combination of tectonic coastal uplift and quaternary sea-level fluctuations. The Saruwaged massif, with its twin peaks of Bangeta and Saruwaged, dominate the Saruwaged Range; rugged and steep, the massif reaches 4,000 metres (13,123 ft), and is surrounded by jungles at its base.

== Indigenous population ==
Near Mount Hagen, archaeologists have identified the Kuk Swamp (5°47′1.36″S 144°19′54.2″E), one of the oldest agricultural drainage sites in Australasia; the site has been identified as a UNESCO site, and is on the list of recommended World Heritage sites.

Linguistic features suggest the origins of the population. Along the southeast coast and in the Markham Valley, the Austronesia family of languages predominate. The two main languages were Kâte and Yabim, with Kâte spoken in the mountainous hinterlands and Yabim on the coastal areas, particularly on coast of the Huon Peninsula. The Non-Austronesian languages are heard most commonly in the mountain regions.

== See also ==
- Prefecture Apostolic of Kaiserwilhelmsland
- Dutch New Guinea
- Unserdeutsch language
