= Simbang, Morobe =

Village in Papua-New Guinea

Simbang
- Location within Papua New Guinea
- Coordinates: 6°35′S 147°49′E
- Country: Papua New Guinea
- Province: Morobe Province
- Time zone: UTC+10 (AEST)
- Climate: Af

Simbang is a village and a ward on the Huon Peninsula, in Yabim Mape Rural LLG, Morobe Province, Papua New Guinea.

In 1886, the first Lutheran mission station was built near Simbang by Johann Flierl. So Simbang was the starting point of Christianization in Papua New Guinea.
