= Apostolic Prefecture of Kaiserwilhelmsland =

Roman Catholic missionary in Papua New Guinea

The Prefecture Apostolic of Kaiserwilhelmsland (Latin: Praefectura Apostolica ???) was a missionary jurisdiction of the Roman Catholic Church in the late Nineteenth and early Twentieth Century Church, based in Alexishafen and Madang in what is now Papua New Guinea.

The first Catholic missionaries arrived in August 1896. The Apostolic prefecture was established and transferred to the Society of the Divine Word. At least twelve mission stations were established along the northern coast by 1910. The priests noted the difficulty of working with the wide range of local languages: at St. Michael's school in Alexishafen, among about 120 pupils in 1910, twenty-five different languages were spoken.
