= Johann Flierl =

German Lutheran missionary (1858–1947)

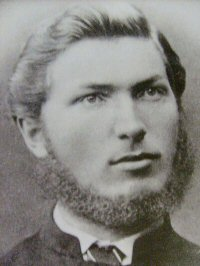
- April 1878
- Born: 16 April 1858; Kingdom of Bavaria
- Died: 30 September 1947 (aged 89); Neuendettelsau Mission Station, Finschhafen Province, New Guinea
- Education: Missionary Seminary of Neuendettelsau, Franconia
- Spouse: Beate Maria Louise Auricht
- Children: Wilhelm, Johannes, Dora, Elise
- Parent(s): f: Johann Konrad Flierl m: Kunigunda, née Dannhauser
- Church: Lutheran Neuendettelsau Mission Society, South Australian Synod
- Ordained: 21 April 1878
- Writings: Forty Years in New Guinea (Chicago, 1927) See list of publications
- Congregations served: Assistant, Bethesda Mission Station, Australia 1878–85; Founder, Elim Mission, North Queensland, Australia, 1885–86; Founder/Director, Simbang Mission Station, near Finschhafen, New Guinea (Kaiser-Wilhelmsland) 1886–1930; Founder/Director, Sattelberg Mission Station, Finschhafen District, New Guinea 1892–1900, Malahang Mission Station

Johann Flierl (16 April 1858 – 30 September 1947) was a pioneer Lutheran missionary in New Guinea. He established mission schools and organised the construction of roads and communication between otherwise remote interior locations. Under his leadership, Lutheran evangelicalism flourished in New Guinea. He founded the Evangelical Lutheran Mission in the Sattelberg, and a string of filial stations on the northeastern coast of New Guinea including the Malahang Mission Station.

He was educated at the mission seminary in Neuendettelsau, in the Kingdom of Bavaria. Prior to finishing his education, the Neuendettelsau Missionary Society sent him to the Bethesda mission, near Hahndorf, in South Australia, where he joined an Old Lutheran community. While there, he felt called to serve in the newly established German protectorate, Kaiser-Wilhelmsland. On the journey to New Guinea, he founded the Hope Vale Mission Station in Cooktown, Queensland, in Australia.

In Kaiser-Wilhelmsland, he established a lasting Lutheran presence at the missionary stations of Simbang, near Finschhafen, another on Tami, and a third, on the Sattelberg in the Huon Peninsula, plus several filial mission stations along the coast of the present-day Morobe province.

== Early life and education ==
Johann Flierl was born in rural Germany, in Buchhof, a tiny farmstead (with three houses), near Fürnied, in the vicinity of Sulzbach, in the Oberpfalz, Kingdom of Bavaria. He had at least two sisters. At age thirteen, when he finished his studies at the local primary school, his father apprenticed him to a blacksmith, but changed his mind when he discovered that his son would have to work on Sundays. Because Flierl had hoped since his early youth to serve as a missionary to the North American Indians, his father tried to send him to the seminary in Neuendettelsau, but was told his son needed to be 17 years old before he could enroll in the program. For four years, Flierl worked on his father's farm and continued his education informally; he also learned to knit and reportedly he could knit a sock in a day. He finally enrolled in the seminary in 1875; when he was half through the program, he heard about an opportunity for mission work in a mission founded by Old Lutherans and, after his consecration in April 1878, left for Australia.

== Mission in Australia ==
Flierl spent his first seven years of missionary life working on Lutheran Killalpaninna Mission (Bethesda) Station at Cooper Creek (1878–1885). In 1882, he married Louise Auricht, whose Old Lutheran family had immigrated from Prussia to Australia in 1839. Early in 1885, he heard about the founding of a German colony in New Guinea. On his journey there, he was delayed for more than a year in Cooktown, Cape Bedford, North Queensland; the German New Guinea Company refused him passage. While the diplomats and bureaucrats argued over technicalities, he founded the Mission Station Elim, (later called Hope Vale, sometimes Hope Valley, but is modern Hopevale) to serve the Guugu Yimidhirr.

== Connection to Neuendettelsau Mission Society ==
Flierl was a pioneer missionary for Southern Australian Lutheran Synod and the Neuendettelsau Mission Society. The synod and the mission society combined post-Reformation Lutheran conviction with 19th-century Pietism, and sought to bring the "undiluted conviction" of the historical Lutheran confession to Australia and New Guinea. The German colony in Australia, similar to the German Lutheran colony in Missouri in the United States, had left Prussia in 1838 and the 1840s to escape "unionism," the movement toward uniformity of organisation and worship imposed upon them by the state. Wilhelm Löhe, a pastor at Neuendettelsau in Germany, brought a similar ideology to the Neuendettelsau Mission Society, even refusing to co-operate with the Barmen or Basel missionary societies, for example, because such co-operation would dilute "pure doctrine" by a sinful "unionism" with congregation that complied with state uniformity. The mission society provided clergy and religious education for Lutheran settlements in Missouri, Iowa, and Ohio, Australia, and anywhere else "free thinking" Lutherans had settled.

Despite his childhood and youth in a "unionist" parish (and one in which Catholics and all Protestants shared ecclesiastical facilities), Flierl came to mission work in New Guinea with a similar mind-set to Löhe's, formed by his education at Neuendettelsau seminary and his experience among the so-called Old Lutherans in southern Australia. When he arrived in early July 1886, he established clear boundaries between his work and that of the business and official community; although they maintained respectful relationships, he sought to establish a mission that was true to the Word of God and untainted by "unionism" and collaboration between the church and the state.

He and his first colleague, Karl Tremel (also spelled Treml), established the mission near Simbang, in October 1886. Initially they lived in tents. With the help of some Australian Wesleyans (Methodists) they had recruited in New Pomerania, they later created a small compound of a few houses, a school, and a church. Another German missionary, Georg Bamler, joined them in 1887; the three men struggled with deadly diseases, primarily dysentery and malaria with its associated complications, and their discouragingly slow progress with the Kâte people. Despite these problems, Flierl started a second station on Tami, which lies in the Huon Gulf seven nautical miles (13 km; 8.1 mi) SSE of Finschhafen, in 1889; it progressed with equally limited progress. New missionaries joined them: Johann Decker, Georg Pfalzer, Konrad Vetter (died in 1906), Johann Ruppert (who died of typhoid in 1894), Friedrich Held (who died of blackwater fever), and Andreas Zwanger.

In 1889–1891, a particularly bad malaria epidemic wiped out almost half the European population on the coast; even Finschhafen itself was largely abandoned when the German New Guinea Company moved its operations to Stephensort (now Madang). Louise Flierl arrived later in 1889, but told her husband she would not stay unless he found a healthier place to live than the mosquito-infested delta lands around Simbang; upon further exploration, he identified a promising site at 700 metres (2,297 ft) in the highlands. In 1890, he built the Sattelberg Mission Station there and constructed a road approximately 24 kilometres (15 mi) between the station and the Finschharbor (Finschhafen), which cut the travelling time from three days to five hours.

=== New Guinea stations ===
Flierl's old policy at Simbang, and the one that prevailed at Sattelberg, focused on education and called for preliminary language study and literacy development so that the people could study the Bible, a fundamental precept of post-Reformation thought. The Kâte adults seemed more interested in the practical aspects of European life, particularly the ironware. The local communities, though, were curious and frequently ascribed the presence of the missionaries to returning ancestors, benevolent spirit powers bearing material goods, and called them the Miti. To the Kâte, these men were different from the land-hungry planters, who rarely left the confines of their plantations; missionaries, on the other hand, were friendly, willing to explore the interior, and interested in knowing the people, their language, and their countryside. In part, the variation in attitudes of the commercial and official interests, geographically located on the coast, and the evangelical attitudes, primarily located inland, but with supply, cultural and language links to the coast, is called by historians of colonialism "the rule of colonial difference." The "rule of difference" explains the ways in which colonizers, and the colonised, legitimate policy and reaction. Primarily it focuses on the ways in which the Europeans justify their own actions, how they view the "colonized" and how they structure policy.

Two groups of Germans inhabited Kaiser-Wilhelmsland. By far the largest group were the entrepreneurs, plantation owners, officials of the German New Guinea company, and government functionaries living in Finschhafen and Madang and at plantations along the coast. They viewed the Kâte and the other groups they encountered differently from the evangelical Lutherans at Finschhafen and Sattelberg and their filial mission stations along the coast. For the businessmen and functionaries, the natives were another resource to be managed: for example, as rail tracks were laid along the coast, the products were loaded on to rail cars and pushed or pulled from point to point using human energy, rather than propelled by steam. Official visitors, both German and British, noted that the German plantation owners in particular were far more likely to use the lash than other groups.

This was unacceptable for Flierl. Although the Kâte were indeed different, and some groups occasionally ate their enemies, he still saw them as children of God. For him, it was necessary to bring all children of God to the understanding of salvation. The first baptisms—those of two adult men—were performed in 1899, injected encouragement into the mission life. Personal acceptance of salvation was a fundamental precept of Lutheranism, and the instruction of the two men in Lutheran doctrine had preceded the baptism, although the work was slow and painstaking. Flierl petitioned the synod in Australia frequently for new missionaries, and in 1899, it sent Christian Keyser, who, it turned out, offered the spark needed for the great breakthrough in 1905.

Keyser understood better than Flierl the corporatist outlook of the Kâte people, and identified ways to bring them closer to the Word, primarily because he grasped a central feature of Guinean life that Flierl never understood: the Kâte could not conceive of themselves as autonomous individuals. Kâte concepts of self were woven inseparably into the context of extended families, clans, and ancestors. Consequently, the Kâte could not come individually to Christ — to do so would place one outside all social and cultural relationships—but rather, they had to come as a group. Keyser invented the method of group conversion, resulting in the first group baptisms in 1903, and mass conversions in 1905 and 1906.

Recognizing that his own usefulness in the Sattelberg had ended, in 1904, Flierl handed the directorship to Keyser, and moved himself and his family—which now included four children—to Heldsbach, 5.8 kilometres (4 mi) away on the coast. There, he started a commercial coconut plantation and acquired the mission's first large vessel, The Bavaria, in 1907. He also took an extended trip to Europe, Australia, and the United States, extending his contacts outside of Germany, and developing the mission's financial resources.

=== Mission under Australian occupation ===
The outbreak of World War I in 1914 complicated life for the German missionaries in the Finschhafen district, as it did the businessmen and government functionaires. The German population there had never been substantial. In 1902, fewer than 25 Europeans lived on the northeastern coast. By 1914, the number was still low, perhaps 300 in all of German New Guinea and 50 of them in Kaiser-Wilhelmsland, mostly plantation owners and their families, and a couple of dozen missionaries and their own families.

Australian troops invaded German New Guinea, taking the German barracks in Herbertshöhe (now Kokopo) in New Pomerania (now New Britain). The German defeat at Bita Paka in September 1914, and their subsequent surrender, brought effective resistance to an end. The missionaries in all stations signed neutrality oaths, required by the Australian administrators, and were permitted to continue their work. The two missionaries running the Neuendettelsau station on the Sattelberg, Otto Thiele and Christian Keysser, seemingly turned a blind eye to the presence of the pesky Hermann Detzner, a regular army officer stranded on a survey mission in the interior at the outbreak of war; Detzner refused to surrender to Australian authorities and spent the duration of the war annoying the Australians by marching from village to village in the jungle, flying the imperial flag, and singing patriotic songs.

During the war, Flierl also relied more on the connection between Lutheran churchmen in Australia and the United States, which he had nurtured carefully throughout the pre-war years. He did this by sending artefacts and letters to like-minded Lutherans; some of these artefacts are collected in a museum at the Wartburg Theological Seminary in Iowa, which also awarded Flierl an honorary degree. These new relationships were particularly important to maintain streams of personnel and supplies and became even more critical during the difficult post-war diplomatic and political dynamic of the Versailles Treaty negotiations. Potential territorial changes made it possible that the missions would be expropriated by Australians and the British and probable that their staffs would be expelled from their homes.

The war also wrought havoc on Flierl's family. The oldest boy, Wilhelm, was arrested in 1915, after two German officers (probably Detzner and another man) appropriated a vessel in an attempt to escape from New Guinea; their gear did not fit into the canoe, and they left behind a box, which caused the Australians to accuse Wilhelm of collaboration. He was incarcerated in Australia, and after the war he was repatriated to Germany. He eventually made his way back to New Guinea, via Texas, in 1927. Flierl's youngest son, Hans (or Johann), went to Germany in 1914 to attend the Neuendettelsau Seminary in Franconia, and instead was conscripted into the German army; after the war, he also went to Texas, and eventually returned to New Guinea.

== Later years and family ==
Flierl's four children were also involved in the mission. Wilhelm and Johannes both attended the Neuendettelsau Seminary and were ordained as mission pastors. Wilhelm took an interest in the local dialect, and wrote a dictionary of the Kâte language. Dora was a mission teacher and nurse; she remained single. Elise married Georg Pilhofer, another Lutheran missionary, who wrote a history of the Neuendettelsau Mission in New Guinea. Two of Flierl's cousins also entered the missionary field. Konrad Flierl was only 13 when his older cousin left for Australia, and he entered the Neuendettelsau preparatory program the following year. He was sent as a missionary to the United States in 1885. Another cousin, Johannes, also went to the Neuendettelsau Seminary, and replaced his cousin at Cooper Creek in 1886; after a disagreement with the mission and the local synod, he left Australia.

== Last years and death ==
Flierl retired in 1930, age 72, and returned with his wife to her hometown in Australia. After her death in 1934, he lived with his daughter, Dora; he died in there on 30 September 1947.

== Partial list of publications ==
- (in German) Gedenkblatt der Neuendettelsauer Heidenmission in Queensland und Neu-Guinea, Tanunda, Südaustralien: Selbstverl., 1909
- (in German) Wie ich Missioner wurde, 1909 (1928).
- (in German) Gedenken der Neuendettelsauer Mission, 1909 (1910).
- (in German) Im Busch verirrt, Neuendettelsau Verl. d. Missionshauses, 1910.
- (in German) 30 Jahren als Missionenarbeiter, 1910.
- (in German) Wie ich Missionar wurde und meinen Weg nach Australien und Deutsch-Neuguinea fand Neuendettelsau, Verl. d. Missionshauses, 1919, 4. Aufl.
- (in English) Forty-five years in New Guinea, Chicago 1927
- (in German) Was Gott auf Neuguinea in mehr als vier Jahrzehnten getan hat und was Gott von den Christen in der Heimat erwartet. Neuendettelsau : Verl. d. Missionshauses, 1928
- (in German) Gottes Wort in den Urwäldern v. Neuguinea, 1929.
- (in German) Von einem alten Australier: Gottes Wort in den Urwäldern von Neuguinea. Gesellschaft für Innere und Äussere Mission im Sinne der Lutherischen Kirche: Neuendettelsauer Missionsschriften, Nr. 62. Neuendettelsau, Verlag d. Missionshauses 1929.
- (in German) Ein Ehrendenkmal für die ehrwürdigen heimgegangenen Väter der luth. Kirche in Australien: Ueber die Toten nur Gutes! Tanunda : Selbstverl., 1929
- (in German) Wunder der göttlichen gnade. Evangelisten aus menschenfressern! 1931.
- (in English) Christ in New Guinea. Tanunda, South Australia, Auricht’s printing office, 1932.
- (in German) Als erster Missionar in Neuguinea. Neuendettelsau : Freimund-Verl., 1936
- (in German) Ein dankbarer Rückblick und ein hoffnungsvoller Ausblick auch in schwersten Zeiten, Tanunda:"Neu Guinea Haus", 1936
- (in German) Zum Jubiläum der Lutherischen Mission in Neu-Guinea. Tanunda, Südaustralien, 1936
- (in English) Observations and experiences, Tanunda, South Australia: Auricht, 1937, 5. ed.
- (in German) 60 Jahre im Missionsdienst, Neuendettelsau Freimund-Verl., 1938

Also:

- (in German) Als Pioniermissionar in das ferne Neu Guinea. Johann Flierls Lebenserinnerungen, with a commentary ed. by Susanne Froehlich. Part I: 1858--1886, Part II: 1886--1941 (Quellen und Forschungen zur Südsee A.5), Wiesbaden: Harrassowitz 2015.
- (in English) My Life and God's Mission. An autobiography. Transl. and ed. by Erich Flierl. – Adelaide: Board for Church Cooperation in World Mission. Lutheran Church of Australia, 1999. (Extracts from the German original, published now by Harrassowitz.)
- (in German) Ein Leben (collected works). Traugott Farnbacher und Gernot Fugmann (Hrsg.). Neuendettelsau 2008.

== Sources ==
- Garrett, John, Footsteps in the Sea: Christianity in Oceania to World War II. Institute of Pacific Studies/World Council of Churches, 1992; ISBN 978-982-02-0068-5, pp 1–15.
- Linke, Robert The influence of German surveying on the development of New Guinea, Shaping the Change: XXIII FIG Congress, Munich, Germany, 8–13 October 2006, pp. 1–17
- Pröve, H.F.W. “Auricht, Johann Christian (1832–1907),” Australian Dictionary of Biography, Online Edition, 2006, updated continuously, ISSN 1833-7538, published by Australian National University.
- Sack, P.G. “Flierl, Johann (1858–1947),” Australian Dictionary of Biography, Online Edition, 2006, updated continuously, Australian National University; ISSN 1833-7538
- Steinmetz, George, "The Devil's Handwriting: Precolonial Discourse, Ethnographic Acuity, and Cross-Identification in German Colonialism," Comparative Studies in Society and History, Vol. 45, No. 1 (Jan. 2003), pp. 41–95.

=== Additional material ===
- (in German) Johann Flierl: ein Leben für die Mission – Mission für das Leben. (biography). Neuendettelsau : Erlanger Verl. für Mission und Ökumene, 2008
- E. A. Jericho, Seedtime and Harvest, Brisb 1961.
- (in German) Neue Deutsche Biographie, vol 7 Berlin, 1966.
