= Enarotali =

- Town
- Location in Central Papua Location in Indonesian Papua Location in Indonesia
- Coordinates: 3°55′47″S 136°22′40″E
- Country: Indonesia
- Province: Central Papua
- Regency: Paniai Regency
- Climate: Cfb

Enarotali is a town in Paniai Regency, Central Papua, Indonesia. It is located on the shore of Lake Paniai, in Western New Guinea highlands.

== History ==
Enarotali is considered to be the only colonial city founded by the Dutch in the interior of New Guinea before World War II. The Wissel Lakes area was not known outside New Guinea until 1937. In order to assert Dutch control over the area, a Christian mission and a radio-equipped government post were established there in May 1938.

In April 1942, Dutch New Guinea was invaded by the Japanese, thus isolating the post from the coast, although it was resupplied by seaplanes from time to time. The Dutch maintained a small force there under code-named Operation Oaktree, made up of Papuan natives led by Jean Victor de Bruijn, harassing Japanese troops based on the coast at Timoeka near Kaukenau, where the Japanese had established an airfield in December 1942. With the objective of stopping those raids and preventing eventual allied reinforcements in the highland lake regions, the Japanese occupied the village in May 1943, although it had been preventively burnt to the ground by de Bruijn and his men. De Bruijn then withdrew to the surrounding valleys, harassing the Japanese forces occupying the lakes and gathering precious intelligence on Japanese troops in Western New Guinea, until his evacuation from the region in July 1944. At the end of the war in late 1945, Dutch colonial administration control was restored over the area, until it was transferred to Indonesia in May 1963 along with the rest of Western New Guinea.

=== 2014 Massacre ===
On 8 December 2014 the Indonesian army would open fire on a crowd of around 1,000 people protesting the severe beating of a group of young teens earlier that day, killing five and injuring 17.

== Geography ==
It is located in the Highlands, on the shore of Lake Paniai. Its altitude is about 1750 m, located near a fertile mountain plain surrounding the lake and it is surrounded by hills and mountains. It is served by the Enarotali Airport. It is the capital of Paniai Regency, Central Papua province. The city is at present developing towards Mahdi, located 12 km to the east.

== Climate ==
Enarotali has a subtropical highland climate (Cfb) with heavy rainfall year-round.

Climate data for Enarolati (2005–2020)
Month	Jan	Feb	Mar	Apr	May	Jun	Jul	Aug	Sep	Oct	Nov	Dec	Year
Mean daily maximum °C (°F)	22.8 (73.0)	23.2 (73.8)	23.5 (74.3)	24.3 (75.7)	24.1 (75.4)	23.3 (73.9)	23.1 (73.6)	22.9 (73.2)	23.2 (73.8)	23.9 (75.0)	23.9 (75.0)	23.7 (74.7)	23.5 (74.3)
Mean daily minimum °C (°F)	15.8 (60.4)	15.5 (59.9)	15.2 (59.4)	15.3 (59.5)	15.8 (60.4)	16.0 (60.8)	15.1 (59.2)	15.1 (59.2)	15.1 (59.2)	15.1 (59.2)	15.7 (60.3)	15.6 (60.1)	15.4 (59.8)
Average precipitation mm (inches)	137.6 (5.42)	172.0 (6.77)	235.5 (9.27)	226.3 (8.91)	223.2 (8.79)	237.0 (9.33)	329.4 (12.97)	262.3 (10.33)	285.8 (11.25)	220.2 (8.67)	201.2 (7.92)	230.7 (9.08)	2,761.2 (108.71)
Average precipitation days	12.3	12.8	16.9	16.9	16.9	16.8	18.8	18.8	18.7	15.4	15.1	18.1	197.5
Source: Meteomanz

== Population ==
The population of the Paniai Regency was 170.193 in 2017, however most of them didn't live in the regency capital, but in the countryside. The main tribes are Mee, Moni, Wolani and Dani. The former three tribes speak the Paniai Lakes languages, which is a language family named after the lakes. They depend on agriculture, including the cultivation of sweet potato and breeding livestock.
