= Tami Islands =

Coordinates: 6°46′S 147°55′E

The Tami Islands are a small island group located 13 km SSE of Finschhafen in the Huon Gulf (see also Solomon Sea). It is part of today's Morobe Province, Papua New Guinea.

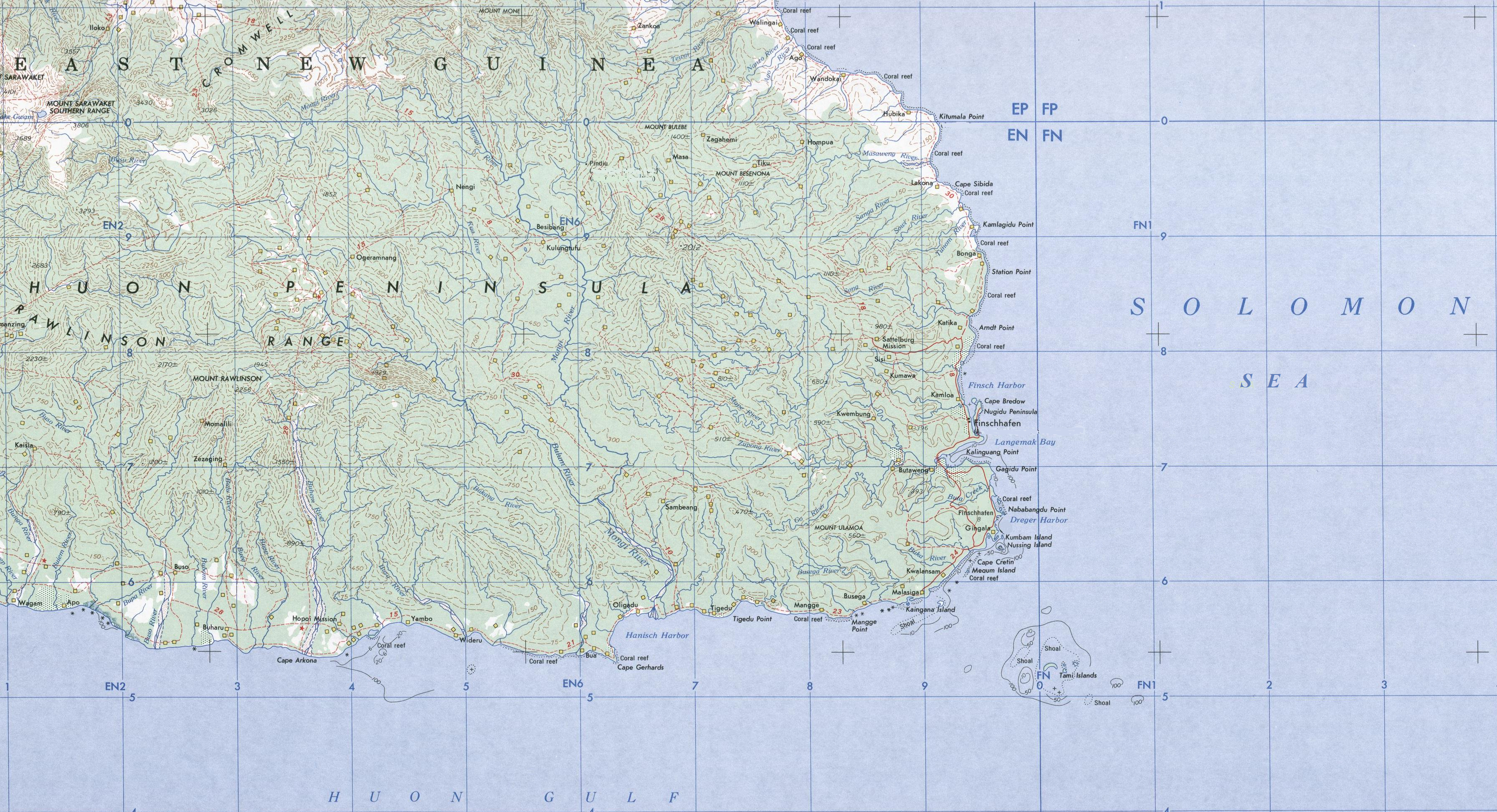
Tami Islands, off the Huon Peninsula, Papua New Guinea

Its people were known throughout the Solomon and South Sea islands for their distinctive wooden bowls, their religious figure carvings, and their ceremonial masks. During World War II, the islands were briefly occupied by the Japanese; Tami Islands were secured after the landings and Nassau Bay, Lae and Nadzab.

== Geography ==
The Tami Islands include four atolls, two of which are very small, and one so small it is not much larger than a strip of sand. On the two largest islands there are two villages that face each other across a volcanic cove. The islands form a circle around a lagoon, which at its center is 21 metres (69 ft) deep. The cove attracts snorkelers and divers who explore the reefs, including day-trippers from nearby Lae, on the main island of Papua New Guinea. The reefs contain Spanish Dancer jellyfish, Blue See Stars and varieties of colorful Pelagic fish, both predators and prey. At its widest, the largest island is not more than about 80 metres (262 ft) across.

== Regional trade ==
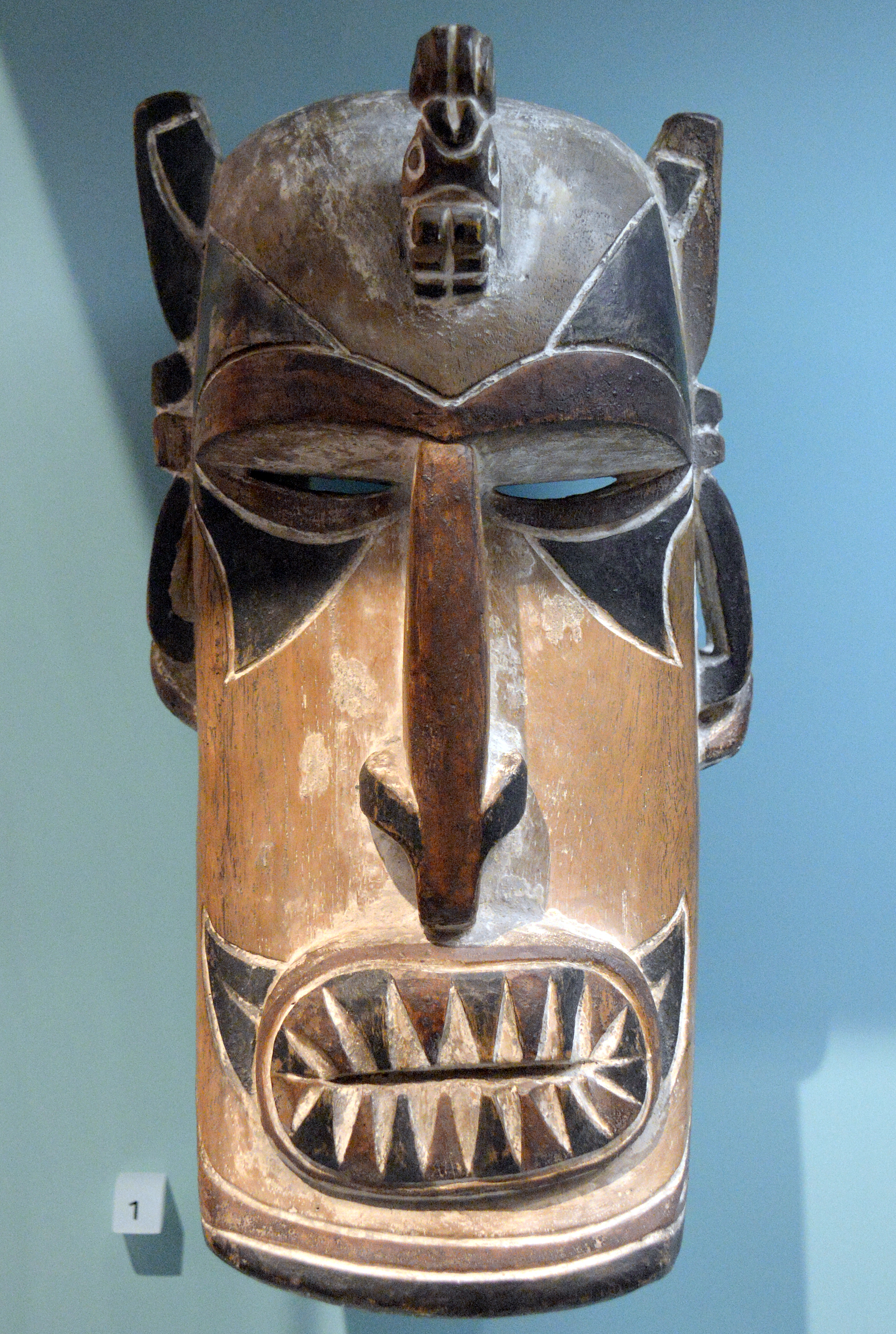
Tami Island mask, from Papua New Guinea, late 19th to early 20th century. National Museum of Scotland, Edinburgh

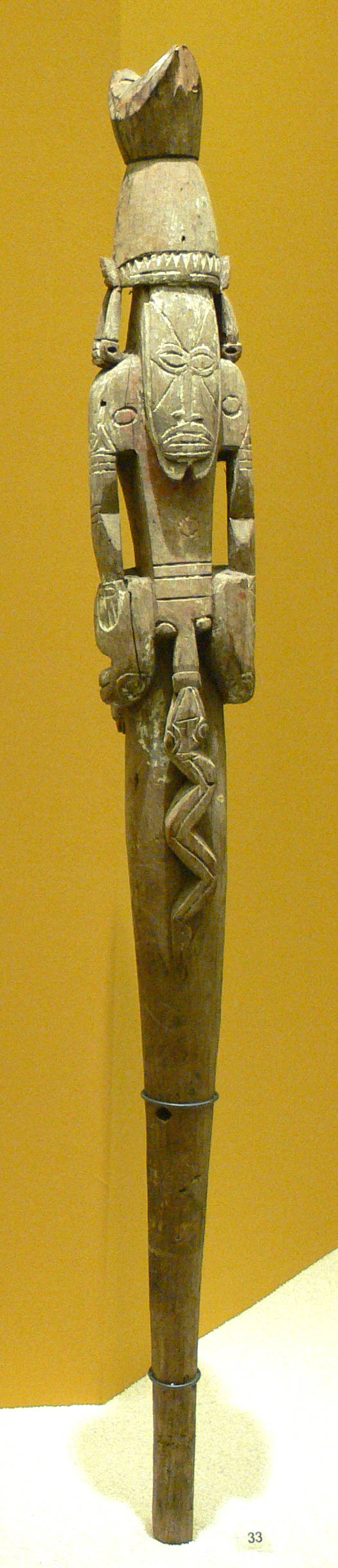
Figure on a stick, Tami Islands (Ethnological Museum of Berlin, acquired in 1907)

Islanders specialized in elaborately carved bowls. These were often used for bridal wealth payments throughout the islands, part of a 200 miles (322 km) regional exchange reaching as far as the Caroline and Solomon Islands. The islanders still make their living through fishing and the production of these bowls, intricately woven sleeping mats, and delicate carvings, and tourism. The evidence of the regional trade is visible in the physiognomy of the inhabitants, who resemble in their facial structure the islanders of New Britain. Islanders decorate themselves with blue and pink paint.

The Tami role in the trading cycle is evident from the bowls, which appear throughout the archipelago, and the Siassi islands. Bowls would be exchanged for dogs' teeth (used for carving and wood working, as well as for jewelry), sweet potatoes, reeds, pigs, bows, arrows, feathers and the betel nut. The Tami bowls are distinctive not only for their specific decorative designs, but because they are made of wood, not of clay; most Papua New Guinea pottery is clay, but the Tami Islands have no clay deposits.

In addition to the rectangular bowls, Tami art also appears in representations of religious figures, some of them massive. Images are full-length and standing, and the head is placed directly on the torso (no neck). The head usually has a headdress, often very ornate, and the arms fall to the side, like a figure almost at attention. Tami carving places circular eyes directly under the forehead. Tami sculpture also has two incised triangles pointing at the centre of the face. Tami masks also appear as products of trade. The depiction of facial figures resembles the style of carving found on the human figures. Tamis depict a variety of animal figures, equally as stylized as the human ones, on wooden bowls, hooks, spatulas, canoe prows, paddles, and other useful tools.

Tami canoes, although outriggers like most of the neighbouring styles, are unique in design and decoration.

"It was about 30 feet long, carved from a very straight log, with ...curved ends and carved heads... The sides were built up with wide, hand–hewn boards, each board at least 20 inches wide and running the length of the canoe in a single piece. These sides were painted in interesting designs of red and white, and the whole canoe bound together with plant fiber of some sort and the joints filled with tree gum. The outrigger was bound with the same strong fiber, and there was not a nail or a piece of metal in the whole job. Neither did any of the parts show marks I could recognize as having been made with modern tools."

The distinctive Tami Island outrigger canoe prows have finer and more rectangular structure than those of other south Milne Bay islanders, although they are similarly painted with shields.

=== European missions and regional trade ===
The islands' position in the larger trading ecology of the eastern islands attracted Johann Flierl, in 1888, who established a Lutheran mission there. Flierl hoped not only to gain the confidence of the Tamis, and convert them to Lutheranism, but also to integrate the mission goals into the island groups with which the Tamis had contact. The process did not work as Flierl planned: instead, the Tami islanders became incorporated into a western-style material culture. As cash-based jobs became available, often working for the Mission itself, they decreased the product of bowls and cult figures. As a result, the Siassi learned to make the wood bowls, taught by Tami island catechists who went to the Siassi Island to help the missionaries.

== World War II ==
During the war, most of the Tamis were evacuated to the main island, and they returned in May 1944. The islands were the target of three raids by the United States Air Corps. On 25 November 1942, a B-25 hit a Japanese cruiser off one of the main islands. On 18 September 1943, a flight of A-20s hit installations on the island itself, and on 21 September 1943, flights of A-20s, B-26s, and the RAAF also targeted installations there. By this time, however, according to local people, the Japanese had left. As a consequence of the bombings, there were large craters in the centre of the villages, and in the betel nut grove, and many of the palm trees were ripped apart.

Today the Tami Islands are protected by the Papua New Guinea National Seas Act 1977.

== Bibliography ==
- Browning, John Gaitha and Oleta Stewart Toliver, An artist at war: the journal of John Gaitha Browning, Texas, University of Texas, 1994. IS.BN 9780929398761
- Encyclopædia Britannica. "Tami style." Encyclopædia Britannica Online 2009. 13 September 2009.
- Garrett, John. Footsteps on the Sea: Christianity in Oceania to World War II. Institute of Pacific Studies, World Council of Churches, 1992, ISBN 978-982-02-0068-5
- Harding, Thomas G. Cultures of the Pacific. New York, Simon and Schuster, 1970. ISBN 978-0-02-913800-7.
- Keurs, Pieter ter. Condensed reality: a study of material culture, case studies from Siassi. Leiden, CNWS Publications, 2006.
- May, Patricia et al. The Traditional Pottery of Papua New Guinea. University of Hawaii Press, 2000. ISBN 978-0-8248-2344-3
- Pacific Wrecks. WWII Accessed 21 September 2009.
- Sullivan, Nancy. Day Trip to Tami, Consultancy Services for Anthropology, 1999–2009, Madang, PNG.Accessed 13 September 2009.
- Tami Islands. Tami. Accessed 13 September 2009.
