= Christian Keyser =

Bavarian missionary (1877–1961)

Christian Gottlob Keyser
- Born: 7 March 1877; Geroldsgrün, Kingdom of Bavaria
- Died: 14 December 1961; Neuendettelsau, Franken, Bavaria
- Education: Missionary Seminary of Neuendettelsau, Franconia
- Spouse: Emilie Heumann
- Children: Jutta, b. 9 June 1907, Sattelberg Papua New Guinea; Hertha, b. 27 October 1908; Imma Eleonora, b. 7 July 1911, Finschhafen, d. 29 September 2004, Neuendettelsau, Germany
- Church: Lutheran Neuendettelsau Mission Society, South Australian Synod
- Writings: Wörterbuch der Kâte-Sprache; Eine Papuagemeinde Das bin bloss ich. Lebenserinnerungen (It is merely me: Memoirs). (1929); A People Reborn. (See partial list)
- Congregations served: Director, Sattelberg Mission Station, Finschhafen District, New Guinea 1900-1920

Christian Gottlob Keyser (also spelled Keysser, Kaiser, 7 March 1877 – 14 December 1961) was a Barvarian Lutheran missionary of the Neuendettelsau Mission Society. He served for almost 22 years at the Neuendettelsau Mission Station in the Finschhafen District of New Guinea, which had been founded in 1892 by Johann Flierl. He controversially proposed the evangelization of tribes, rather than individuals, the concept known as Volkskirche (Congregation Church). An avid linguist, he compiled one of the first dictionaries of a Papuan dialect: Dictionary of the Kâte Language, a Papuan community (Wörterbuch der Kâte-Sprache; Eine Papuagemeinde). He also maintained a regular correspondence with the German Geographical Society in Berlin, reporting on his naturalist findings in New Guinea. He published his memoirs (1929), as well as over 300 essays and pamphlets and ten books. An intrepid explorer, he ascended the Saruwaged Range massif in 1913 and collected many important natural history specimens there.

== Career ==
In 1899, the Neuendettelsau Missionary Society sent Christian Keyser to the Sattelberg Mission Station in New Guinea. There, he worked under the tutelage of the station's founder, Johann Flierl, for several years; he also married the governess of Flierl's four children, Emilie Heumann (b. 14 February 1873 in Strasbourg), in 1903. Keyser proved a gifted and diligent linguist, and he also developed a critical understanding of the Kâte people that Flierl did not have: in this corporatist society, it would not be possible to bring people to Christ one at a time, through individual acceptance of God. Instead, he sought tribal conversions.

The sort of mass conversions Keyser had in mind were not what Flierl envisioned for the mission, but he recognized that Keyser's new energy was indeed what Sattelberg needed at the time. Keyser drew on community norms of the Kâte to develop an idea of the Volkskirche, a church of people. In 1903, he performed the first group baptism; although it was only ten people, it was a start, and laid the groundwork for the mass conversions of 1905 and 1906 (the latter being helped somewhat by a rough earthquake in September 1906).

Keyser returned to Germany in 1921, leaving Adelaide in 1920 on the ship Nestor with his wife and three daughters, and arriving in Germany via London in the spring of 1921. From 1922–1939, he taught missions and was missionary inspector at the Neuendettelsau Missionary College. He taught missions at the Neuendettelsau Seminary, and the University of Erlangen granted him a PhD in 1929 and he taught theology there until 1939. More than 30 of his students went to Papua New Guinea, and more went to other mission sites.

== Writings and discoveries ==
Keyser wrote 10 long works and over 300 small books and essays. His dictionary of the Kâte language includes more than 10,000 words and phrases. During his years at the Sattelberg, he undertook frequent scientific journeys, and was a regular correspondent of the German Geographical Society of Berlin. He discovered hundreds of plants, insects and animals—discovered to Europeans, that is, and several are reported named for him. He was among the first Europeans to ascend the Saruwaged Range, which he did in 1913.

=== Partial list of published works ===
- (in German) Bunte Bilder aus der Missionsarbeit unter den Kâte, Gesellschaft für Innere und Äussere Mission im Sinne der Lutherischen Kirche: Neuendettelsauer Missionsschriften; Nr. 36 Neuendettelsau: Verlag des Missionshauses
- (in German) Ins wilde Waldland: aus der Gehilfenmission auf Sattelberg, Gesellschaft für Innere und Äussere Mission im Sinne der Lutherischen Kirche: Neuendettelsauer Missionsschriften; Nr. 43 Neuendettelsau: Verlag d. Missionshauses, 1920
- (in German) Bai, der Zauberer, Neuendettelsau: Verlag d. Missionshauses, 1923
- (in German) Wörterbuch der Kâte-Sprache gesprochen in Neuguinea, Berlin: D. Reimer, 1925. 7 volumes. (LC classification: PL6621.K3 K4)
- (in German) Nalumotte: Buben- und Mädchengeschichten aus Neuguinea, Neuendettelsau, Buchhandlung der Diakonissen-Anstalt, 1931. (LC classification: 4PZ 362)
- (in German) Urwaldspaziergang, Neuendettelsau, Freimund Druckerei, 1950 München, Kaiser, Verl. 1934
- (in German) Zake, der Papuahäuptling, Stuttgart: Evang. Missionsverl., 1934
- (in German) Altes Testament und heutige Zeit, Neuendettelsau: Freimund-Verl., 1934
- (in German) Die Weltmission ein unmögliches Werk? - Neuendettelsau: Freimund-Verl., [1935]
- (in German) Der Geist, Neuendettelsau: Freimund-Verl., 1935
- (in German) Der prophet von Tobou, Berlin, Heimatdienstverlag, 1940. (LC classification: BV3680.N5 K42)
- (in German) Eine Papuagemeinde, Neuendettelsauer Missionsschriften, Nr. 65. Kassel, Bärenreiter-Verlag, 1929. (LC classification: BV3680.N5 K4)
- (in German) Die Geisterwand, Neuendettelsau, Freimund-Druckerei, [1950]
- (in German) Zake, der Papuahäuptling, Neuendettelsau: Freimund-Verl., [1949]
- (in German) Gottes Weg ins Hubeland, Neuendettelsau, Freimund-Verl., 1949, 2. Aufl.
- (in German) Ist Gott wirklich da?, Basel, Basler Missionsbuchh., 1942
- (in German) Der Prophet von Tobou, Berlin, Heimatdienstverl., 1940
- (in German) Die Papua: Eine Aufführg aus d. Volksleben d. Bergstämme in Neuguinea, Neuendettelsau, Freimund-Verl. 1950
- (in German) Papuaspiele, Neuendettelsau, Freimund-Druckerei 1950
- (in German) Papuakinder, Neuendettelsau: Freimund-Druckerei 1950
- (in German) Eine Papuagemeinde, Neuendettelsau, Freimund-Verl., 1950
- (in German) Papuabriefe, Neuendettelsau, Freimund-Druckerei, [1950]
- (in German) Der Lügenprophet, Neuendettelsau, Freimund-Druckerei, [1950]
- (in German) Die Lopiong-Säule, Neuendettelsau, Freimund-Druckerei, [1950]
- (in German) Heidenangst, Neuendettelsau, Freimund-Druckerei, [1950]
- (in German) Die Geisterwand, Neuendettelsau, Freimund-Druckerei, [1950]
- (in German) Ajo!: Ein Missionsbuch f.d. Jugend. Neuendettelsau: Freimund-Verl. 1956
- (in German) Weite Fahrt: Stories fuer Kinder (with Jutta Zimmermann). Teilw. hrsg. von Jutta Zimmermann. - Lizenz d. Buchhandl. d. Berliner Evang. Missionsges.
- (in German) Der christenfresser. Neuendettelsau, Freimund-Verlag. 1954
- (in German) Nalumotte: Buben- u. Mädchengeschichten aus Neuguinea. Neuendettelsau: Freimund-Verl.1953
- (in German) Papuatorheiten, Neuendettelsau, Freimund Verl 1952
- (in German) Der weggeworfene Junge, Neuendettelsau: Freimund-Verl. 1952
- (in German) Papuanischer Humor. Neuendettelsau: Freimund-Verl. 1952
- (in German) Der Grosshäuptling und seine Frau: Ein papuanisches Sittenbild. Neuendettelsau: Freimund-Verl. 1952
- (in German) Der Steinzeitbauer: Ein Bericht, wie d. heidnische Papua sein Feld bestellt. Neuendettelsau: Freimund-Verl. 1959
- (in German) Lehret alle Völker: Beispiele aus d. Mission zum Kleinen Katechismus. Neuendettelsau: Freimund-Verl. 1960
- (in German) Gottesfeuer. Neuendettelsau: Freimund-Verl., 1959
- (in German) Das bin bloss ich. Lebenserinnerungen. (reprint) Neuendettelsau, Freimund-Verlag, 1966.
- (in English) Kâte dictionary, W. Flierl and H. Strauss, eds. Canberra: Australian National University, 1977. ISBN 0-85883-149-X
- (in English) A people reborn. Pasadena, Calif.: William Carey Library, c1980. Translated from Eine Papuagemeinde by Alfred Allin & John Kuder. ISBN 0-87808-174-7

== Sources about Keyser ==
- (in German)Jürgen Stadler, Die Missionspraxis Christian Keyßers in Neuguinea 1899–1920 : erste Schritte auf dem Weg zu einer einheimischen Kirche, Nürnberg : VTR, 2006 ISBN 3-937965-31-9
- (in German) Wilhelm Fugman, ed. Bürger zweier Welte: Christian Keysser Neuhausen-Stuttgart : Hänssler, 1985, 3-7751-0969-2
- (in German) Wilhelm Fugman. Von Gott erzählen: das Leben Christian Keyssers; 1877–1961. Neuendettelsau : Freimund-Verlag 1978. 3-7726-0084-0
- (in German) Festschrift zum 70. Geburtstag des Herrn Missionsinspektors a.D. Dr.h.c. Christian Keysser in Neuendettelsau am 7. März 1947, [Nürnberg], Bayer. Missionskonferenz 1950.
