= Enarotali Airport =

Enarotali Airport Bandar Udara Enarotali
- IATA: EWI; ICAO: WAYE

Summary
- Airport type: Public
- Owner/Operator: Ministry of Transportation
- Serves: Enarotali
- Location: Enarotali, Paniai Regency, Central Papua, Indonesia
- Elevation AMSL: 6,122 ft / 1,866 m
- Coordinates: 3°55′33″S 136°22′41″E

Map
- Location in Western New Guinea Location in Indonesia

Runways
Direction	Length		Surface
Direction	ft	m	Surface
09/27	3,320	1,012	Asphalt

Enarotali Airport (Indonesian: Bandar Udara Enarotali) (IATA: EWI, ICAO: WAYE) is located in Enarotali, Central Papua, Indonesia. The airport serves the town of Enarotal in Paniai Regency as well as the surrounding regencies. The airport has a single runway of 1,012 m x 18 m and an apron of 40 m x 70 m, which can only accommodate small aircraft, such as the DHC-6 Twin Otter.
