= Saruwaged Range =

Mountain range in Papua New Guinea

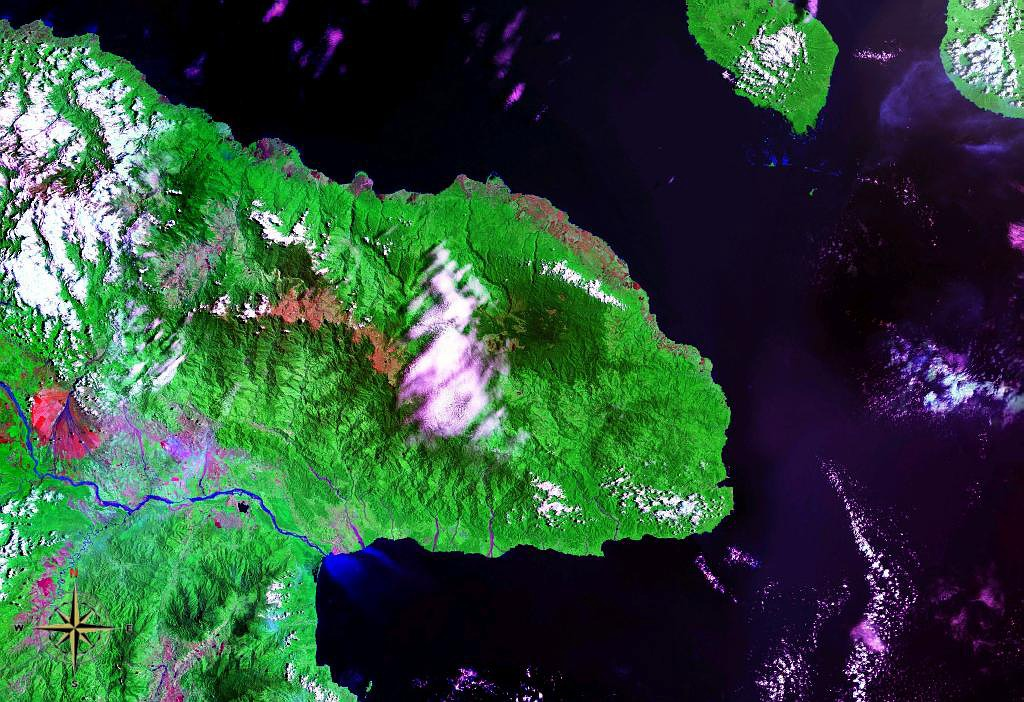
- The Saruwaged Range on the Huon Peninsula as seen from space (false colors).

Highest point
- Peak: 4,121
- Elevation: 1,566 m (5,138 ft)

Geography
- Location within Papua New Guinea
- Country: Papua New Guinea
- Range coordinates: 6°18′39″S 147°05′27″E

The Saruwaged Range (also Saruwared, Sarawaket or Sarawaget) is a mountain range on the Huon Peninsula in Morobe Province, north-eastern Papua New Guinea. The range is dominated by the Sarawaget Massif which is capped by the two peaks of Mount Bangeta and Mount Sarawaged, with given 4,121 m elevation is SRTM compatible.

The Saruwaged Range runs into the Finisterre Range to the west and together they form a natural barrier between the Ramu and Markham valleys to the south and Vitiaz Strait to the north. Streams flowing from its southern flanks feed the Markham.

== History ==
The Germans during their years of administration in the late 19th and early 20th centuries, made several exploratory trips into the range. Early European ascents of Sarawaged Massif include those by the missionary Christian Keyser in 1913 and Charles Lane Poole in 1925. Ascending to these summits would be likely to depend on finding a way through thick tropical rain forest.
