= Uta, Central Papua =

Uta
- Village
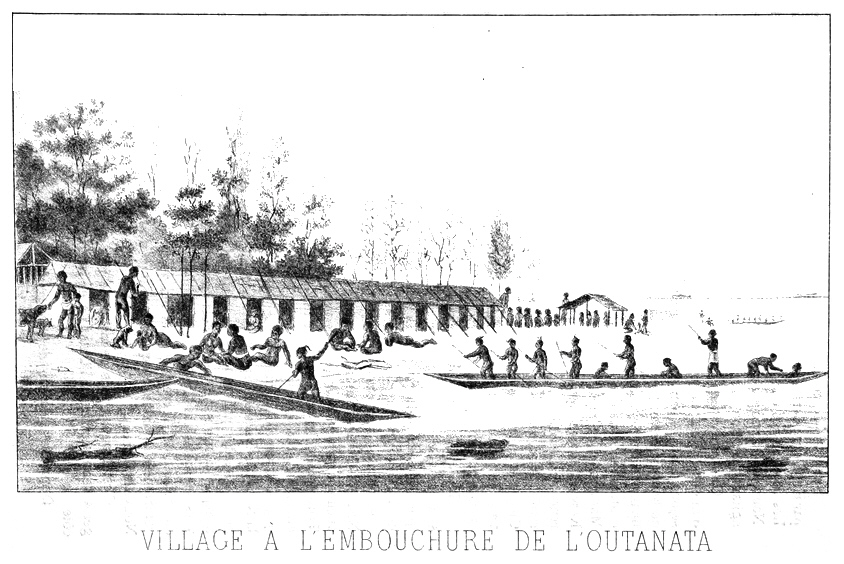
- Illustration of the village by Meyners d'Estrey (1881)

- Location of the village in Central Papua Location of the village in Indonesian Papua Location of the village in Indonesia
- Coordinates: 4°33′S 136°0′E
- Country: Indonesia
- Province: Central Papua
- Regency: Mimika Regency
- District: Mimika Barat Tengah
- Time zone: UTC+9 (WIT)
- Climate: Af

Uta (also known as Oeta, Auta, or Aoeta) is a coastal village in Central Papua, Indonesia.

== Climate ==
Uta has a tropical rainforest climate (Af) with heavy to very heavy rainfall year-round.

Climate data for Uta
Month	Jan	Feb	Mar	Apr	May	Jun	Jul	Aug	Sep	Oct	Nov	Dec	Year
Mean daily maximum °C (°F)	30.9 (87.6)	30.9 (87.6)	30.8 (87.4)	30.5 (86.9)	29.9 (85.8)	28.5 (83.3)	27.5 (81.5)	27.7 (81.9)	28.5 (83.3)	29.5 (85.1)	30.6 (87.1)	30.9 (87.6)	29.7 (85.4)
Daily mean °C (°F)	26.4 (79.5)	26.4 (79.5)	26.4 (79.5)	26.3 (79.3)	26.0 (78.8)	24.9 (76.8)	24.2 (75.6)	24.3 (75.7)	24.8 (76.6)	25.6 (78.1)	26.4 (79.5)	26.5 (79.7)	25.7 (78.2)
Mean daily minimum °C (°F)	22.0 (71.6)	21.9 (71.4)	22.1 (71.8)	22.1 (71.8)	22.1 (71.8)	21.4 (70.5)	20.9 (69.6)	21.0 (69.8)	21.2 (70.2)	21.8 (71.2)	22.2 (72.0)	22.1 (71.8)	21.7 (71.1)
Average rainfall mm (inches)	261 (10.3)	267 (10.5)	278 (10.9)	275 (10.8)	294 (11.6)	315 (12.4)	345 (13.6)	337 (13.3)	229 (9.0)	184 (7.2)	172 (6.8)	224 (8.8)	3,181 (125.2)
Source: Climate-Data.org
