= Unserdeutsch =

German-based creole of Papua New Guinea

- Rabaul Creole German
- Native to: Papua New Guinea
- Native speakers: 110, almost all in Australia (2016)
- Language family: German-based creole

Language codes
- ISO 639-2: crp
- ISO 639-3: uln
- Glottolog: unse1236

Unserdeutsch ('Our German'), or Rabaul Creole German, is a German-based creole language that originated in Papua New Guinea. It is described as a boarding school creole as it emerged among mixed-race children at a Catholic orphanage and school in Vunapope, a neighborhood of Kokopo. The children were educated in German and in contact with several other languages, mainly Tok Pisin which greatly influenced the creole.

== Background ==
The Gazelle Peninsula had become the most prosperous part of German New Guinea which brought along European traders and missionaries, who also brought along workers from other parts of the Pacific. From contact with these migrant workers and colonists with locals led to the mixed-children, who were at one point were called "Vunapope Germans" or the "Mission Mixed-Race Community." 1898, the Missionaries of the Sacred Heart and the Sisters of Our Lady of the Sacred Heart established a boarding school and orphanage at Vunapope for these children.

Contact these children had with German speakers and the languages of their parents (immigrant languages, such as Cantonese, Tagalog, Trukese, Malay, and a host of indigenous languages of Papua New Guinea) helped develop Unserdeutsch. The student-pupil relationship allowed enough social distancing to enable to a common language to develop among the students, influenced also by the missionaries, who emphasised the separateness of German and languages the children encountered outside of school.

German was the language of instruction in Catholic mission schools, which is where the language originated, and children residing in a German-run orphanage later used the language regularly outside of their classrooms. The language developed into a first language for some when these children had families of their own. Oral stories tell a version that Unserdeutsch originated by children sharing stories where they used German vocabulary with Tok Pisin grammar, this change in language is referred to as relexification.

The majority of Unserdeutsch speakers and their families migrated to Australia after Papua New Guinea's independence in 1975. During fieldwork conducted by researchers between 2014 and 2017, there were about 100 speakers found in Australia and around 10 speakers found in Papua New Guinea. The language is no longer learned as a first language.

Most speakers of Unserdeutsch are bilingual; speaking either Standard German, English, Tok Pisin or Kuanua. Most surviving speakers are middle-aged or older, although younger members of the community may comprehend the language. Unserdeutsch is likely a descendant of a pidginised form of Standard German which originated in the Gazelle Peninsula of New Britain during German colonial times among the Catholic mixed-race (Vunapope) community. With increased mobility and intermarriage, it has been disappearing in the last few decades.

Unserdeutsch presumably influenced the development of its neighbour, Tok Pisin. Unlike Namibian Black German in Namibia, it is a creole; indeed, it is the only creole that developed from colonial German.

Further, Unserdeutsch is only composed of three characteristics: movement rules, questions and question words, according to Bickerton and his bioprogram hypothesis.

Example
alle	boy-s	raus	schuv	him	boat
PL	boy-PL	get.out	shove	TR	boat
German	English	German	Ger/Eng	English	English

'Everybody get out, shove the boat!'

== Phonology ==
Volkner (1982) described a great deal of variation in Unserdeutsch's phonology with an acrolect, mesolects, and basilect. Speakers born before 1950 were educated in Standard German and are able to shift between the acrolect and basilect. He also described Unserdeutsch's phonology as being similar to northern German dialects, with only a slight influence from Tok Pisin and English. He further described Unserdeutsch as having a nine-unit vowel system with long and short forms, which is rare for a creole language, and that most consonants from German were maintained.

Lindenfelser and Maintz (2017) later wrote that the basilectal form had a much smaller phoneme inventory than German and that it was largely based off Tok Pisin. They described a five-unit vowel system with three vowel heights, which is typical of a creole language, and that though the vowels have differing amounts of opening, this variation is not phonologically distinctive. They also described the consonants as deriving primarily from Tok Pisin and that only three consonants specific to German were preserved /f ʃ tʃ/. Lindenfelser and Maintz did agree that Unserdeutsch is influenced by northern German dialects, linking it to a Westphalian-Rhenisch spoken koine.

Volkner (1982) Consonants
		Labial	Dental/Alveolar	Postalveolar	Palatal	Velar	Glottal
Nasal		m	n			ŋ	
Plosive	voiceless	p	t			k	
Plosive	voiced	b	d			ɡ	
Affricate					tʃ		
Fricative	voiceless	f	s	ʃ	ç	x	h
Fricative	voiced	v		(ʒ)			
Approximant			l		j	w	
Rhotic			r				

Volkner noted these phonological changes of German consonants in Unserdeutsch:

- Voiced stops at the end of words in German can become voiceless due to grammatical changes, in Unserdeutsch this only occurs with /b/
- Final /t/ or /d/ are deleted, the exception of a few words
- Final /g/ never becomes /k/, though it may become /ç/ or deleted
- Clusters /ts/ and /pf/ became /s/ and /f/
- /d/ is deleted before /ə/
- Where /n/ would have been before a deleted /d/ now becomes /ŋ/
- /ŋ/ can followed by an extra consonant, usually /k/ or /j/
- /ʒ/ only occurred in English loan words
- /x/ only appeared in some words and was replaced in by /ç/ in all others
- Medial /ç/ becomes /h/ and final /ç/ is deleted or becomes /k/
- Clusters containing /ʃ/ have an initial /s/ added if the cluster contains /r/ or word finally
- German /z/ is non-existent in Unserdeutsch, though some speakers pronounced it in some English loan words
- Where German had /v/, it has become /w/ though speakers could hypercorrect leading to use of /v/ in English words that normally have /w/

		Labial	Dental/Alveolar	Postalveolar	Palatal	Velar	Glottal
Nasal		m	n			ŋ	
Plosive	voiceless	p	t			k	
Plosive	voiced	b	d			ɡ	
Affricate					tʃ		
Fricative	voiceless	f	s	ʃ			h
Fricative	voiced	v					
Approximant			l		j	w	
Rhotic			r				

Lindenfelser and Maintz described that the German consonants /ç χ pf ts ʁ/ʀ z/ were absent or substituted in the following ways in Unserdeutsch:

- [ç] became [h] or was deleted, Kirche became [kirhɛ]
- [χ] became [h] or was deleted, lachen became [lahɛn]
- [pf] became [f], Pflanzung became [flansuŋ]
- [ts] became [s] zusammen became [susamɛn]
- [ʁ/ʀ] became [r] trinken became [triŋkɛn]
- [z] became [s] diese/dieser/dieses all became [disɛ]

=== Vowels ===
Volkner described Unserdeutsch as having short and long vowels, but that they were considerably shorter than in Standard German, so that a long vowel in Unserdeutsch is in between a Standard German short and long vowel and a short vowel is shorter than that of Standard German. Vowel length in an Unserdeutsch word is nearly always the same as that of the corresponding German word.

Unserdeutsch's vowel phonemes as described in 1982:

	Front	Central	Back
Close	ɪ i y	ɨ	u ʊ
Mid	e ø ɛ	ə	o ɔ
Open	a		

Some changes of German vowels in Unserdeutsch are noted as:

- The German phonemes /ʏ/, /ɛː/, and /œ/ merged with /y/, /ɛ/, and /ø/ respectively. This was universal in Unserdeutsch.
- Influence from English and Tok Pisin had caused /y/ to become /i/ in several common words of the basilect.
- An influence from Tok Pisin and Papuan languages has to led to a lack of distinction between /i/ and /ɪ/.
- A hypercorrection of /ʊ/ to /y/ in some speakers.
- As in German and English the schwa /ə/ is found in unaccented syllables and like in German it is pronounced /ɛ/ or /e/ when the syllable is stressed.
- A feature from Tok Pisin is an epenthetic vowel /ɨ/, which is placed in between the consonants in some words, so that German klein is pronounced /kɨlain/.

Lindenfelser and Maintz described Unserdeutsch's vowels as largely the same as Tok Pisin, with /ɛ/ instead of /e/. German long vowels were shortened and umlaut vowels were delabialised, so that /y/ and /ʏ/ became /i/ and /ø/ became /ɛ/. German reduction vowels /ɐ/ and /ə/ were replaced by /ɛ/.

	Front	Back
Close	i	u
Mid	ɛ	o
Open	a	

== Grammar ==
Unserdeutsch is typical of creole languages in that it reflects the lexicon of one language overlaid upon a substrate grammar – in this case German and Tok Pisin, respectively. Grammatically, Unserdeutsch bears many similarities to L2 varieties of German, suggesting incomplete language acquisition on the part of students in the German-speaking colony. Grammatically, Unserdeutsch morphology adheres to "average" creole characteristics, but because Unserdeutsch was never formally standardized, being used only informally as an in-group register, there is an unusually high degree of grammatical variation among speakers of Unserdeutsch, both between familial groups and individual speakers.

More recently, Australian English has also influenced the language in several ways. Certain syntactic constructions appear to have been borrowed directly from English, including an English-like passive voice construction utilizing a copula. Both of these features are generally rare in creole languages, which indicates an early, pervasive English influence that might have included conscious modeling of English sentence structure.

=== Sentence structure ===
Unserdeutsch word order is rigidly SVO and lacks the V2 constituent order of subordinate clauses found in Standard German. This tendency extends even to imperative sentences and yes/no questions, which demonstrates a strong substrate influence from Tok Pisin.

Furthermore, even WH-fronting is optional in Unserdeutsch, and these types of interrogatives often come at the end of a sentence, as in Tok Pisin, rather than at the beginning as in Standard German or English. However, some speakers prefer to use a German-modeled sentence pattern in which the interrogative is in head position.

Du wid geht wo?
Where would you go?

Fi was du muss sterben?
Why do you have to die?

The use of either construction appears variable among speakers of Unserdeutsch.

=== Nouns ===
Unserdeutsch nouns are derived almost exclusively from the German lexicon, but noun morphology is much less synthetic than Standard German. Unserdeutsch nouns do not change to indicate grammatical gender or case, nor is there overt plural marking.

==== Number ====
Rather than taking specific singular and plural forms, as in Standard German, Unserdeutsch nouns are pluralized almost exclusively by the pronominal marker alle, unless plurality is already indicated by a numeral or pronoun, in which case it is omitted entirely. Thus, most nouns in Unserdeutsch are pluralized as in the following example:

Er malen alle plan fi bauen alle haus.
He drew the blueprints for the construction of the houses.

There are few frequently used nouns which retain Standard German plural forms and are thus double-marked for plural. These irregular forms are retained perhaps owing to frequency of use.

==== Articles ====
Like German but unlike its substrate language, Tok Pisin, Unserdeutsch uses definite and indefinite articles. However, unlike German, these articles are not inflected for gender or case, and in fact the Standard German articles are merged into a single article de; this is possibly due to influence from English. Articles are normally only used with singular nouns, with the generalized plural marker alle functioning as a definite plural article. The full Unserdeutsch article set is as follows:

	Singular	Plural
Definite	de	alle
Indefinite	ein	Ø

Speakers of Unserdeutsch often omit articles altogether in speech.

=== Verbs ===
Nearly all Unserdeutsch verbs are lexically derived from Standard German, but the Unserdeutsch inflectional system exhibits strong influence from English and Tok Pisin, and is considerably more isolating than Standard German. Many of the distinguishing characteristics of Standard German verbs, such as separable prefixes, second- and third-person stem change and the strong/weak distinction, are not present in Unserdeutsch.

==== Morphology ====
Verbs are generally not inflected according to person or number. Thus, the present tense form of most Unserdeutsch verbs is identical to the Standard German infinitive, which is not conjugated. A small number of verbs take an infinitive form that is instead modeled after the German third-person singular form (geht, 'go') or verb stem (bleib, 'stay'), and some transitive verbs of English or Tok Pisin origin take the Tok Pisin suffix -im (adoptim, 'to adopt'). The following example illustrates verb morphology compared to Standard German:

De Koenigin anfang.

(Die Königin fängt an)
The queen begins.

==== Tense ====
There is no overt preterite in Unserdeutsch, but a generalized past tense can be indicated through the use of the uninflected verb hat ('have') alongside a highly regularized German participle form, which is constructed by the addition of the prefix ge- to the infinitive. Even verbs borrowed from English or Tok Pisin are prefixed in this way. Thus:

Wi hat geheiraten, orait, wi hat gegeht...
We got married, all right, (then) we went away...

There are few high frequency verbs that exhibit past tense forms closer to their Standard German counterparts, although these forms are lexicalized and non-productive.

There is also a form of weakly grammaticalized future tense marked by the auxiliary wit ('will,' from German wird), which is used with the infinitive in the following way:

Du wit sehn Freddy morgen.
You will see Freddy tomorrow.

Overall, though, the marking of tense is optional, and many speakers of Unserdeutsch do not distinguish between tense-specific forms.

==== Copula ====
Unusually for a creole language, Unserdeutsch has a copula which is, by contrast to the rest of the verb system, conjugated in present tense. The copular forms are very similar to their Standard German counterparts. In past tense, the copula is simply war; it is not conjugated at all. Thus:

Present Tense
	Singular	Plural
1st person	i bin	wir bis
2nd person	du bis	eu seid
3rd person	er/sie is	die sind

Past Tense
	Singular	Plural
1st person	i war	wir war
2nd person	du war	eu war
3rd person	er/sie war	die war

Some speakers preferentially use an uninflected copula, bis, as in:

Mama du hoeren i bis deutsch am sprehen!
Mama, do you hear me, I am speaking German!

Notably, whether inflected or not, the copula is frequently deleted in spoken Unserdeutsch.

==== Aspect, mood and voice ====
The Unserdeutsch aspect system is fairly complex. Typical of a creole language, most of these constructions are formed by the addition of preverbal markers.

Progressive or habitual aspect is expressed using the so-called am construction, formed using the particle am and the infinitive verb.

Sie is am lahen!
She is laughing!

Habitual past action can be marked using the auxiliary wit (or sometimes wid) along with an infinitive verb, a construction that functions similarly to English past tense would phrases. The wit auxiliary can also express conditional aspect, although this usage is rare.

Jetz i wit ni leben in New Guinea.
Now I would not live in New Guinea.

There is no true imperative in Unserdeutsch. Command statements are formed identically to declarative clauses, and unlike English or German (but similar to Tok Pisin) these constructions retain SVO word order.

Du ni denken dass i war ni angs.
Don't think I wasn't afraid.

It is possible in Unserdeutsch to form directional serial verbs using the so-called komm construction. This compound verb construction uses the verbs komm and geht, which are reanalyzed as directional markers.

Un dann de bishop laufen komm.
And then the bishop came there.

Interestingly, it is also possible to form an English-like passive voice construction using the past tense copula war, the past participle, and the preposition bei.

De Chicken war gestohlen bei alle Raskol.
The chicken was stolen by the thieves.

This passive construction is very rare, and is a clear example of secondary adstrate influence from English.

==== Negation ====
Verb phrases are negated by the particle ni ('not,' from German nicht), which is usually placed at the beginning of the phrase. In a few idiomatic expressions, the negator is post-verbal, more closely mirroring German negation syntax.

I ni essen rote fleisch.
I don't eat red meat.

=== Pronouns ===
Unserdeutsch uses a hybrid system of personal pronouns, demonstrating heavy influence from both the substrate and lexifier languages.

	Singular	Plural
1st person	i	wi / uns
2nd person	du	eu / du
3rd person	er / sie	die

Two pronouns, first-person plural wi and third-person singular masculine er, have distinct object forms (uns and ihm, respectively), reflecting Standard German pronominal case marking. It has been suggested by Volker (1982) that, when used in subject position, the first-person plural uns is exclusive, although this is disputed. Volker (1982) also identifies an object form of first-person singular, mi, which is not attested elsewhere.

==== Usage ====
Use of the second-person plural eu is rare, and du is sometimes substituted. The third-person pronouns mark biological sex only, and there is no equivalent to the German or English neuter forms. There are no formal pronouns in Unserdeutsch, perhaps reflecting non-European cultural conceptions of friendship and acquaintance in the South Pacific. The second-person singular du can be used in place of the Standard German impersonal pronoun man, mirroring English usage. Reflexive and reciprocal pronouns are not used in Unserdeutsch; rarely, these are formed by combining the pronoun with selbs ('self') or direct borrowing of the English "each other." In some cases, personal pronouns can be omitted entirely.

==== Possessive pronouns ====
The Unserdeutsch possessive pronouns, while outwardly similar to their Standard German counterparts, do not take case, gender or number endings.

	Singular	Plural
1st person	mein	Ø
2nd person	dein	euer
3rd person	sein / ihre	Ø

There is no first-person (outside of the name Unserdeutsch) or third-person plural possessive pronoun; in order to express these forms of possession, speakers generally use a prepositional construction with fi.

=== Adjectives ===
With very few exceptions, Unserdeutsch adjectives are lexically identical to their German counterparts. As with other parts of speech, these adjectives are considerably more analytical than those of Standard German. Adjectives precede the referent, and show no agreement for case or gender. There is an attributive marker reanalyzed from the Standard German adjective endings into a uniform and invariant -e, which is suffixed to an adjective that precedes a verb. Thus:

I bis eine grosse medhen.
I am a big girl.

A handful of high frequency adjectives, such as gut, retain their Standard German suppletive forms (such as besser and beste).

==== Comparison ====
The comparative forms of most Unserdeutsch adjectives are marked analytically using the particle mehr ('more'). The superlative is formed using the suffix -ste, but without the vowel changes that characterize this process in Standard German. Thus, the comparative and superlative constructions are formed as follows:

Maria is mehr klen denn Des.
Maria is smaller than Des.

Diese is de groesste.
This is the biggest.

A few high frequency adjectives retain their German synthetic comparative and superlative forms.

alt, elter, eltest
old, older, oldest

=== Possession ===
Aside from possessive pronouns, Unserdeutsch has three constructions that mark possession, each modeled after forms found in one of the dominant languages of the area, Tok Pisin, German and English.

The first of these forms uses a preposition, fi, to express possession, similar to the Tok Pisin bilong construction.

Haus fi Tom
Tom's house

The second form simply juxtaposes the possessor immediately before the item possessed, as is found is many dialects of German.

Diese Car, de Tyre is heruntergegangen.
This car's tire is flat.

The last form is modeled after English, wherein the possessor takes an overt -s genitive suffix.

Papas Waesche
Papa's washing

This English-modeled form is less common than the other two.
