= Faraba, Ivory Coast =

Faraba
- Village
- Location in Ivory Coast
- Coordinates: 8°39′N 6°15′W
- Country: Ivory Coast
- District: Woroba
- Region: Béré
- Department: Dianra
- Sub-prefecture: Dianra-Village
- Time zone: UTC+0 (GMT)

Faraba is a village in north-western Ivory Coast. It is in the sub-prefecture of Dianra-Village, Dianra Department, Béré Region, Woroba District. It has a population of 5,934.

Faraba was a commune until March 2012, when it became one of 1,126 communes nationwide that were abolished.
