= Bobo-Tiénigbé =

Bobo-Tiénigbé Bobo-Tieningboué
- Village
- Location in Ivory Coast
- Coordinates: 8.45°N 5.79°W
- Country: Ivory Coast
- District: Woroba
- Region: Béré
- Department: Mankono
- Sub-prefecture: Marandallah
- Time zone: UTC+0 (GMT)

Bobo-Tiénigbé (also spelled Bobo-Tieningboué) is a village in north-central Ivory Coast. It is in the sub-prefecture of Marandallah, Mankono Department, Béré Region, Woroba District.

Bobo-Tiénigbé was a commune until March 2012, when it became one of 1,126 communes nationwide that were abolished.
