= Kamoro =

- Village
- Location in Ivory Coast
- Coordinates: 8°18′N 5°43′W
- Country: Ivory Coast
- District: Woroba
- Region: Béré
- Department: Mankono
- Sub-prefecture: Bouandougou
- Time zone: UTC+0 (GMT)

Kamoro is a village in north-central Ivory Coast. It is in the sub-prefecture of Bouandougou, Mankono Department, Béré Region, Woroba District.

Kamoro was a commune until March 2012, when it became one of 1,126 communes nationwide that were abolished.
