= Soukourougban 1 =

- Village
- Location in Ivory Coast
- Coordinates: 7°51′N 5°56′W
- Country: Ivory Coast
- District: Woroba
- Region: Béré
- Department: Kounahiri
- Sub-prefecture: Kounahiri
- Time zone: UTC+0 (GMT)

Soukourougban 1 is a village in northwestern Ivory Coast. It is in the sub-prefecture of Kounahiri, Kounahiri Department, Béré Region, Woroba District. It lies along the A8 road, connected to Séguéla in the west and Bouaké in the east.

Soukourougban 1 was a commune until March 2012, when it became one of 1,126 communes nationwide that were abolished.
