= Siriho =

Siriho Sirihio
- Village
- Location in Ivory Coast
- Coordinates: 8°24′N 6°3′W
- Country: Ivory Coast
- District: Woroba
- Region: Béré
- Department: Mankono
- Sub-prefecture: Sarhala
- Time zone: UTC+0 (GMT)

Siriho (also spelled Sirihio) is a village in northwestern Ivory Coast. It is in the sub-prefecture of Sarhala, Mankono Department, Béré Region, Woroba District.

Siriho was a commune until March 2012, when it became one of 1,126 communes nationwide that were abolished.
