= Sononzo =

- Village
- Location in Ivory Coast
- Coordinates: 8°38′N 6°8′W
- Country: Ivory Coast
- District: Woroba
- Region: Béré
- Department: Dianra
- Sub-prefecture: Dianra-Village
- Time zone: UTC+0 (GMT)

Sononzo is a village in northwestern Ivory Coast. It is in the sub-prefecture of Dianra-Village, Dianra Department, Béré Region, Woroba District.

Sononzo was a commune until March 2012, when it became one of 1,126 communes nationwide that were abolished.
