= Manabri =

Manabri Manambri
- Village
- Location in Ivory Coast
- Coordinates: 8°40′N 6°37′W
- Country: Ivory Coast
- District: Woroba
- Region: Worodougou
- Department: Kani
- Sub-prefecture: Kani
- Time zone: UTC+0 (GMT)

Manabri (also spelled Manambri) is a village in north-western Ivory Coast. It is in the sub-prefecture of Kani, Kani Department, Worodougou Region, Woroba District.

Manabri was a commune until March 2012, when it became one of 1,126 communes nationwide that were abolished.
