= Bobi =

Bobi may refer to:

== People ==
- Slobodan Bobi Božinovski (born 1981), Macedonian footballer
- Robert Bobi Jones (1929–2017), Welsh Christian academic and prolific writer in Welsh
- Nickname of Boban Marjanović (born 1988), Serbian basketball player
- Blagoja Milevski (born 1971), Macedonian football manager and former player
- Boban Mitev (born 1972), Macedonian basketball coach
- Boban Bobi Mojsovski (born 1992), Macedonian singer
- Bobi Sourander (1928–2008), Finnish-Swedish author and journalist
- Bobi Tsankov (1979–2019), Bulgarian journalist, crime writer and radio personality
- Bobi Verdeș (born 1980), Romanian footballer
- Bobi Wine, stage name of Uganda musician Robert Ssentamu Kyagulanyi (born 1982)
- Gani Bobi (1943–1995), Albanian philosopher and sociologist

== Places ==
- Bobi, Ivory Coast, a village in Woroba District
- Bobi, Uganda, a town in Gulu District

== Other uses ==
- Bobi (dog), (1992–2023) erroneously cited as the longest-lived dog on record

== See also ==
- Boyan (given name), a Bulgarian given name shortened to Bobi
