= Djena (Côte d'Ivoire) =

- Town and sub-prefecture
- Location in Ivory Coast
- Country: Ivory Coast
- District: Woroba
- Region: Worodougou
- Department: Seguela

Population (2021)
  - Total: 516
- Time zone: GMT

Djéna, located in the Woroba district of Ivory Coast, is a locality with approximately 516 inhabitants. It lies near the localities of Digila, Massala and Faragouéla.

== Villages ==
The 10 villages of the Woroba district and their population in 2021 are:

1. Blela (334)
2. Bouila (667)
3. Djena (516)
4. Djenigbe (2 512)
5. Djiguibala (1 268)
6. Diguila (655)
7. Gbihana (737)
8. Kouroukoro (1 088)
9. Massala (3 596)
10. Tiemassoba (1 514)

== Population and local life ==
According to the 2021 General Population and Housting Census (RGPH), Djéna's population is estimated at 516 inhabants, comprising 257 men and 258 women. This village lies on substence farming and small-scale trade, as is common in most villages of Worodougou region.
