= Soba (disambiguation) =

Soba is a type of Japanese buckwheat noodle.

Soba or SOBA may also refer to:

== Places ==
- Soba (city), capital of the Nubian kingdom of Alodia, now in Sudan
- Soba, Angola, in Vila Estoril, Belas, Luanda province
- Soba, Cantabria, Spain
- Soba, Korhogo, a neighbourhood of the city of Korhogo, Savanes District, Ivory Coast
- Soba, Nigeria, city in Nigeria
- Soba, Woroba, a village in Woroba District, Ivory Coast
- Ṣōbā, transliterated Syriac name of Nisibis, now Nusaybin, a city in Turkey

== Other uses ==
- Soba (film), a 2004 film directed by Mexican filmmaker Alan Coton
- Sounds of Blackness Award (S.O.B.A or SOBA), an annual Canadian awards in hip hop and urban music
- Sobá, a Brazilian dish adapted from Okinawa soba

== See also ==
- Zobah, the capital of an early Aramean state in southern Syria
- Sobat (disambiguation)
