= Béréni-Dialla =

Béréni-Dialla Béréni-Marbana
- Village
- Location in Ivory Coast
- Coordinates: 7°59′N 6°53′W
- Country: Ivory Coast
- District: Woroba
- Region: Worodougou
- Department: Séguéla
- Sub-prefecture: Sifié
- Time zone: UTC+0 (GMT)

Béréni-Dialla (also known as Béréni-Marbana) is a village in western Ivory Coast. It is in the sub-prefecture of Sifié, Séguéla Department, Worodougou Region, Woroba District.

Béréni-Dialla was a commune until March 2012, when it became one of 1,126 communes nationwide that were abolished.
