= Kouatta =

- Village
- Location in Ivory Coast
- Coordinates: 7°53′N 5°49′W
- Country: Ivory Coast
- District: Woroba
- Region: Béré
- Department: Kounahiri
- Sub-prefecture: Kounahiri
- Time zone: UTC+0 (GMT)

Kouatta is a village in central Ivory Coast. It is in the sub-prefecture of Kounahiri, Kounahiri Department, Béré Region, Woroba District.

Kouatta was a commune until March 2012, when it became one of 1,126 communes nationwide that were abolished.
