= Silakoro =

Silakoro Sélakoro
- Village
- Location in Ivory Coast
- Coordinates: 8°1′N 6°57′W
- Country: Ivory Coast
- District: Woroba
- Region: Worodougou
- Department: Séguéla
- Sub-prefecture: Sifié
- Time zone: UTC+0 (GMT)

Silakoro (also spelled Sélakoro) is a village in western Ivory Coast. It is in the sub-prefecture of Sifié, Séguéla Department, Worodougou Region, Woroba District.

Silakoro was a commune until March 2012, when it became one of 1,126 communes nationwide that were abolished.
