= Diarabana =

- Town
- Location in Ivory Coast
- Coordinates: 8°11′N 6°37′W
- Country: Ivory Coast
- District: Woroba
- Region: Worodougou
- Department: Séguéla
- Sub-prefecture: Bobi-Diarabana
- Time zone: UTC+0 (GMT)

Diarabana is a town in north-western Ivory Coast. It is the seat of the sub-prefecture of Bobi-Diarabana in Séguéla Department, Worodougou Region, Woroba District.

Diarabana was a commune until March 2012, when it became one of 1,126 communes nationwide that were abolished.
