= Bobi, Ivory Coast =

Bobi
- Village
- Location in Ivory Coast
- Coordinates: 8°10′N 6°32′W
- Country: Ivory Coast
- District: Woroba
- Region: Worodougou
- Department: Séguéla
- Sub-prefecture: Bobi-Diarabana
- Time zone: UTC+0 (GMT)

Bobi is a village in Ivory Coast. It is in the sub-prefecture of Bobi-Diarabana, Séguéla Department, Worodougou Region, Woroba District.

Bobi was a commune until March 2012, when it became one of 1,126 communes nationwide that were abolished.
