= Ouédallah =

- Village
- Location in Ivory Coast
- Coordinates: 8°10′N 5°46′W
- Country: Ivory Coast
- District: Woroba
- Region: Béré
- Department: Mankono
- Sub-prefecture: Tiéningboué
- Time zone: UTC+0 (GMT)

Ouédallah is a village in central Ivory Coast. It is in the sub-prefecture of Tiéningboué, Mankono Department, Béré Region, Woroba District.

Ouédallah was a commune until March 2012, when it became one of 1,126 communes nationwide that were abolished.
