= Dialakoro, Ivory Coast =

Dialakoro
- Village
- Location in Ivory Coast
- Coordinates: 8°12′N 5°51′W
- Country: Ivory Coast
- District: Woroba
- Region: Béré
- Department: Mankono
- Sub-prefecture: Tiéningboué
- Time zone: UTC+0 (GMT)

Dialakoro is a village in north-central Ivory Coast. It is in the sub-prefecture of Tiéningboué, Mankono Department, Béré Region, Woroba District.

Dialakoro was a commune until March 2012, when it became one of 1,126 communes nationwide that were abolished.
