= Soba, Woroba =

Soba
- Village
- Location in Ivory Coast
- Coordinates: 8.58°N 6.61°W
- Country: Ivory Coast
- District: Woroba
- Region: Worodougou
- Department: Kani
- Sub-prefecture: Kani
- Time zone: UTC+0 (GMT)

Soba is a village in northwestern Ivory Coast. It is in the sub-prefecture of Kani, Kani Department, Worodougou Region, Woroba District.

Until 2012, Soba was in the commune of Soba-Banandjé. In March 2012, Soba-Banandjé became one of 1,126 communes nationwide that were abolished.
