= Gbétogo =

- Village
- Location in Ivory Coast
- Coordinates: 8°8′N 6°57′W
- Country: Ivory Coast
- District: Woroba
- Region: Worodougou
- Department: Séguéla
- Sub-prefecture: Worofla
- Time zone: UTC+0 (GMT)

Gbétogo is a village in north-western Ivory Coast. It is in the sub-prefecture of Worofla, Séguéla Department, Worodougou Region, Woroba District.

Gbétogo was a commune until March 2012, when it became one of 1,126 communes nationwide that were abolished.
