= Sifié =

- Town, sub-prefecture, and commune
- Location in Ivory Coast
- Coordinates: 7°59′N 6°56′W
- Country: Ivory Coast
- District: Woroba
- Region: Worodougou
- Department: Séguéla

Population (2014)
  - Total: 23,667
- Time zone: UTC+0 (GMT)

Sifié is a town in western Ivory Coast. It is a sub-prefecture and commune of Séguéla Department in Worodougou Region, Woroba District. In 2014, the population of the sub-prefecture of Séguéla was 63,774.

== Villages ==
The twenty villages of the sub-prefecture of Sifié and their population in 2014 are:

1. Babien (3 866)
2. Béréni-Dialla (3 953)
3. Béréni-Marhana (392)
4. Dar Es Salam (774)
5. Dasso (1 636)
6. Dienfé (2 183)
7. Dioulassoba (520)
8. Djénigbè (319)
9. Gbèlo (1 077)
10. Gouramba (537)
11. Niandozo (179)
12. Sélakoro (382)
13. Sifié (3 142)
14. Sinigoro (495)
15. Dangrézo (875)
16. Drissasso (1 334)
17. Gboklosso (61)
18. Kénégbè (1 350)
19. Lalo (315)
20. Ouattarasso (277)
