= Kounahiri =

Kounahiri Koumahiri
- Town, sub-prefecture, and commune
- Location in Ivory Coast
- Coordinates: 7°48′N 5°50′W
- Country: Ivory Coast
- District: Woroba
- Region: Béré
- Department: Kounahiri

Population (2014)
  - Total: 42,037
- Time zone: UTC+0 (GMT)

Kounahiri (also spelled Koumahiri) is a town in central Ivory Coast. It is a sub-prefecture of and the seat of Kounahiri Department in Béré Region, Woroba District. Kounahiri is also a commune. In 2014, the population of the sub-prefecture of Kounahiri was 42,037.

== Villages ==
The thirty one villages of the sub-prefecture of Kounahiri and their population in 2014 are:

1. Agbaou (1.228)
2. Asséyaokro (799)
3. Bahitipla (730)
4. Bakopla (948)
5. Balépla (559)
6. Bambalouma (2,559)
7. Bapla (756)
8. Bassapla (210)
9. Blipla (1,270)
10. Bomassapla (597)
11. Bourébo (835)
12. Boyaokro (3,304)
13. Dorodipla (382)
14. Fassapla (569)
15. Foutounou (1,218)
16. Féliapla (936)
17. Gbehoua (354)
18. Gbotopla (723)
19. Gbétépla (480)
20. Golipla (1,844)
21. Grahipla (790)
22. Kominapla (1,482)
23. Kouatta (1,862)
24. Kounahiri (5,483)
25. Léasso (2,606)
26. Sogbéni (1,460)
27. Soukourougban 1 (4,434)
28. Soukourousso (223)
29. Tianda (657)
30. Trafesso (1,849)
31. Yoman Kouahipla (890)
