= Massala, Ivory Coast =

Massala
- Town, sub-prefecture, and commune
- Location in Ivory Coast
- Coordinates: 7°54′N 6°26′W
- Country: Ivory Coast
- District: Woroba
- Region: Worodougou
- Department: Séguéla

Population (2014)
  - Total: 23,021
- Time zone: UTC+0 (GMT)

Massala is a town in western Ivory Coast. It is a sub-prefecture and commune of Séguéla Department in Worodougou Region, Woroba District.

In 2014, the population of the sub-prefecture of Massala was 23,021.

== Villages ==
The thirty one villages of the sub-prefecture of Massala and their population in 2014 are:

1. Bléla (388)
2. Bouila (255)
3. Djéna (352)
4. Djénigbé (255)
5. Djiguibala (52)
6. Djiguila (1 259)
7. Kourokoro (596)
8. Massala (3 186)
9. Tiémassoba (783)
10. Banhana (280)
11. Diakala (489)
12. Dienfé (817)
13. Diobala (775)
14. Diorholé (3 711)
15. Fimana (656)
16. Fragbara (116)
17. Gbalo (801)
18. Gbihana (1 058)
19. Gbogolo (1 159)
20. Kavala (553)
21. Kouassikro (126)
22. Kramoasso (110)
23. Marhana (807)
24. Samina (1 396)
25. Souloumana (551)
26. Tiéma-Gbéla (370)
27. Tonhoulé (817)
28. Tonon (310)
29. Toukro (498)
30. Yangana (230)
31. Yomankro (265)
