= Mona people =

Mandinka people from West Africa

The Mona are a Mandinka people from West Africa living in west-central Côte d'Ivoire, in the Mankono department.

== Ethnonymy ==
According to the sources and the context, we observe different forms: Ganmu, Monas, Mono, Mouan, Mouâ, Mouin, Muana, Muan, Mwanu, Mwa, Mwe.

== Language ==
Their language is Mona (or Mwan), a Mande language whose number of speakers was estimated at 20,000 in 2012.

== Bibliography ==
- Alain-Michel Boyer, Les Wan, Mona et Koyaka de Côte d'Ivoire: the sacred, the secret, Fondation Culturelle Musée Barbier-Mueller, Hazan, Paris, 2011, 175 p. ( ISBN 978-2-754-1055-14 )
