= Dialakoro =

Dialakoro may refer to:

- Dialakoro, Burkina Faso
- Dialakoro, Côte d'Ivoire
- Dialakoro, Faranah, Guinea
- Dialakoro, Kankan, Guinea
- Dialakoro, Mali
