= Sobat =

Sobat may refer to:

- Sobat, Afghanistan
- Sobat River, in South Sudan
- SS Sobat, a British coaster
- Synchronized On-Board Audio Track (SOBAT), an audio playback technology used in Walt Disney Parks and Resorts rides
- Gail Sidonie Sobat, Canadian writer, educator, singer and performer
- Sohbat, a dish made in Dera Ismail Khan District, Pakistan
- 2009 Sobat River ambush, Jikany Nuer tribesmen vs. the Sudanese People's Liberation Army (SPLA), escorting a United Nations (UN) aid convoy
- Sobat flappet lark (Mirafra rufocinnamomea), a species of lark which is widespread in Africa

== See also ==
- Sobatu (also S̄obātū or Şoḩbatū), a small, rural village in Fars Province, Iran
- Soba (disambiguation)
