= Dianra =

- Town, sub-prefecture, and commune
- Location in Ivory Coast
- Coordinates: 8°46′N 6°15′W
- Country: Ivory Coast
- District: Woroba
- Region: Béré
- Department: Dianra

Area
  - Total: 1,570 km^{2} (610 sq mi)

Population (2021 census)
  - Total: 61,527
  - Density: 39.2/km^{2} (101/sq mi)
  - Town: 25,880
- (2014 census)
- Time zone: UTC+0 (GMT)

Dianra is a town in north-western Ivory Coast. It is a sub-prefecture of and the seat of Dianra Department in Béré Region, Woroba District. Dianra is also a commune. In 2021, the population of the sub-prefecture of Dianra was 61,527.

== Villages ==
The twenty four villages of the sub-prefecture of Dianra and their population in 2014 are:

1. Cissédougou (302)
2. Dalagbè (1 451)
3. Dianra (25 880)
4. Diarradougou (432)
5. Diembé (575)
6. Fila-Faraba (831)
7. Gbatosso (2 055)
8. Gbondiélé (1 016)
9. Gbongougo 1 (127)
10. Gbongougo 2 (138)
11. Gominasso (2 947)
12. Katiali (719)
13. Korotou (682)
14. Lalogo (5 318)
15. Lenguédougou (1 205)
16. Locolo (2 147)
17. Manadougou (337)
18. Niondje (576)
19. Ouahiéré (1 886)
20. Samoukaha (1 608)
21. Séfigué (1 153)
22. Sienkounon (324)
23. Solifono (843)
24. Yérétiélé (1 148)
