= Worofla =

- Town, sub-prefecture, and commune
- Location in Ivory Coast
- Coordinates: 8°16′N 6°54′W
- Country: Ivory Coast
- District: Woroba
- Region: Worodougou
- Department: Séguéla

Population (2014)
  - Total: 44,821
- Time zone: UTC+0 (GMT)

Worofla is a town in western Ivory Coast. It is a sub-prefecture and commune of Séguéla Department in Worodougou Region, Woroba District.

In 2014, the population of the sub-prefecture of Worofla was 44,821.

== Villages ==
The thirty villages of the sub-prefecture of Worofla and their population in 2014 are:

1. Bagabasso (1 177)
2. Bananigoro (84)
3. Bangana (991)
4. Bonna (242)
5. Béhéma (2 333)
6. Dabala (470)
7. Dougougbè (825)
8. Gbimanan (4 208)
9. Gbémazo (1 381)
10. Gbétogo (9 125)
11. Kangana (744)
12. Karaba (1 107)
13. Kato (2 551)
14. Kognimasso (342)
15. Kohimon (1 632)
16. Kondogo (626)
17. Kouégo (3 045)
18. Kéyé (344)
19. Lohou (2 519)
20. Mankono (1 576)
21. Massala (390)
22. Monso (283)
23. N'gonwo (570)
24. Soko (2 777)
25. Séhéla (317)
26. Tiéma (1 120)
27. Worofla (1 791)
28. Yamonzo (881)
29. Yanfissa (359)
30. Zogbogba (1 011)
