= Seo =

SEO, or search engine optimization, is the practice and strategies of increasing online visibility.

Seo, seo, or SEO may also refer to:

== Organizations ==
- SEO Economic Research, a scientific institute
- Spanish Ornithological Society (Sociedad Española de Ornitología)
- Suomalainen Energiaosuuskunta (FI), an common Finnish Gas station coop, commonly branded as "SEO"

== People ==
- Seo (surname), a Korean and Japanese family name
- SEO (artist), or Seo Soo-kyoung (born 1977), a Korean painter in Berlin

== Places ==
- Serving Every Ohioan Library Center, Caldwell, Ohio, United States
- Seo, Kohistan, an administrative unit in Khyber Pakhtunkhwa, Pakistan
- Seo (瀬尾村), a former village that was merged into Imaichi, Tochigi, now itself also merged into Nikkō, Tochigi Prefecture, Japan
- Västra Götaland County, a county in Sweden (ISO 3166 code: SE-O)
- Séguéla Airport, an airport in Ivory Coast (IATA code: SEO)

== Other uses ==
- Can Seo, a television series
- Seasoned equity offering, a new equity issue by a company after its initial public offering
- Security Engineering Officer, in security engineering
- Senior Executive Officer, a grade within the United Kingdom's Civil Service
- Socio-Economic Objective, an Australian Standard Research Classification from the Australian Bureau of Statistics
- State electoral office, a body which oversees elections
- Site enhancement oil, an oil used by bodybuilders to increase the apparent size of some muscles
- Asaba language (ISO 639-3 code: seo)

== See also ==
- Seo-gu (disambiguation)
