= Kamalo =

Kamalo may refer to:

- Kamalo, Ivory Coast
- Kamalo, Sierra Leone
