= Amara Konaté =

Amara Konaté may refer to:

- Amara Konaté (Ivorian footballer) (born 1990), Ivorian football player
- Amara Konate (Guinean footballer) (born 1999), Guinean football player
