= Fadiadougou =

Fadiadougou Fadyadougou
- Town and sub-prefecture
- Location in Ivory Coast
- Coordinates: 8°42′N 6°37′W
- Country: Ivory Coast
- District: Woroba
- Region: Worodougou
- Department: Kani

Population (2014)
  - Total: 15,066
- Time zone: UTC+0 (GMT)

Fadiadougou (also spelled Fadyadougou) is a town in north-western Ivory Coast. It is a sub-prefecture of Kani Department in Worodougou Region, Woroba District.

Fadiadougou was a commune until March 2012, when it became one of 1,126 communes nationwide that were abolished.

In 2014, the population of the sub-prefecture of Fadiadougou was 15,066.

== Villages ==
The nine villages of the sub-prefecture of Fadiadougou and their population in 2014 are:

1. Bafritou (2,948)
2. Banandjé (2,295)
3. Batogo (833)
4. Djélisso (2,103)
5. Fadjadougou (4,697)
6. Lipara (778)
7. Massasso-Senoufo (119)
8. Migniniba (775)
9. Minigninidéni (518)
