= Amara Konaté (Ivorian footballer) =

Ivorian footballer

Personal information
- Date of birth: 3 September 1990 (age 36)
- Place of birth: Kongasso, Ivory Coast
- Height: 1.80 m (5 ft 11 in)
- Position: Forward

Team information
- Current team: ASD San Sebastiano FC

Youth career
- 2008–2009: Marseille
- 2009–2010: Parma

Senior career*
Years	Team	Apps	(Gls)
2010–2013	Parma	0	(0)
2011	→ Crociati Noceto (loan)	13	(2)
2011–2012	→ Fondi (loan)	30	(3)
2012–2013	→ Nuovo Campobasso (loan)	12	(2)
2013–2014	Roma	0	(0)
2013–2014	→ Lleida Esportiu B (loan)	12	(13)
2014	→ Lleida Esportiu (loan)	7	(1)
2014–2015	Lentigione Calcio		
2015	Cavese	0	(0)
2015–2016	US Fezzanese	2	(0)
2016–2017	Gragnano	29	(6)
2017	Pomigliano	11	(2)
2017–2018	Portici 1906	16	(0)
2018	Puteolana		
2018–2019	ASD Pratovecchio		
2020	ACD San Tommaso	8	(2)
2020–2022	Aurora Alto Casertano		
2022–	ASD San Sebastiano FC		
- * Club domestic league appearances and goals as of 20:03, 8 October 2026 (UTC)

Amara Konaté (born 3 September 1990) is an Ivorian footballer who plays as a forward for ASD San Sebastiano FC.

== Football career ==
Born in Kongasso, Konaté joined Parma FC's academy at the age of 19. He never appeared officially for the senior side, however, being successively loaned to Lega Pro Seconda Divisione clubs Crociati Noceto, Fondi Calcio and Polisportiva Nuovo Campobasso Calcio and being released in 2013.
