= Kamalo, Ivory Coast =

Kamalo
- Town and sub-prefecture
- Location in Ivory Coast
- Coordinates: 7°52′N 7°1′W
- Country: Ivory Coast
- District: Woroba
- Region: Worodougou
- Department: Séguéla

Population (2014)
  - Total: 9,783
- Time zone: UTC+0 (GMT)

Kamalo is a town in western Ivory Coast. It is a sub-prefecture of Séguéla Department in Worodougou Region, Woroba District.

Kamalo was a commune until March 2012, when it became one of 1,126 communes nationwide that were abolished. In 2014, the population of the sub-prefecture of Kamalo was 9,783.

== Villages ==
The twelve villages of the sub-prefecture of Kamalo and their population in 2014 are:

1. Bac-Sémien (1,643)
2. Bingoro (1,117)
3. Diakro (278)
4. Djomon (352)
5. Kamalo (670)
6. Kohola (51)
7. Lahoua (227)
8. Massala-Gouran (839)
9. Sagoura-Dougoula (1,029)
10. Sagoura-Sanon (234)
11. Talla (3,101)
12. Touna (242)
