= Tiéningboué =

- Town, sub-prefecture, and commune
- Location in Ivory Coast
- Coordinates: 8°11′N 5°43′W
- Country: Ivory Coast
- District: Woroba
- Region: Béré
- Department: Mankono

Population (2014)
  - Total: 41,218
- Time zone: UTC+0 (GMT)

Tiéningboué is a town in central Ivory Coast. It is a sub-prefecture and commune of Mankono Department in Béré Region, Woroba District. In 2014, the population of the sub-prefecture of Tiéningboué was 41,218.

== Villages ==
The 30 villages of the sub-prefecture of Tiéningboué and their population in 2014 are:

1. Bagao (1,843)
2. Barandakoro (576)
3. Bonasso (310)
4. Dabakalatou (745)
5. Dangbasso (568)
6. Diakobou (1,141)
7. Dialakoro (6,927)
8. Gbingoro (511)
9. Gouéko (269)
10. Kalifadougou (703)
11. Kamarala (627)
12. Kobadallah (2,380)
13. Kokouna (970)
14. Koromabla (1,209)
15. Kouakoudougou (341)
16. Mondougou (1,044)
17. N'guessédougou (283)
18. Niangourala-Kamagaté (1,460)
19. Niangourala-Tiéné (1,243)
20. Niantibo (1,583)
21. Ninakiri (1,241)
22. Notiéna (359)
23. Ouédallah (2,577)
24. Pokoundougou (650)
25. Pokoutou (952)
26. Soundougoutou (671)
27. Sounoukana (990)
28. Tangola (513)
29. Tiéfindougou (1,055)
30. Tiéningboué (7,477)
