= Bouandougou =

- Town and sub-prefecture
- Location in Ivory Coast
- Coordinates: 8°13′N 5°40′W
- Country: Ivory Coast
- District: Woroba
- Region: Béré
- Department: Mankono

Population (2014)
  - Total: 35,671
- Time zone: UTC+0 (GMT)

Bouandougou is a town in central Ivory Coast. It is a sub-prefecture of Mankono Department in Béré Region, Woroba District.

Bouandougou was a commune until March 2012, when it became one of 1,126 communes nationwide that were abolished. In 2014, the population of the sub-prefecture of Bouandougou was 35,671.

== Villages ==
The twenty-one villages of the sub-prefecture of Bouandougou and their population in 2014 are:

1. Babadougou (443)
2. Bada (2,797)
3. Baradougou Dierré (1,361)
4. Baradougou-Diemba (424)
5. Diétiguisso (1,484)
6. Diorodougou (101)
7. Fourougbankoro (722)
8. Guesso Bonosso (835)
9. Kamoro (1,016)
10. Kpalé (962)
11. Ligbisso (568)
12. Linguékoro (229)
13. Lokpasso (592)
14. Lolo (544)
15. Ménéménétou (412)
16. Nakara (6,992)
17. Okoudougou (2,209)
18. Safodougou (1,365)
19. Tabakoro-Dierré (1,190)
20. Tabakoro-Dioulasso (302)
21. Takanazo-Moussosso (581)
