= Bobi Sourander =

Finnish-Swedish author and journalist

- Born: December 15, 1928; Kemi, Finland
- Died: October 16, 2009 (aged 80); Stockholm, Sweden
- Occupations: Author; Journalist
- Known for: Writing crime novels Being detaiend by the Chilean military regime in 1973
- Spouse: Ewa Sourander

Bobi Sourander (15 December 1928 in Kemi, Finland – 16 October 2008 in Stockholm, Sweden) was a Finnish-Swedish author and journalist covering stories for Dagens Nyheter in Latin America from 1969 to 1974. He belonged to the Swedish-speaking minority of Finland, and started working for Dagens Nyheter in 1964.

He reported directly from Santiago at the 1973 Chilean coup d'état. One month after the coup, he was imprisoned and placed in the infamous National Stadium in Santiago which was filled with nearly two thousand political prisoners. Sourander was released after two weeks of detention, but was expelled from Chile.

Sourander debuted as a crime writer in 1984 with the political thriller Ett kilo diamanter after which followed five more books, the last one, Förlorarna (1995), dealt with the murder of Olof Palme.

He was married to Ewa and he had two children from his earlier marriages.

== Bibliography ==
- Ett kilo diamanter (1984)
- En hjältes liv (1985)
- Bara action räknas (1988)
- Farväl Fidel (1990)
- Vinnarna (1993)
- Förlorarna (1995)

== Prizes and awards ==
- Debutant-diplomet 1984
- Guldpennan 1986
