= Dianra-Village =

- Town and sub-prefecture
- Location in Ivory Coast
- Coordinates: 8°43′N 6°15′W
- Country: Ivory Coast
- District: Woroba
- Region: Béré
- Department: Dianra

Area
  - Total: 1,490 km^{2} (580 sq mi)

Population (2021 census)
  - Total: 57,619
  - Density: 38.7/km^{2} (100/sq mi)
  - Town: 10,822
- (2014 census)
- Time zone: UTC+0 (GMT)

Dianra-Village is a town in north-western Ivory Coast. It is a sub-prefecture of Dianra Department in Béré Region, Woroba District.

Dianra-Village was a commune until March 2012, when it became one of 1,126 communes nationwide that were abolished. In 2021, the population of the sub-prefecture of Dianra-Village was 57,619.

== Villages ==
The nineteen villages of the sub-prefecture of Dianra-Village and their population in 2014 are:

1. Balladougou (607)
2. Bébédougou (164)
3. Dianra-Village (10,822)
4. Djénéni (1,115)
5. Faraba (5,934)
6. Kafégué (1,574)
7. Kan-Sokoura (884)
8. Kodjodougou (1,035)
9. Lessoumasso (2,526)
10. Maghan (1,253)
11. N'guissidougou (1,379)
12. Nondjoni (1,910)
13. Pétérikaha (315)
14. Sononzo (6,597)
15. Sononzo-Sokoura (1,330)
16. Tamafrou (2,599)
17. Tienvolokaha (1,194)
18. Tomikro (872)
19. Toutey (386)
