= Sobatu =

Sobatu ثباتو
- Village
- Location within Iran
- Coordinates: 28°52′00″N 53°38′00″E
- Country: Iran
- Province: Fars
- County: Fasa
- Bakhsh: Central
- Rural District: Sahrarud

Population (2006)
  - Total: 64
- Time zone: UTC+3:30 (IRST)
  - Summer (DST): UTC+4:30 (IRDT)

Sobatu (Persian: ثباتو, also Romanized as S̄obātū; also known as Şoḩbatū) is a village in Sahrarud Rural District, in the Central District of Fasa County, Fars province, Iran. At the 2006 census, its population was 64, in 12 families.
