= Soba, Korhogo =

Soba
- Neighbourhood of Korhogo
- Location in Ivory Coast
- Coordinates: 9°27′N 5°38′W
- Country: Ivory Coast
- District: Savanes
- Region: Poro
- Department: Korhogo
- Sub-prefecture: Korhogo
- Time zone: UTC+0 (GMT)

Soba is a neighbourhood of Korhogo, a city in northern Ivory Coast. It is located in the southeast quarter of the city.

Soba was a commune until March 2012, when it became one of 1,126 communes nationwide that were abolished.
