= Bobi-Diarabana =

- Sub-prefecture
- Location in Ivory Coast
- Coordinates: 8°11′N 6°37′W
- Country: Ivory Coast
- District: Woroba
- Region: Worodougou
- Department: Séguéla

Population (2014)
  - Total: 25,249
- Time zone: UTC+0 (GMT)

Bobi-Diarabana is a sub-prefecture in north-western Ivory Coast. It is in Séguéla Department, Worodougou Region, Woroba District. The seat of the sub-prefecture is the town of Diarabana.

Bobi-Diarabana is one of the few sub-prefectures in Ivory Coast that does not have the same name as its seat.

Bobi-Diarabana was a commune until March 2012, when it became one of 1,126 communes nationwide that were abolished.
