= Séguéla Airport =

Airport in Ivory Coast

Séguéla Airport Aéroport de Séguéla
- IATA: SEO; ICAO: DISG

Summary
- Airport type: Public
- Serves: Séguéla, Côte d'Ivoire
- Elevation AMSL: 322 m / 1,056 ft
- Coordinates: 7°57′36″N 006°38′39″W

Map
- Location in Côte d'Ivoire

Runways
Direction	Length		Surface
Direction	m	ft	Surface
02/20	1,950	6,398	Asphalt

Séguéla Airport (French: Aéroport de Séguéla) (IATA: SEO, ICAO: DISG) is an airport serving Séguéla, a town in Côte d'Ivoire. It is located about 3 kilometres (1.9 mi) to the east of the town. The airport has one runway measuring 1,950 metres (6,400 ft) that will be asphalted.

== Infrastructure ==
Séguéla Airport has one runway with dimensions 1,950 by 40 metres (6,400 ft × 130 ft). During a July 2015 press conference in Séguéla, President Alassane Ouattara said that the runway would be asphalted by 2020 at a cost of 7 billion West African CFA francs.

== See also ==
- Transport in Côte d'Ivoire
