= Kani, Ivory Coast =

Kani
- Town, sub-prefecture, and commune
- Location in Ivory Coast
- Coordinates: 8°29′N 6°36′W
- Country: Ivory Coast
- District: Woroba
- Region: Worodougou
- Department: Kani

Population (2014)
  - Total: 31,211
- Time zone: UTC+0 (GMT)

Kani is a town in north-western Ivory Coast. It is a sub-prefecture of and the seat of Kani Department in Worodougou Region, Woroba District. Kani is also a commune. In 2014, the population of the sub-prefecture of Kani was 31,211.

== Villages ==
The fifteen villages of the sub-prefecture of Kani and their population in 2014 are:

1. Banagoro (300)
2. Gbédéguéla (1 523)
3. Kani (8 908)
4. Katogbo (912)
5. Komatou (883)
6. Tabakoroni (532)
7. Tiesso (453)
8. Babasso (1 782)
9. Frototou (1 677)
10. Kabélékoro (275)
11. Manabri (2 611)
12. Massasso-Bas-Yani (2 326)
13. Silakoro (1 708)
14. Soba (2 419)
15. Wongué (4 902)
