= Marandallah =

Marandallah Marandalah; Marandala
- Town and sub-prefecture
- Location in Ivory Coast
- Coordinates: 8°27′N 5°55′W
- Country: Ivory Coast
- District: Woroba
- Region: Béré
- Department: Mankono

Population (2014)
  - Total: 36,074
- Time zone: UTC+0 (GMT)

Marandallah (also spelled Marandalah and Marandala) is a town in central Ivory Coast. It is a sub-prefecture of Mankono Department in Béré Region, Woroba District.

Marandallah was a commune until March 2012, when it became one of 1,126 communes nationwide that were abolished.

In 2014, the population of the sub-prefecture of Marandallah was 36,074.

== Villages ==
1. Bobosso-Tiénigbé (8,732)
2. Borozomba (430)
3. Brokodallan (1,274)
4. Dandougou (3,087)
5. Diédougou (486)
6. Dikodougou (1,008)
7. Farakoro (3,043)
8. Kankanazo (300)
9. Kouassidougou (1,216)
10. Kougbèré (1,199)
11. Kpesso (2,917)
12. Marandalah (3,083)
13. N'gbankoundougou (416)
14. Niankabi-Satama-Tabakoro (304)
15. Nonkoundougou (1,042)
16. Ouérébo (392)
17. Sanankoro (2,521)
18. Souanso (604)
19. Téguépé (2,854)
20. Tiassédougou (426)
21. Tioumoudougou (740)
