= Sarhala =

- Town, sub-prefecture, and commune
- Location in Ivory Coast
- Coordinates: 8°25′N 6°10′W
- Country: Ivory Coast
- District: Woroba
- Region: Béré
- Department: Mankono

Population (2014)
  - Total: 38,207
- Time zone: UTC+0 (GMT)

Sarhala is a town in northwestern Ivory Coast. It is a sub-prefecture and commune of Mankono Department in Béré Region, Woroba District. In 2014, the population of the sub-prefecture of Sarhala was 38,207.

== Villages ==
The twenty two villages of the sub-prefecture of Sarhala and their population in 2014 are:

1. Bamanasso (1 271)
2. Banangoro (816)
3. Biélou Carrefour (4 405)
4. Bikassi (1 177)
5. Bougounou (967)
6. Diarala (956)
7. Djémédougou (1 051)
8. Filasso (1 038)
9. Fizankoro (3 269)
10. Kandiédougou (1 244)
11. Kodoum (1 728)
12. Madina (1 899)
13. Ménéni 1 (989)
14. Ménéni 2 (616)
15. Missidougou (2 574)
16. Missirikoro (981)
17. Niarana (524)
18. Paniko (2 422)
19. Sarhala (4 399)
20. Siriho (2 514)
21. Somokoro (2 447)
22. Tabakoro (920)
