= Kongasso =

Kongasso Kongaso
- Town, sub-prefecture, and commune
- Location in Ivory Coast
- Coordinates: 7°49′N 6°5′W
- Country: Ivory Coast
- District: Woroba
- Region: Béré
- Department: Kounahiri

Population (2014)
  - Total: 35,642
- Time zone: UTC+0 (GMT)

Kongasso (also spelled Kongaso) is a town in central Ivory Coast. It is a sub-prefecture and commune of Kounahiri Department in Béré Region, Woroba District. In 2014, the population of the sub-prefecture of Kongasso was 35,642.

== Villages ==
The eighteen villages of the sub-prefecture of Kongasso and their population in 2014 are:

1. Boaka (3,739)
2. Bourounon (2,335)
3. Fouanga (2,705)
4. Gbaziasso (1,555)
5. Gbéma (1,651)
6. Guéasso (2,166)
7. Kabakoro (196)
8. Kavagouma (1,555)
9. Kongasso (4,714)
10. Korokopla (3,463)
11. Kounadidougou (480)
12. Tialouma (831)
13. Tiénigbé (2,120)
14. Tofesso (1,651)
15. Togbasso (1,954)
16. Toubalo (2,659)
17. Tulé (1,868)
