= Séguéla =

- Town, Sub-prefecture, and commune
- Location in Ivory Coast
- Coordinates: 7°58′N 6°40′W
- Country: Ivory Coast
- District: Woroba
- Region: Worodougou
- Department: Séguéla

Area
  - Total: 821 km^{2} (317 sq mi)

Population (2021 census)
  - Total: 103,980
  - Density: 127/km^{2} (328/sq mi)
  - Town: 46,189
- (2014 census)
- Time zone: UTC+0 (GMT)

Séguéla is a town in western Ivory Coast. It is the seat of both the Woroba District and the Worodougou Region. It is also a commune and the seat of and a sub-prefecture of Séguéla Department.

Séguéla is served by Séguéla Airport. In 2021, the population of the sub-prefecture of Séguéla was 103,905.

== Villages ==
The forty two villages of the sub-prefecture of Séguéla and their population in 2014 are:

1. Bemasso (143)
2. Fizanigoro (195)
3. Gbena (1 307)
4. Séguéla (46 189)
5. Banandjé (363)
6. Békro (174)
7. Dangbasso (371)
8. Diarabala (212)
9. Djamina (359)
10. Flana (166)
11. Gbalo (649)
12. Gbéna (212)
13. Gbingoro (648)
14. Gbofraka (348)
15. Gbohovo (371)
16. Gbolo (532)
17. Gbona (589)
18. Gnahoulégo (244)
19. Kamana (284)
20. Kavéna (333)
21. Kénégbè-Sud (589)
22. Kromina (196)
23. Linguékro (477)
24. Mamourla (282)
25. Manguilo (138)
26. Ména (250)
27. Messoromasso (176)
28. Mouina (767)
29. Niangoro (232)
30. Ouahama (1 050)
31. Ouahi (685)
32. Ouéla Katogola Ou Djiguibasso (349)
33. Sakouasso (177)
34. Séna (410)
35. Siakasso 1 (724)
36. Soba (635)
37. Sokoura (163)
38. Somina (427)
39. Sotiéma (118)
40. Sualla (499)
41. Téguéla (1 579)
42. Trafesso (162)

== Notable people ==
- Ibrahima Bakayoko (born 1976) - footballer
- Ibrahim Méité (born 1976) - sprinter
- Christ Tapé (born 2006) - footballer
