= Mankono =

- Town, sub-prefecture, and commune
- Location in Ivory Coast
- Coordinates: 8°3′N 6°11′W
- Country: Ivory Coast
- District: Woroba
- Region: Béré
- Department: Mankono

Area
  - Total: 1,990 km^{2} (770 sq mi)

Population (2021 census)
  - Total: 74,165
  - Density: 37.3/km^{2} (96.5/sq mi)
  - Town: 15,118
- (2014 census)
- Time zone: UTC+0 (GMT)

Mankono is a town in central Ivory Coast and the seat of Béré Region, Woroba District. It is a sub-prefecture of and the seat of Mankono Department. Mankono is also a commune.

Beninese politician Marie-Elise Gbèdo was born on 29 December 1954 in Mankono.

In 2021, the population of the sub-prefecture of Mankono was 74,165.

== Villages ==
The twenty seven villages of the sub-prefecture of Mankono and their population in 2014 are:

1. Borohouléma (815)
2. Brahima (2,866)
3. Dantogo (1,094)
4. Dawala (2,242)
5. Diénédjan (2,732)
6. Dobadougou (1,035)
7. Fizanlouma (1,695)
8. Gbangana-Gbouikoro (1,103)
9. Gbanviélo (1,531)
10. Gona (885)
11. Karamokola (4,071)
12. Kogolo (930)
13. Konotou (1,114)
14. Kouloukouloukoro (27)
15. Madian (1,866)
16. Maniékoro (1,407)
17. Mankono (15,118)
18. Mankono - Village (5,672)
19. Moussola (122)
20. Oussougoula (2,475)
21. Samorosso (300)
22. Sokourala (837)
23. Soungasso (2,684)
24. Tiéma (2,432)
25. Tomono (7,876)
26. Tondolo (978)
27. Touloukoro (423)
