= Kani Department =

Coordinates: 8°29′N 6°36′W

Kani Department Département de Kani
- Department
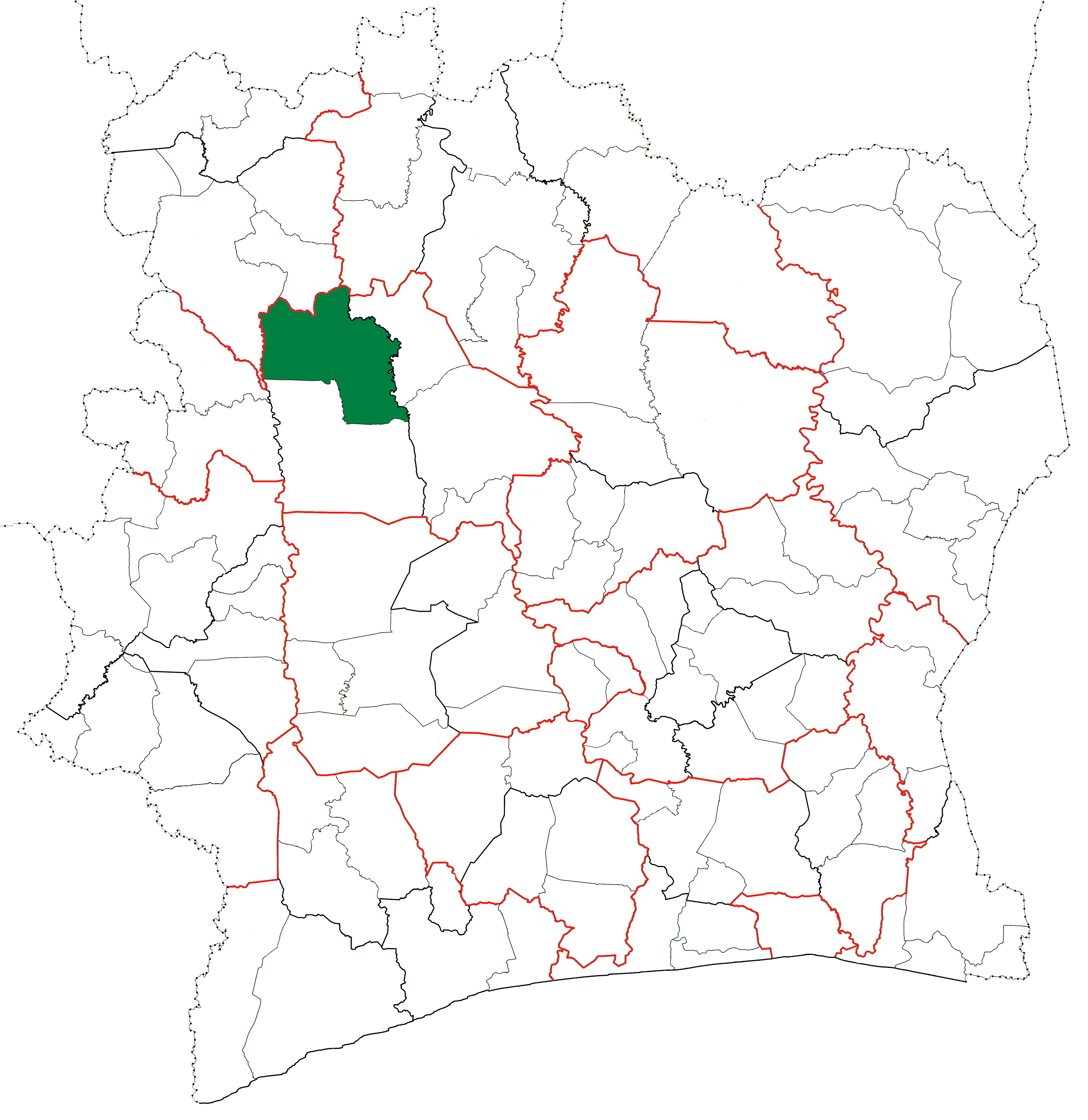
- Location in Ivory Coast. Kani Department has retained the same boundaries since its creation in 2009.
- Country: Ivory Coast
- District: Woroba
- Region: Worodougou
- 2009: Established as a second-level subdivision via a division of Séguéla Dept
- 2011: Converted to a third-level subdivision
- Departmental seat: Kani

Government
  - Prefect: Zama Christophe Dogo

Area
  - Total: 4,940 km^{2} (1,910 sq mi)

Population (2021 census)
  - Total: 131,428
  - Density: 26.6/km^{2} (68.9/sq mi)
- Time zone: UTC+0 (GMT)

Kani Department is a department of Worodougou Region in Woroba District, Ivory Coast. In 2021, its population was 131,428, and its seat was the settlement of Kani. The department’s sub-prefectures are Djibrosso, Fadiadougou, Kani, and Morondo.

== History ==
Kani Department was created in 2009 as a second-level subdivision via a split-off from Séguéla Department. At its creation, it was part of Worodougou Region.

In 2011, districts were introduced as new first-level subdivisions of Ivory Coast. At the same time, regions were reorganised and became second-level subdivisions and all departments were converted into third-level subdivisions. At this time, Kani Department remained part of the retained Worodougou Region in the new Woroba District.
