= Dianra Department =

Coordinates: 8°46′N 6°15′W

Dianra Department Département de Dianra
- Department
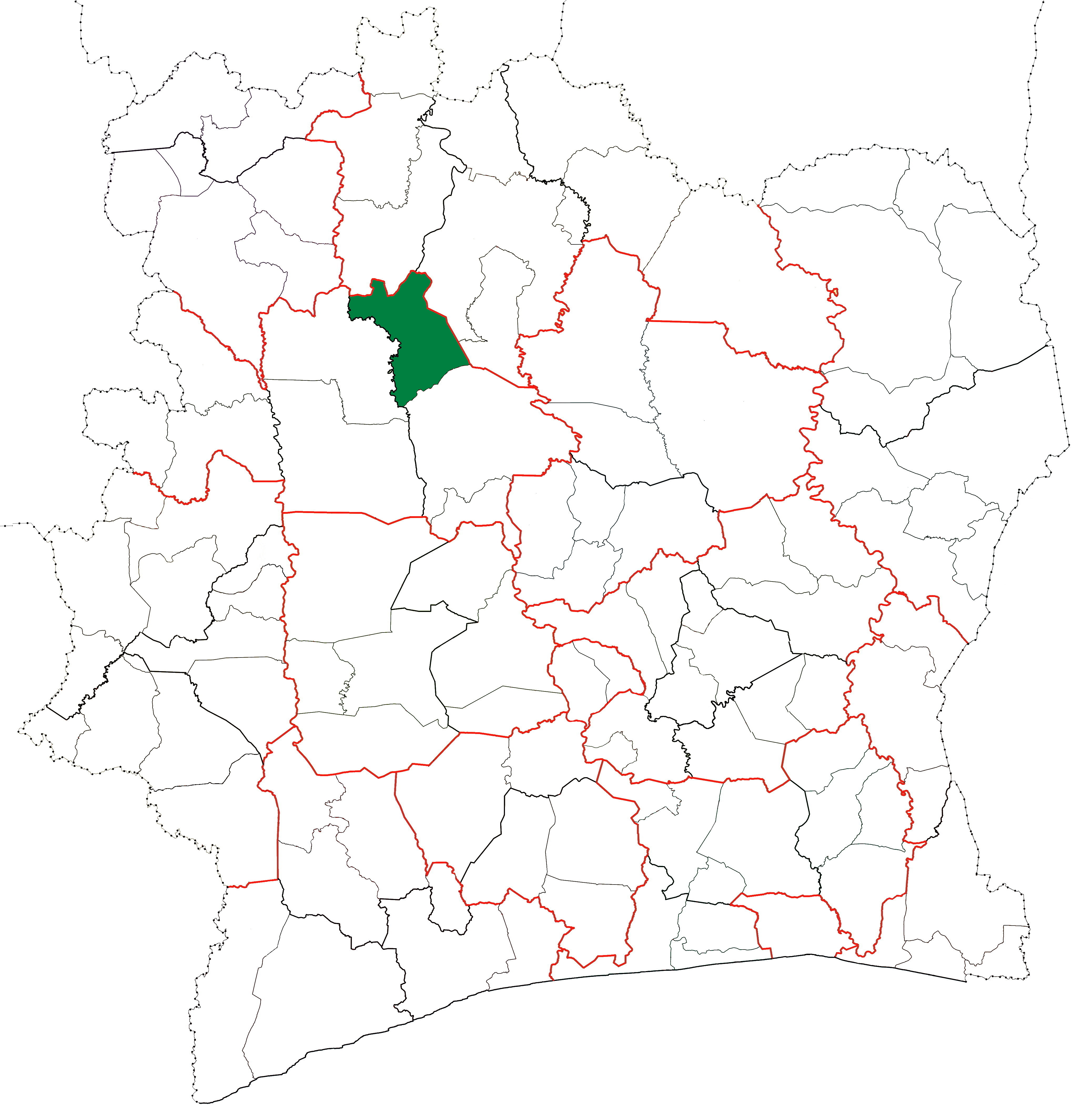
- Location in Ivory Coast. Dianra Department has retained the same boundaries since its creation in 2012.
- Country: Ivory Coast
- District: Woroba
- Region: Béré
- 2012: Established via a division of Mankono Dept
- Departmental seat: Dianra

Government
  - Prefect: Ba Blaise

Area
  - Total: 3,060 km^{2} (1,180 sq mi)

Population (2021 census)
  - Total: 119,146
  - Density: 38.9/km^{2} (101/sq mi)
- Time zone: UTC+0 (GMT)

Dianra Department is a department of Béré Region in Woroba District, Ivory Coast. In 2021, its population was 119,146 and its seat is the settlement of Dianra. The sub-prefectures of the department are Dianra and Dianra-Village.

== History ==
Dianra Department was created in 2012 by dividing Mankono Department.
