= Kounahiri Department =

Coordinates: 7°48′N 5°50′W

Kounahiri Department Département de Kounahiri
- Department
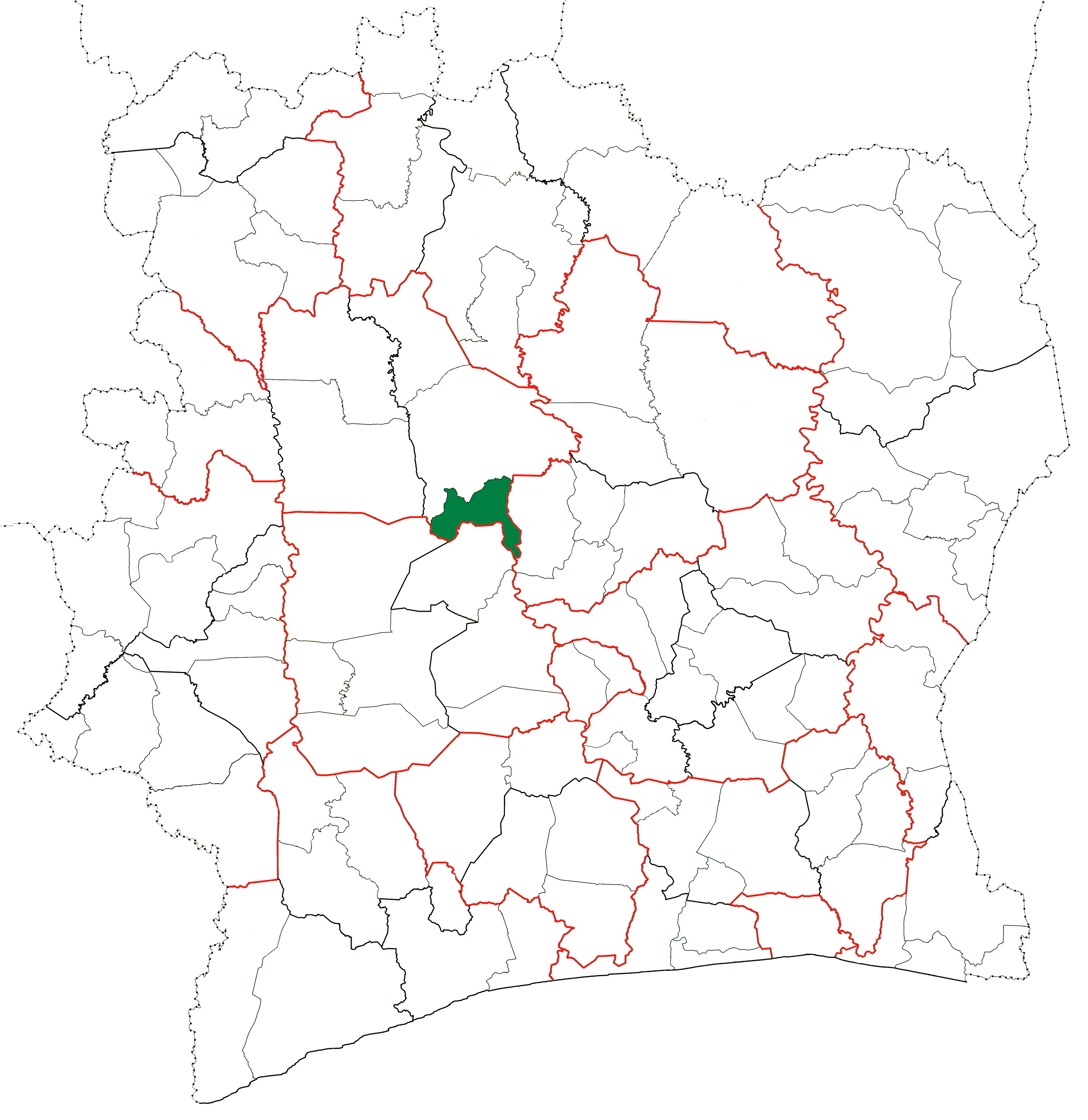
- Location in Ivory Coast. Kounahiri Department has retained the same boundaries since its creation in 2005.
- Country: Ivory Coast
- District: Woroba
- Region: Béré
- 2005: Established as a second-level subdivision via a division of Mankono Dept
- 2011: Converted to a third-level subdivision
- Departmental seat: Kounahiri

Government
  - Prefect: Célestin Womblégnon

Area
  - Total: 1,350 km^{2} (520 sq mi)

Population (2021)
  - Total: 101,111
  - Density: 74.9/km^{2} (194/sq mi)
- Time zone: UTC+0 (GMT)

Kounahiri Department is a department of Béré Region in Woroba District, Ivory Coast. In 2021, its population was 101,111 and its seat is the settlement of Kounahiri. The sub-prefectures of the department are Kongasso and Kounahiri.

== History ==
Kounahiri Department was created in 2005 as a second-level subdivision via a split-off from Mankono Department. At its creation, it was part of Worodougou Region.

In 2011, districts were introduced as new first-level subdivisions of Ivory Coast. At the same time, regions were reorganised and became second-level subdivisions and all departments were converted into third-level subdivisions. At this time, Kounahiri Department became part of Béré Region in Woroba District.
