= Séguéla Department =

Coordinates: 7°58′N 6°40′W

Séguéla Department Département de Séguéla
- Department
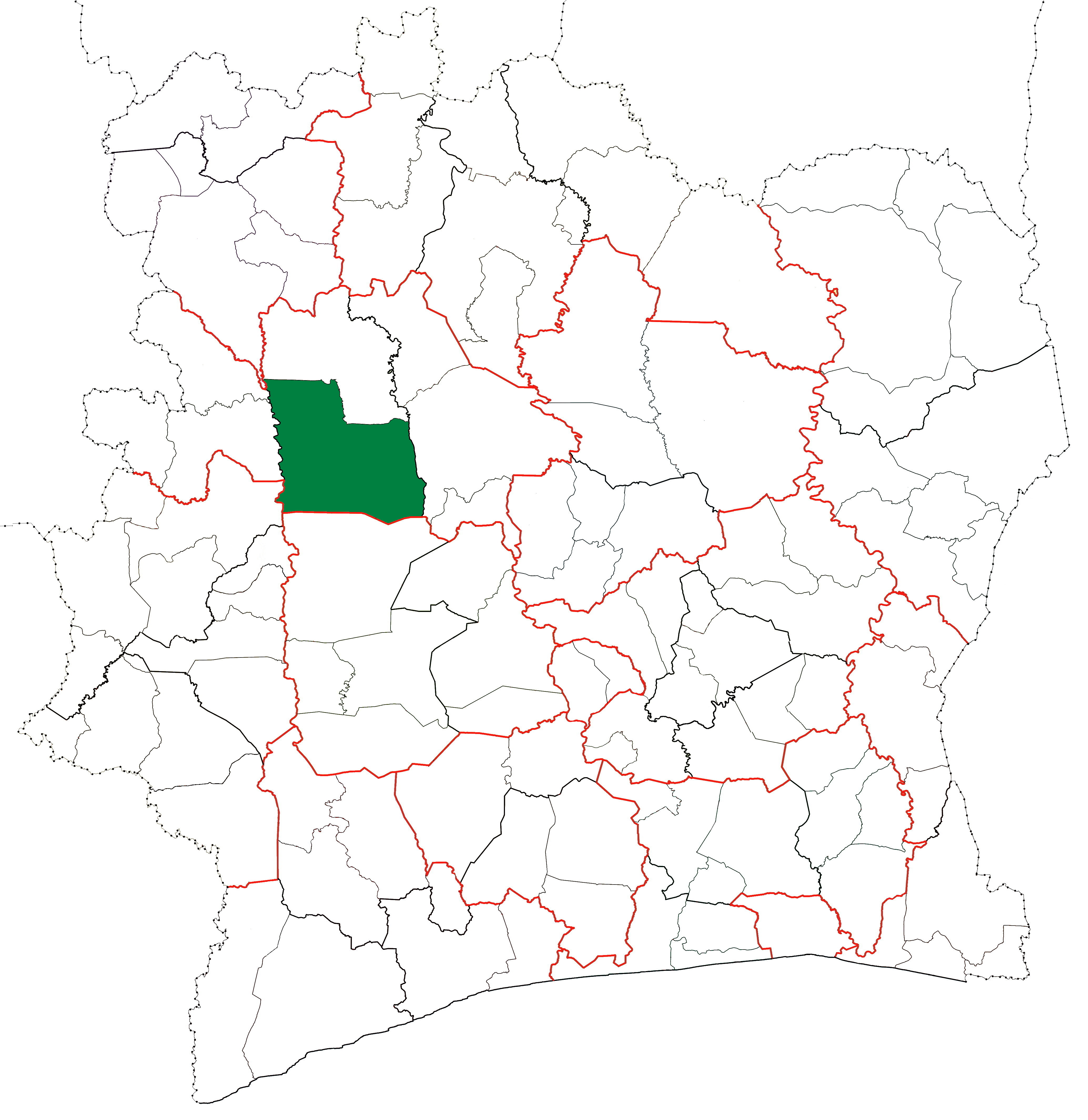
- Location in Ivory Coast. Séguéla Department has had these boundaries since 2009.
- Country: Ivory Coast
- District: Woroba
- Region: Worodougou
- 1969: Established as a first-level subdivision
- 1980: Divided to create Mankono Dept
- 1997: Converted to a second-level subdivision
- 2009: Divided to create Kani Dept
- 2011: Converted to a third-level subdivision
- Departmental seat: Séguéla

Government
  - Prefect: Moussa Bamba

Area
  - Total: 6,490 km^{2} (2,510 sq mi)

Population (2021 census)
  - Total: 298,384
  - Density: 46.0/km^{2} (119/sq mi)
- Time zone: UTC+0 (GMT)

Séguéla Department is a department of Worodougou Region in Woroba District, Ivory Coast. In 2021, its population was 298,384 and its seat is the settlement of Séguéla. The sub-prefectures of the department are Bobi-Diarabana, Dualla, Kamalo, Massala, Séguéla, Sifié, and Worofla.

== History ==
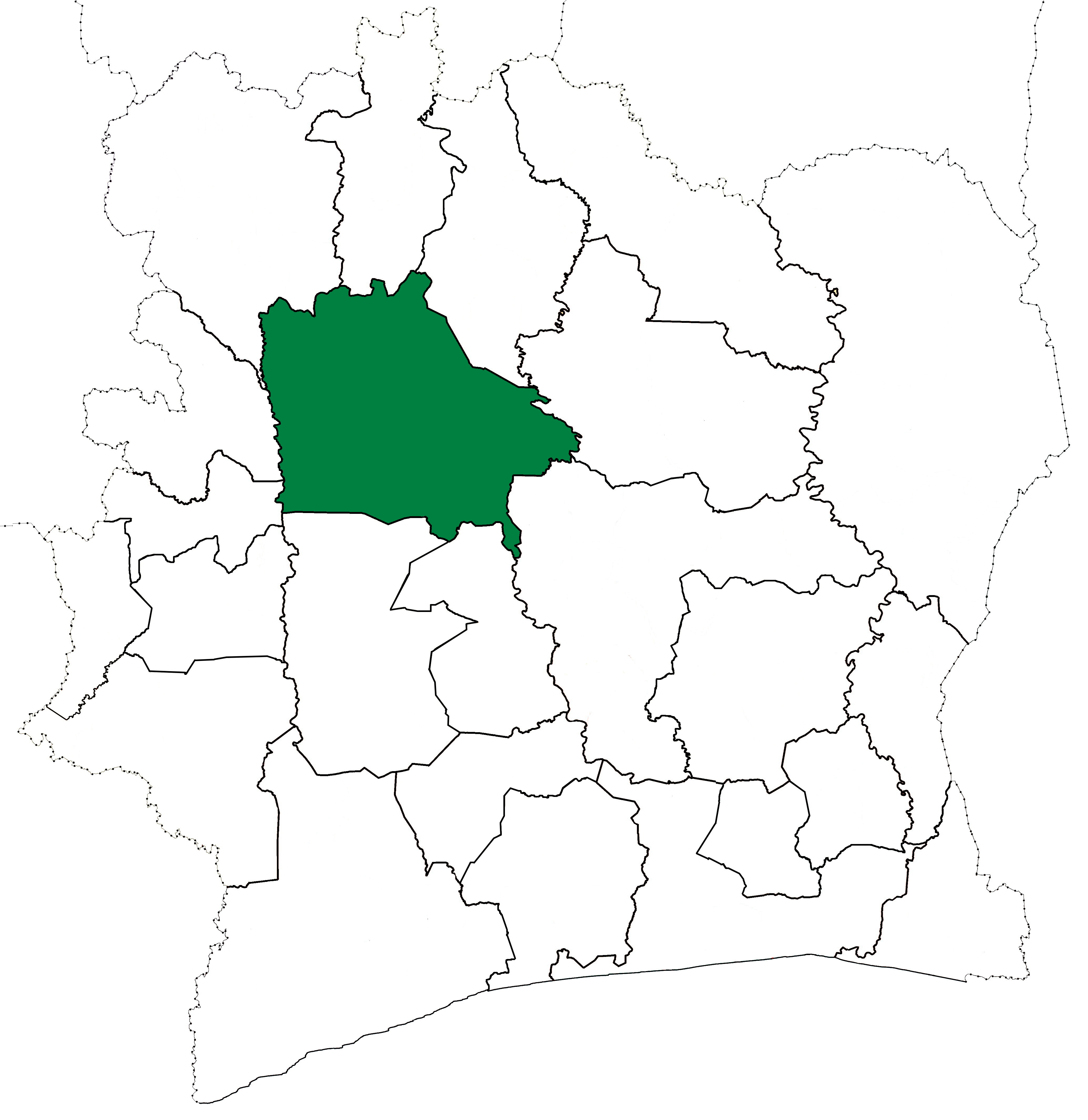
Séguéla Department upon its creation in 1969. It kept these boundaries until 1980, but other departments began to be divided in 1974.

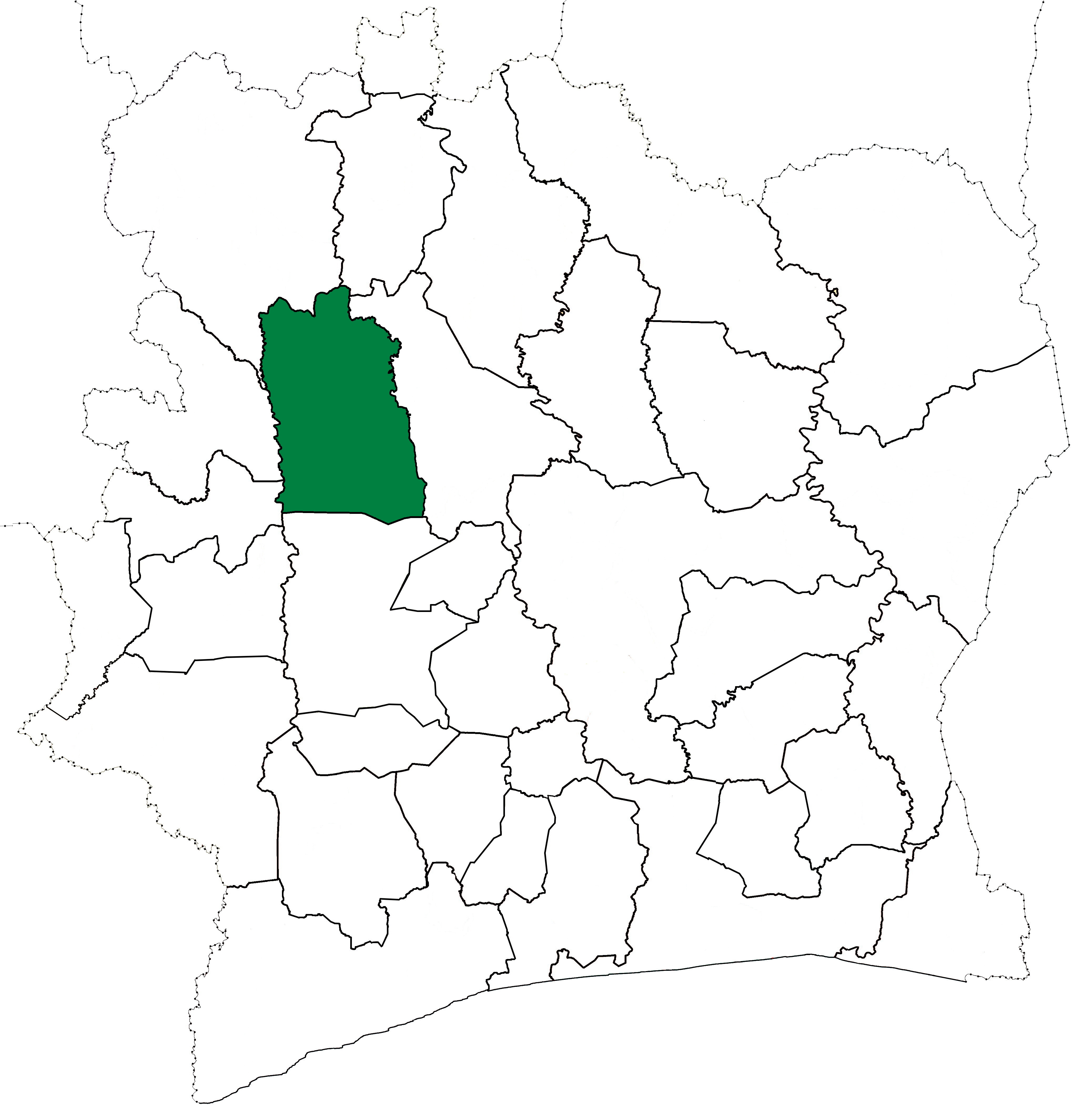
Séguéla Department from 1980 to 2009. (Other subdivision boundaries began to change in 1988.)

Séguéla Department was created in 1969 as one of the 24 new departments that were created to take the place of the six departments that were being abolished. It was created from territory that was formerly part of Nord Department. Using current boundaries as a reference, from 1969 to 1980 the department occupied the territory that is Worodougou Region and Béré Region.

In 1980, Séguéla Department was divided to create Mankono Department. In 1997, regions were introduced as new first-level subdivisions of Ivory Coast; as a result, all departments were converted into second-level subdivisions. Séguéla Department was included as part of Worodougou Region.

In 2009, what was left of Séguéla Department was divided again to create Kani Department.

In 2011, districts were introduced as new first-level subdivisions of Ivory Coast. At the same time, regions were reorganised and became second-level subdivisions and all departments were converted into third-level subdivisions. At this time, Séguéla Department remained part of the retained Worodougou Region in Woroba District.
