= Mankono Department =

Coordinates: 8°4′N 6°11′W

Mankono Department Département de Mankono
- Department
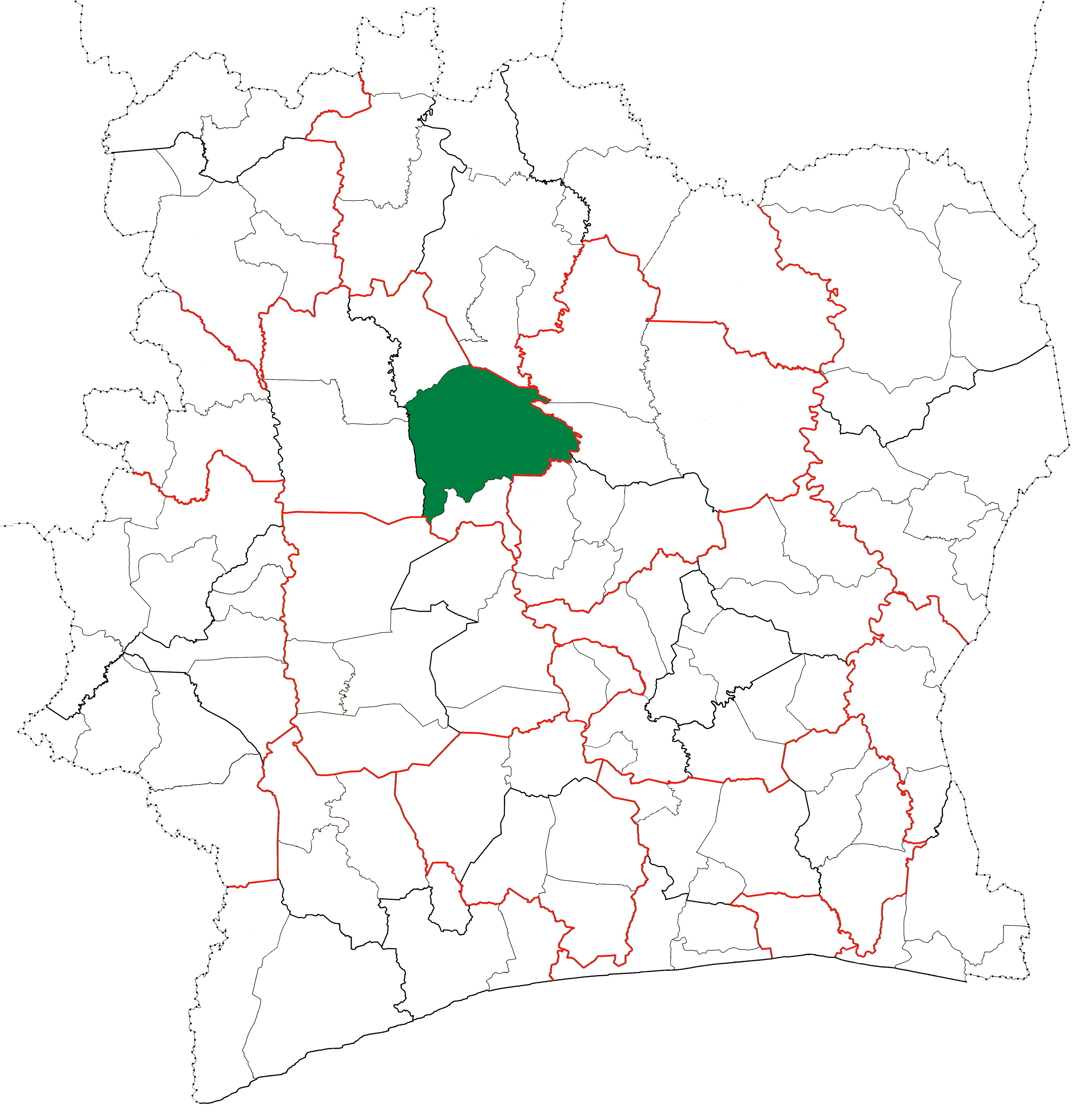
- Location in Ivory Coast. Mankono Department has had these boundaries since 2012.
- Country: Ivory Coast
- District: Woroba
- Region: Béré
- 1980: Established as a first-level subdivision via a division of Séguéla Dept
- 1997: Converted to a second-level subdivision
- 2005: Divided to create Kounahiri Dept
- 2011: Converted to a third-level subdivision
- 2012: Divided to create Dianra Dept
- Departmental seat: Mankono

Government
  - Prefect: Dago Rémi Adjé

Area
  - Total: 6,500 km^{2} (2,500 sq mi)

Population (2021 census)
  - Total: 271,894
  - Density: 42/km^{2} (110/sq mi)
- Time zone: UTC+0 (GMT)

Mankono Department is a department of Béré Region in Woroba District, Ivory Coast. In 2021, its population was 271,894 and its seat is the settlement of Mankono. The sub-prefectures of the department are Bouandougou, Mankono, Marandallah, Sarhala, and Tiéningboué.

== History ==
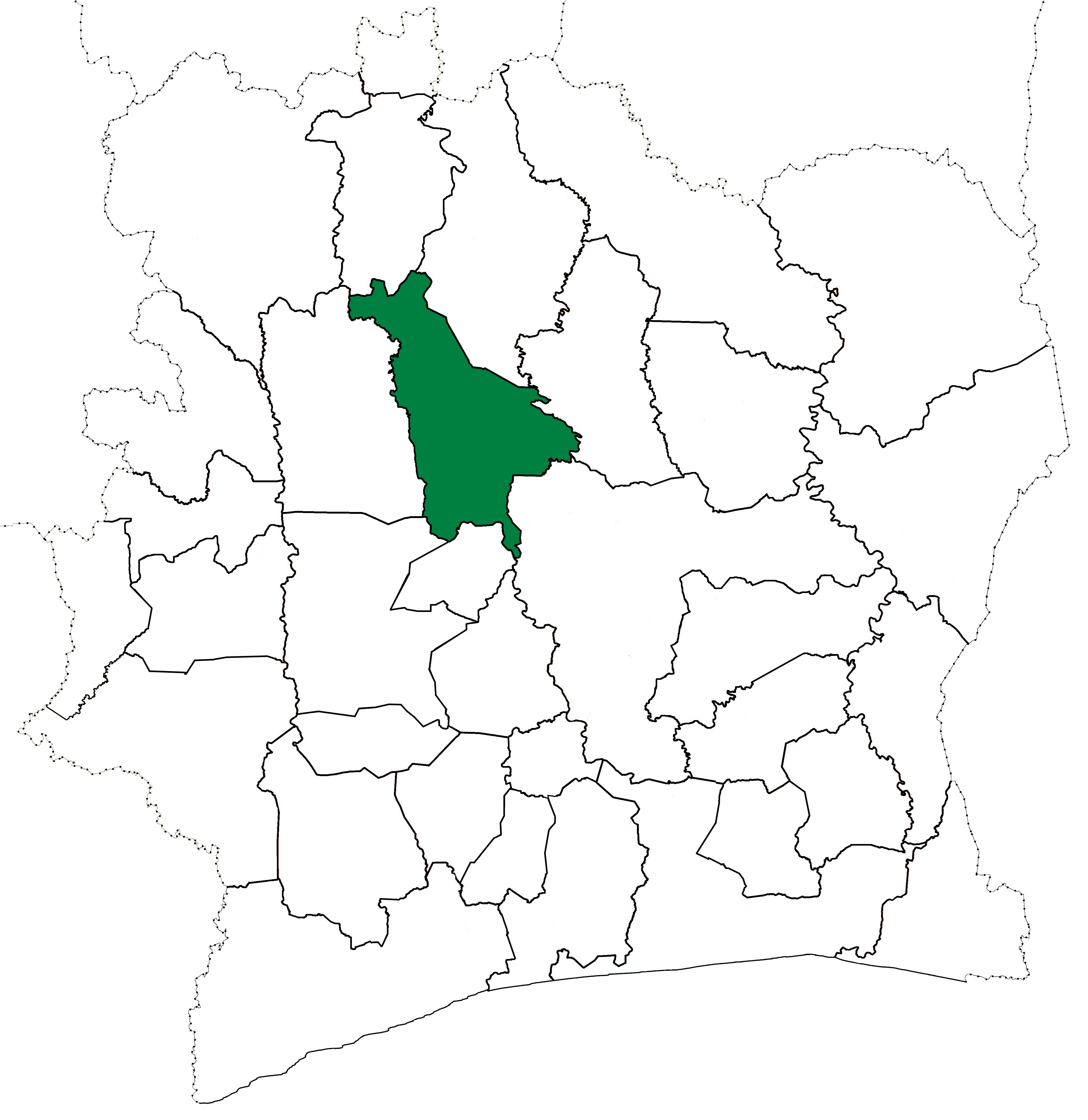
Mankono Department upon its creation in 1980. It kept these boundaries until 2005, but other subdivision boundary changes began to be made in 1988.

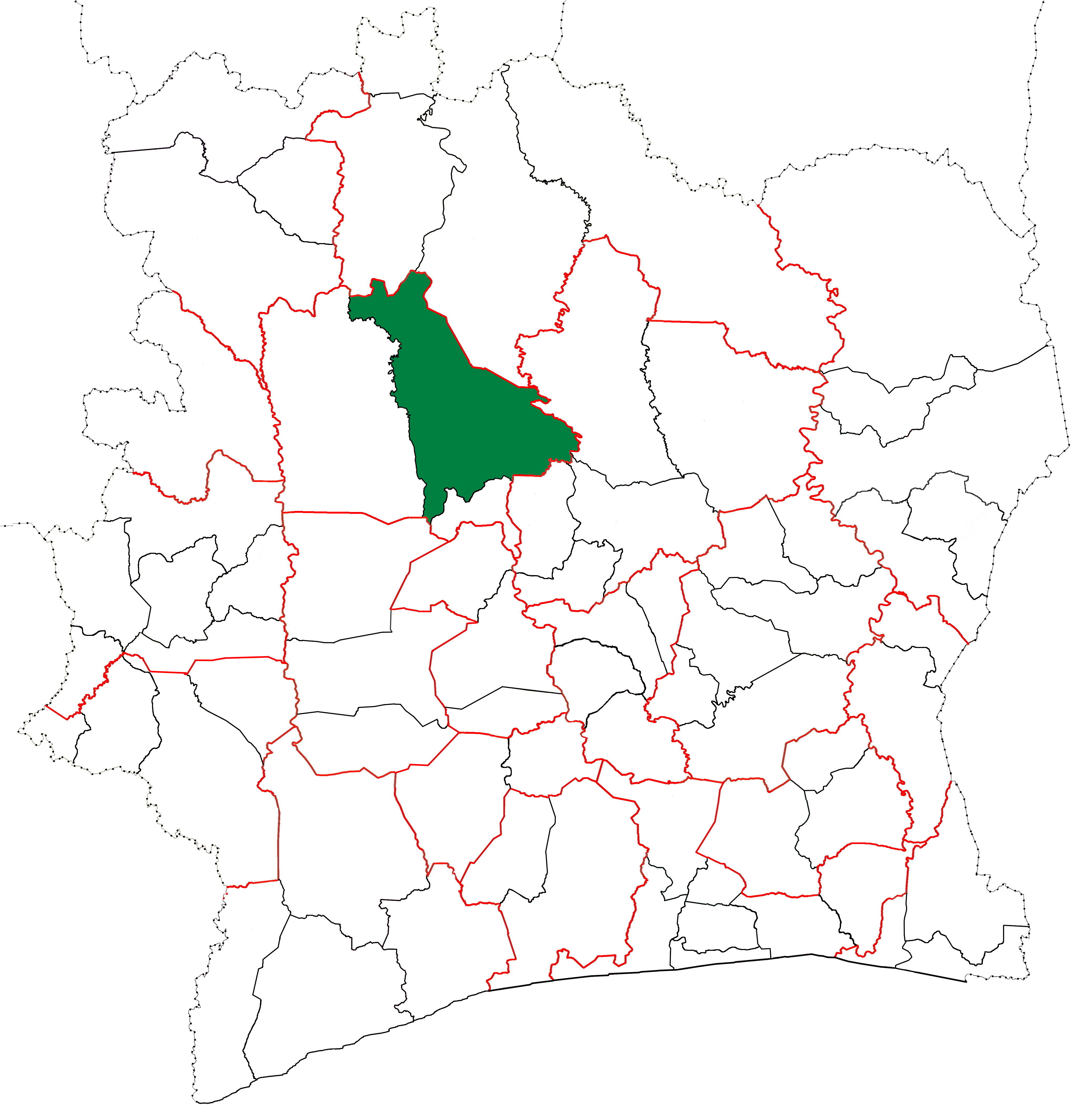
Mankono Department from 2005 to 2012. (Other subdivision boundaries began to change in 2008.)

Mankono Department was created in 1980 as a first-level subdivision via a split-off from Séguéla Department. Using current boundaries as a reference, from 1980 to 2005 the department occupied the same territory as Béré Region.

In 1997, regions were introduced as new first-level subdivisions of Ivory Coast; as a result, all departments were converted into second-level subdivisions. Mankono Department was included in Worodougou Region.

In 2005, Mankono Department was divided to create Kounahiri Department.

In 2011, districts were introduced as new first-level subdivisions of Ivory Coast. At the same time, regions were reorganised and became second-level subdivisions and all departments were converted into third-level subdivisions. At this time, Mankono Department became part of Béré Region in Woroba District.

In 2012, Mankono Department was divided again when two sub-prefectures were split-off to form Dianra Department.
