= Worodougou =

Coordinates: 8°30′N 6°20′W

Worodougou Region Région du Worodougou
- Region
- Seal

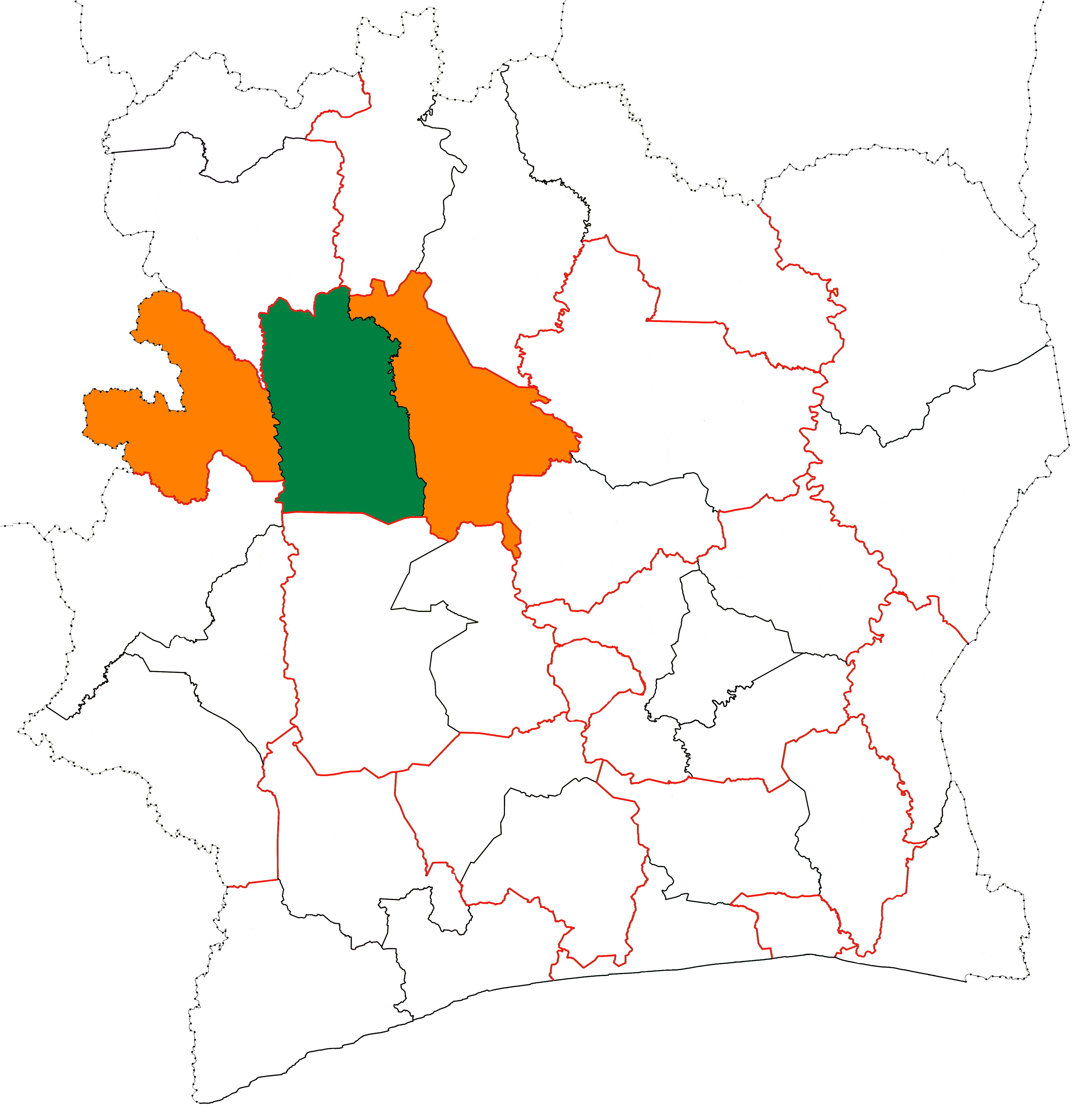
- Location of Worodougou Region (green) in Ivory Coast and in Woroba District
- Country: Ivory Coast
- District: Woroba
- 1997: Established as a first-level subdivision
- 2000: Divided to create Bafing Region
- 2011: Converted to a second-level subdivision
- 2011: Divided to create Béré Region
- Regional seat: Séguéla

Government
  - Prefect: Moussa Bamba
  - Council President: Bouaké Fofana

Area
  - Total: 11,430 km^{2} (4,410 sq mi)

Population (2021 census)
  - Total: 429,812
  - Density: 37.60/km^{2} (97.39/sq mi)
- Time zone: UTC+0 (GMT)
- Website: worodougou.org

Worodougou Region is one of the 31 regions of Ivory Coast and is currently one of three regions of Woroba District. The region's seat is Séguéla. The region's population in the 2021 census was 429,812.

== Departments ==
Worodougou is currently divided into two departments: Kani and Séguéla.

== History ==
Worodougou means 'land of kola' in Malinke. It was integrated into the Dyula trade networks centered on the Mali Empire by the 15th century at the latest.

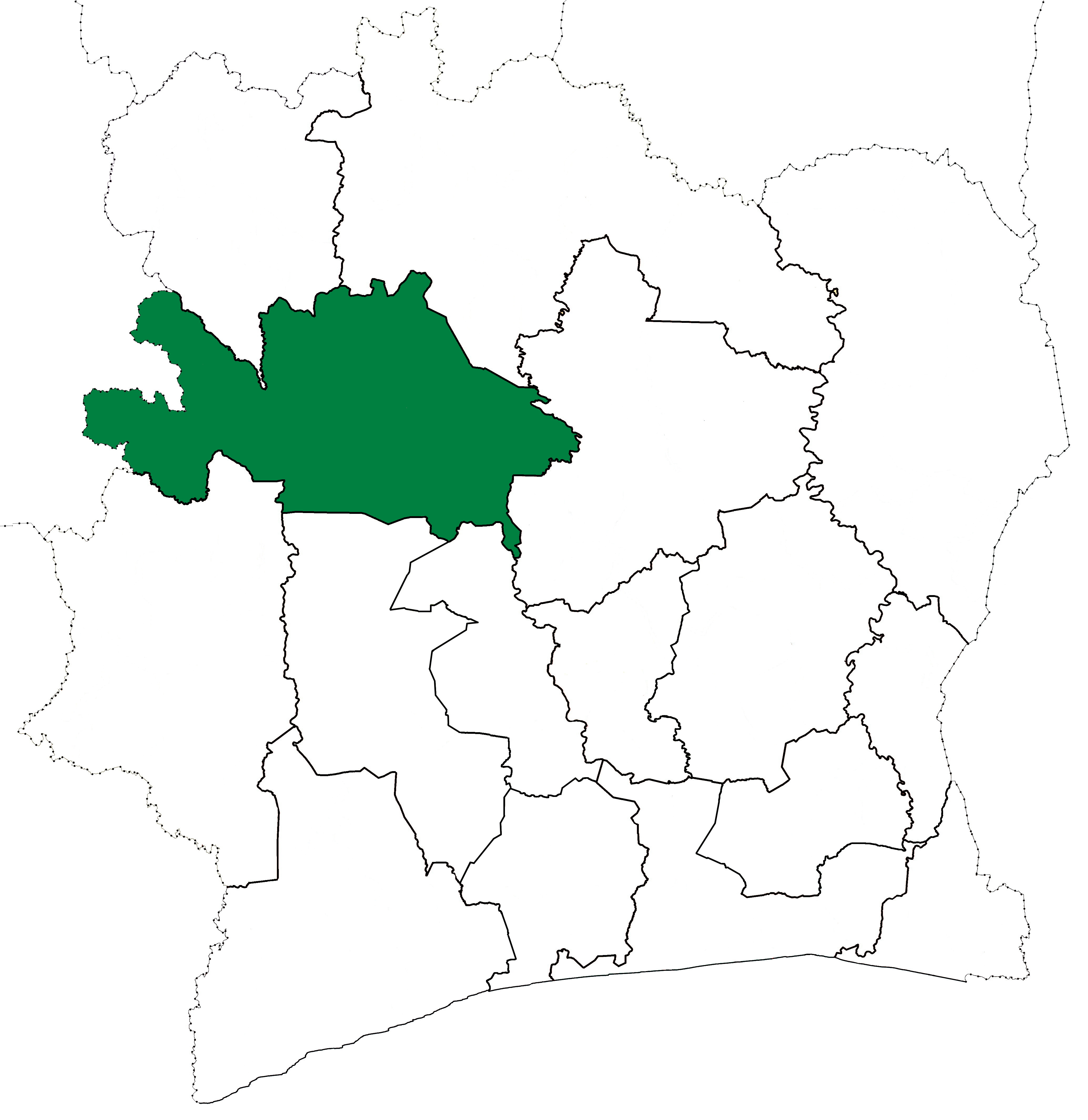
Worodougou Region upon its creation in 1997. Worodougou retained these boundaries until 2000, when it was divided to create Bafing Region.

Worodougou Region was established in 1997 as a first-level administrative subdivision. At its establishment, it included all of the territory that is today Woroba District. In 2000, Bafing Region was created by dividing Worodougou.

Worodougou retained its new boundaries until the 2011 reorganisation of the subdivisions of Ivory Coast, when it was divided a second time, the latter to create Béré Region. As part of the reorganisation, Worodougou was converted into a second-level subdivision and with Bafing and Béré became part of the first-level Woroba District.

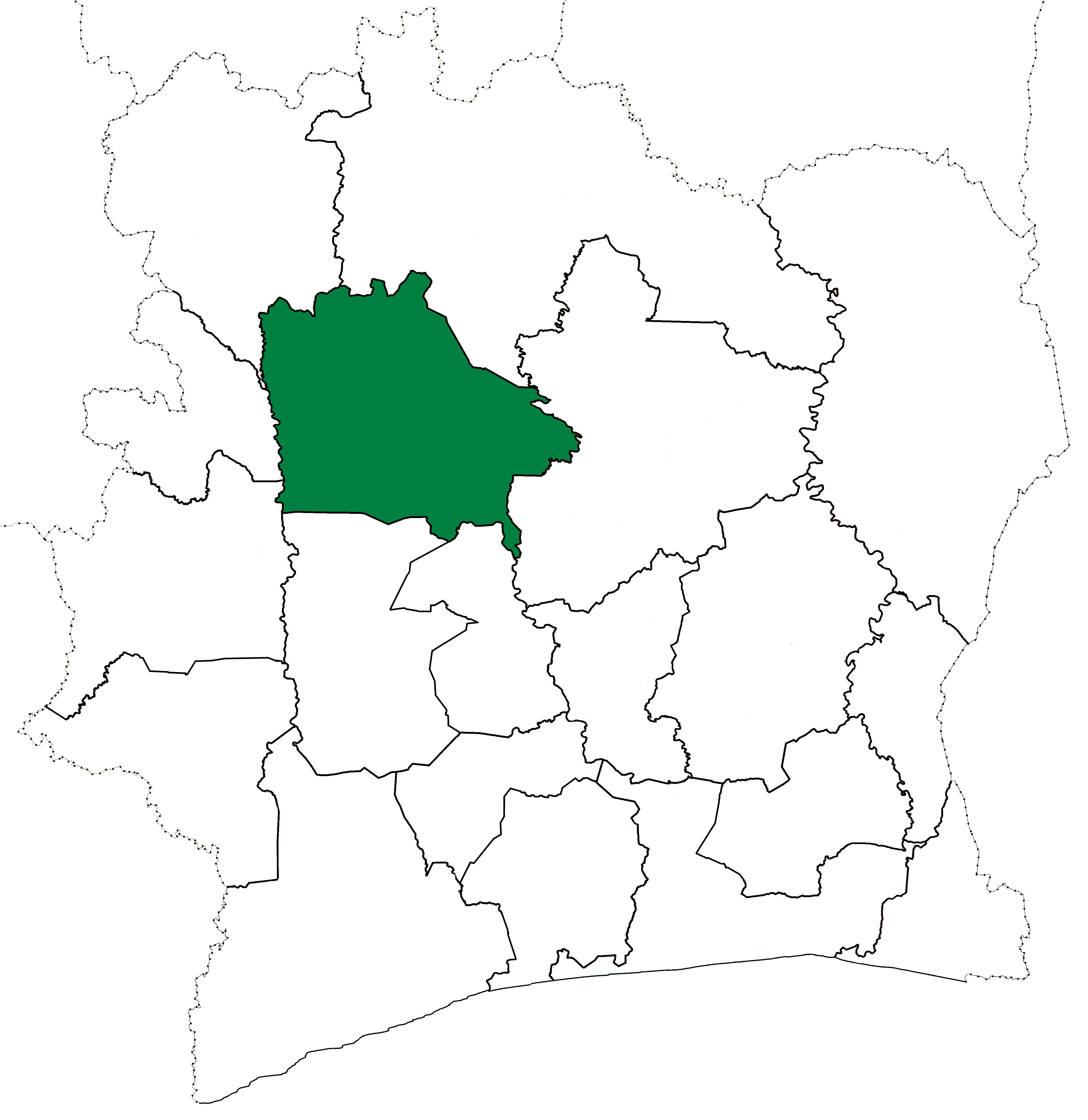
Worodougou Region in 2000, after it had been divided to create Bafing Region. Worodougou retained these boundaries until 2011, when it was divided a second time to create Béré Region.
