= Béré Region =

Coordinates: 8°3′N 6°11′W

Béré Region Région du Béré Koyadougou Region Région du Koyadougou
- Region
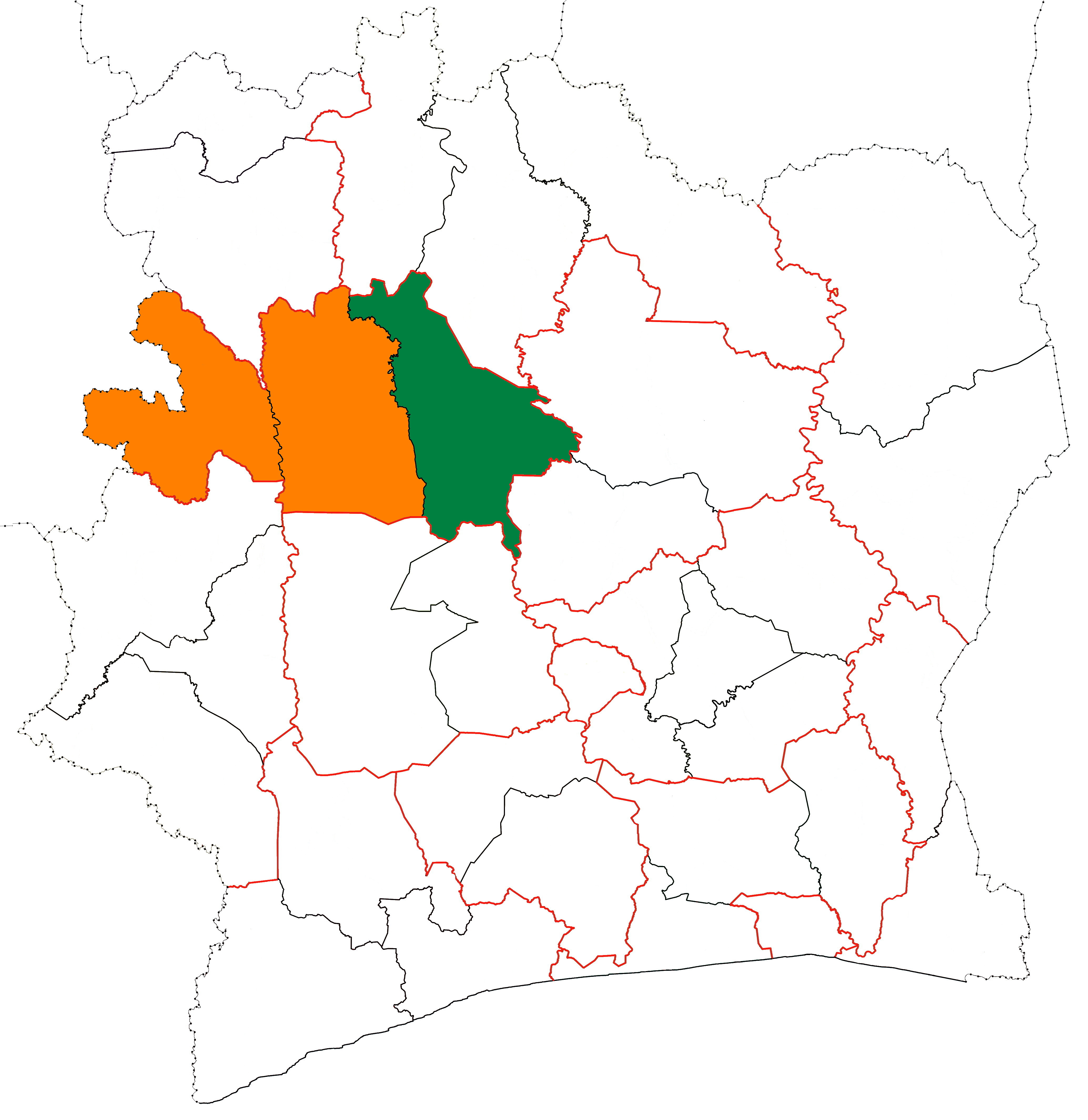
- Location of Béré Region (green) in Ivory Coast and in Woroba District
- Country: Ivory Coast
- District: Woroba
- Established: 2011
- Regional seat: Mankono

Government
  - Prefect: Dago Rémi Adjé
  - Council President: Karamoko Abdel Kader

Area
  - Total: 10,900 km^{2} (4,200 sq mi)

Population (2021 census)
  - Total: 492,151
  - Density: 45.2/km^{2} (117/sq mi)
- Time zone: UTC+0 (GMT)

Béré Region (originally known as Koyadougou Region) is one of the 31 regions of Ivory Coast. Since its establishment in 2011, it has been one of three regions in Woroba District. The seat of the region is Mankono and the region's population in the 2021 census was 492,151.

Béré is currently divided into three departments: Dianra, Kounahiri, and Mankono.

== Name ==
In the 2011 decree that created the region, Béré was referred to exclusively as the region of "Koyadougou". Since its creation, the region has more commonly been referred to as "Béré".
