= List of districts of the Bangka Belitung Islands =

The province of the Bangka–Belitung Islands in Indonesia is divided into kabupaten or regencies which in turn are divided administratively into districts, known as kecamatan.

The districts of the Bangka–Belitung Islands with the regency it falls into are as follows:

- Air Gegas, South Bangka
- Badau, Belitung
- Bakam, Bangka
- Batu Betumpang, South Bangka
- Belinyu, Bangka
- Bukit Intan, Pangkal Pinang
- Dendang, East Belitung
- Gantung, East Belitung
- Gerunggang, Pangkal Pinang
- Jebus, West Bangka
- Kelapa Kampit, East Belitung
- Kelapa, West Bangka
- Koba, Central Bangka
- Lepar Pongok, South Bangka
- Lubuk, Central Bangka
- Manggar, East Belitung
- Membalong, Belitung
- Mendo Barat, Bangka
- Mentok, West Bangka
- Merawang, Bangka
- Namang, Central Bangka
- Pangkal Balam, Pangkal Pinang
- Pangkalan Baru, Central Bangka
- Payung, South Bangka
- Pemali, Bangka
- Puding Besar, Bangka
- Rangkui, Pangkal Pinang
- Riau Silip, Bangka
- Selat Nasik, Belitung
- Sijuk, Belitung
- Simpang Katis, Central Bangka
- Simpang Rimba, South Bangka
- Simpang Teritip, West Bangka
- Sungai Liat, Bangka
- Sungai Selan, Central Bangka
- Taman Sari, Pangkal Pinang
- Tanjung Pandan, Belitung
- Tempilang, West Bangka
- Toboali, South Bangka
- Tukak Sadai, South Bangka
