= List of regencies and cities in the Bangka Belitung Islands =

This is a list of regencies and city in the Bangka Belitung Islands province. As of October 2019, there were 6 regencies and 1 city.

#	Regency/City	Capital	Regent/Mayor	Area (km^{2})	Population (2019)	District	Kelurahan (urban village)/Desa (village)	Logo	Location map
1	Bangka Regency	Sungai Liat	Mulkan	2,950.68	317,052	8	19/62		
2	Bangka Barat Regency	Muntok	Markus	2,820.61	197,066	6	4/60		
3	Bangka Selatan Regency	Toboali	Justiar Noer	3,607.08	176,658	8	3/50		
4	Bangka Tengah Regency	Koba	Yulianto Satin	2,155.77	182,286	6	7/56		
5	Belitung Regency	Tanjung Pandan	Sahani Saleh	2,293.61	169,053	5	7/42		
6	Belitung Timur Regency	Manggar	Yuslih Ihza Mahendra	2,506.91	124,079	7	-/39		
7	Pangkal Pinang	-	Maulan Aklil	89.40	213,573	7	42/-		
