= List of people from the Bangka Belitung Islands =

This is a listing of notable people born in, or notable for their association with, Bangka-Belitung Islands, Indonesia.

== A ==
- Dipa Nusantara Aidit, senior leader of the Communist Party of Indonesia (PKI) (Belitung)
- Eko Maulana Ali, governor of Bangka Belitung (West Bangka)

== B ==
- Basuki Tjahaja Purnama, governor of Jakarta (Manggar, East Belitung Regency)

== D ==
- Artika Sari Devi, Puteri Indonesia 2004 (Pangkal Pinang)

== E ==
- Erzaldi Rosman Djohan, governor of Bangka Belitung (Pangkal Pinang)

== M ==
- Yusril Ihza Mahendra, politician, former chairman of Crescent Star Party (PBB) (Manggar, East Belitung Regency)

== T ==
- Tjung Tin Jan, politician, United States of Indonesia Senator (Sungai Selan, Central Bangka Regency)
