= Celagen Island =

Island in Indonesia

Celagen
- Interactive map of Celagen

Geography
- Coordinates: 2°52′26″S 107°0′56″E
- Area: 3.54 km^{2} (1.37 sq mi)

Administration
- Indonesia
- Province: Bangka Belitung Islands
- Regency: South Bangka
- District: Pongok Islands
- Village: Celagen

Demographics
- Population: 1,311 (2016)
- Pop. density: 370.3/km^{2} (959.1/sq mi)

Celagen is a small island in Bangka-Belitung Province of Indonesia, which consists of one of the two administrative villages of the Pongok Islands District in South Bangka Regency. It is located just around 200 meters west of the larger, more populated island of Pongok and is just separated from the main settlement at Pongok by a small strait. It is located 2 hours from mainland Bangka. With an area of just 354 hectares (~4% of the district), it is inhabited by 1,311 people, one-fifth of the district population, living in 358 households.

As with Pongok, the island was formerly part of the Lepar Pongok District with the larger Lepar Island until that district was divided in 2012. In 2016 and 2017, diesel generators capable of generating 150 and 300 kilowatts were installed in the island by PLN, giving the islanders access to 24 hours of electricity.

Transport between Celagen and Pongok is commonly served by motorboats, which charge a small fee. The inhabitants mostly work as fishermen. Bugis people comprise about 90 percent of the inhabitants.
