= Tukak Sadai =

- District
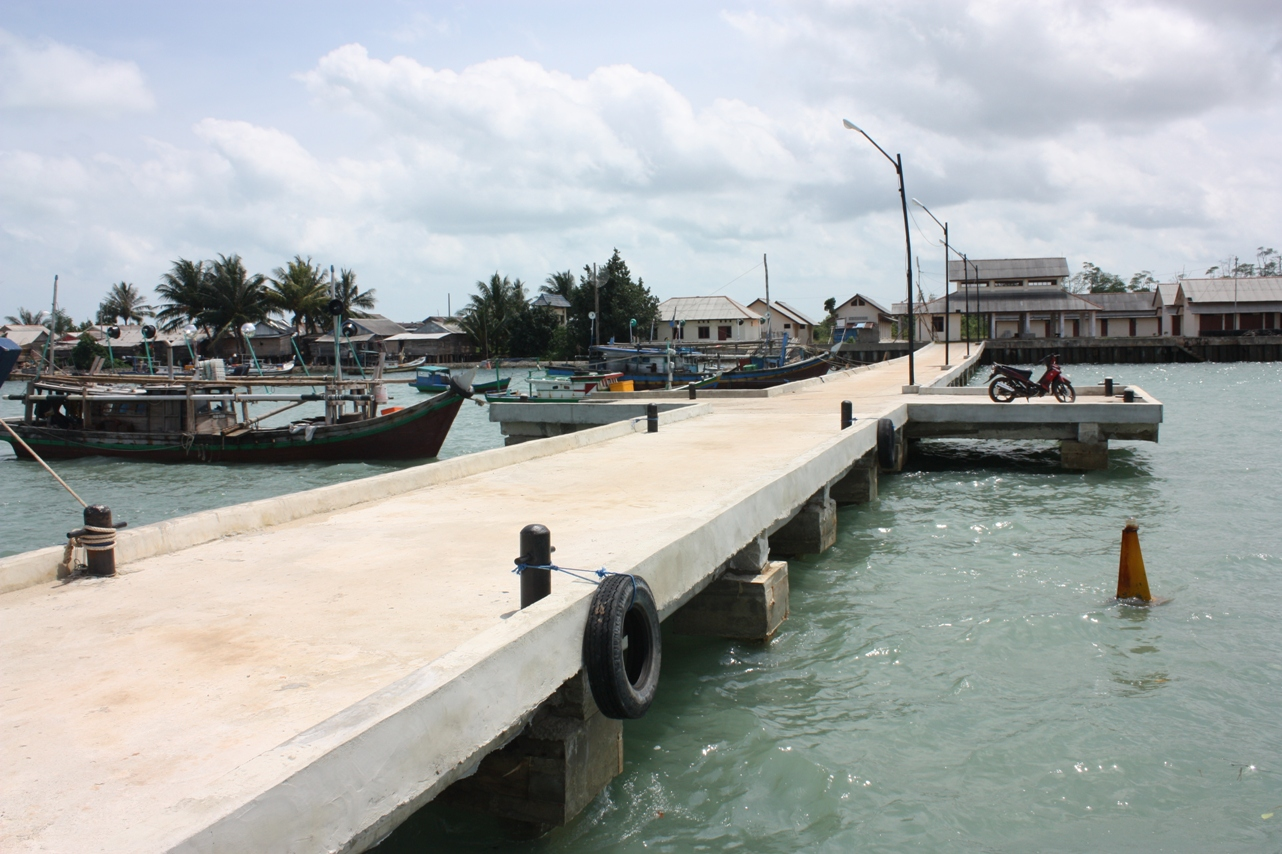
- A fish landing pier in Sadai

- Location of Tukak Sadai in Bangka-Belitung
- Coordinates: 3°1′S 106°38′E
- Country: Indonesia
- Province: Bangka Belitung Islands
- Regency: South Bangka Regency
- Established: 14 December 2007

Area
  - Total: 126 km^{2} (49 sq mi)

Population (2020)
  - Total: 13,941
  - Density: 111/km^{2} (287/sq mi)
- Time zone: UTC+7 (Western Indonesia Time)
- Area code: +62718

Tukak Sadai is a district of South Bangka Regency, Bangka-Belitung Islands. The district is located in the southeastern section of Bangka Island, and contains the Sadai seaport.

== History ==
Tukak Sadai was established on 14 December 2007, after being split off from the southeastern part of Toboali district.

== Administration ==
The district is subdivided into five villages: Tukak, Sadai, Tiram, Pasir Putih and Bukit Terap. The administrative center located in the village of Tiram.

== Economy ==
Most of the workforce in the district, totalling 4,176 people, is recorded as being employed in agriculture (2,166) or fishing (1,224). There are six kindergartens, five elementary schools, two junior high schools, and one trade school in the district. There are 86.65 km of roads in the district, of which 39.3 km were paved.

The Government of Indonesia has planned to develop an industrial zone in the district, to be named the Sadai Industrial Zone, with a planned investment of Rp 58 trillion (USD 4 billion). By July 2020, two Chinese companies - glass manufacturer Xinyi Solar and Sinomach - have signed agreements to construct factories in Sadai. The Port of Sadai, serving passengers crossing to Belitung, is located within the district.
