= Pongok Island =

Island of Indonesia

Pongok
Native name: Pulau Pongok Pulau Liat Pulo Leat
- Location of Pongok in Bangka-Belitung

Geography
- Coordinates: 2°52′39″S 107°1′35″E
- Area: 48.35 km^{2} (18.67 sq mi)
- Highest elevation: 125 m (410 ft)

Administration
- Indonesia
- Province: Bangka Belitung Islands
- Regency: South Bangka
- District: Pongok Islands
- Village: Pongok

Demographics
- Population: 4,234 (2025)
- Pop. density: 98.6/km^{2} (255.4/sq mi)

Pongok (Indonesian: Pulau Pongok; pronounced [ˌpulau̯ ˈpɔŋɔʔ]), also known as Liat, is an Indonesian island which is part of the Pongok Islands District of the South Bangka Regency, Bangka Belitung Province. It comprises over 95% of the district's area and most of its population, with an area of 48.3 square km. It is the 5th largest island in the province, being far smaller than Bangka and Belitung and even smaller than the islands of Lepar and Mendanau.

The smaller island of Celagen, off the western coast of Pongok island, holds the remaining population of the district. Before its division in 2012, both Pongok and Celagen islands were part of the Lepar Pongok District.

== Geography ==
The island is located approximately halfway between Bangka and Belitung, in the middle of the Gaspar Strait, resulting in it sometimes being referred to as "Middle Island". The island stretches approximately 10 km north–south and 8.5 km east–west. Several small streams flow in the island. The terrain is largely flat with little prominent elevations, the highest point on the island being only 125 m above sea level. The island is accessible by boat, with a three-hour journey from mainland Bangka.

== Demographics ==
The island, as Pongok Village, has a population of 5,377 with a sex ratio of 1.14 and divided into 916 households (5.8 persons per household).

== Economy and administration ==
The island is part of the Pongok Village (desa) in the district (Celagen village, on the island of that name, comprises the other desa of the district), and is further subdivided into 7 hamlets (dusun). A solar power plant with a peak capacity of 125 kilowatts was established on the island in 2015.

A stark majority of the labor force are engaged in fisheries and agriculture, with a fish production of about 6,850 tonnes throughout 2016. Several public-funded schools are present on the island, ranging from kindergarten (TK) to senior high school (SMA).
