= Badau district =

Badau district may refer to:

- Badau, West Kalimantan, a district (kecamatan) in Kapuas Hulu Regency, West Kalimantan, Indonesia
- Badau, Bangka Belitung Islands, a district in Belitung Regency, Bangka Belitung Islands, Indonesia
