= Basuri Tjahaja Purnama =

Indonesian politician, former regent of East Belitung

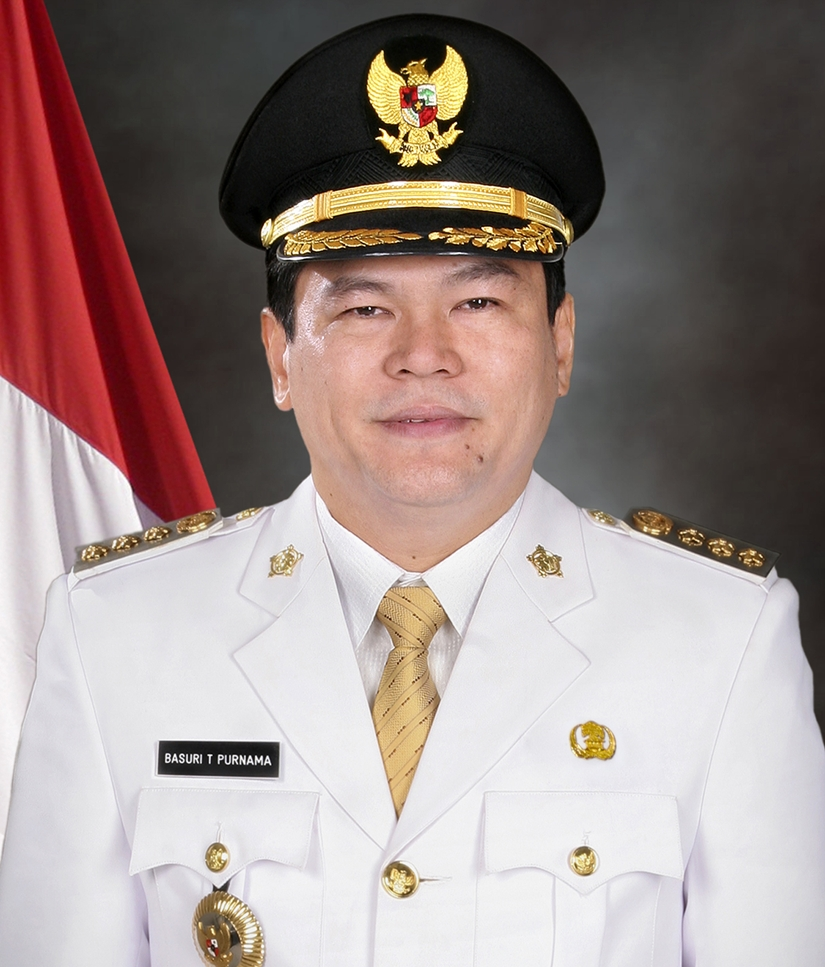
- Official portrait, 2010

3rd Regent of East Belitung
- In office 6 September 2010 – 8 September 2015
- Deputy: Zarkani
- Preceded by: Khairul Efendi
- Succeeded by: Yuslih Ihza Mahendra

Personal details
- Born: 1 December 1968 (age 57) Tanjungpandan, Indonesia
- Relatives: Basuki Tjahaja Purnama (brother)
- Education: Atma Jaya University; University of Indonesia
- Occupation: Politician; Physician

Basuri Tjahaja Purnama (simplified Chinese: 钟万有; traditional Chinese: 鍾萬有; pinyin: Zhōng Wànyǒu; Pe̍h-ōe-jī: Tjoeng Wan Joe, born 1 December 1968) is an Indonesian politician, who served as Regent of East Belitung from 2010 to 2015. He is the younger brother of Basuki Tjahaja Purnama.

== Political career ==
Purnama was elected as regent in the 2010 East Belitung regent election. He was defeated in the 2015 election by Yuslih Ihza Mahendra of the Crescent Star Party.

== Business career ==
In 2018, Purnama was appointed as director at Jababeka Group.
