= Basuki Tjahaja Purnama =

Indonesian politician (born 1966)

- 鐘萬學
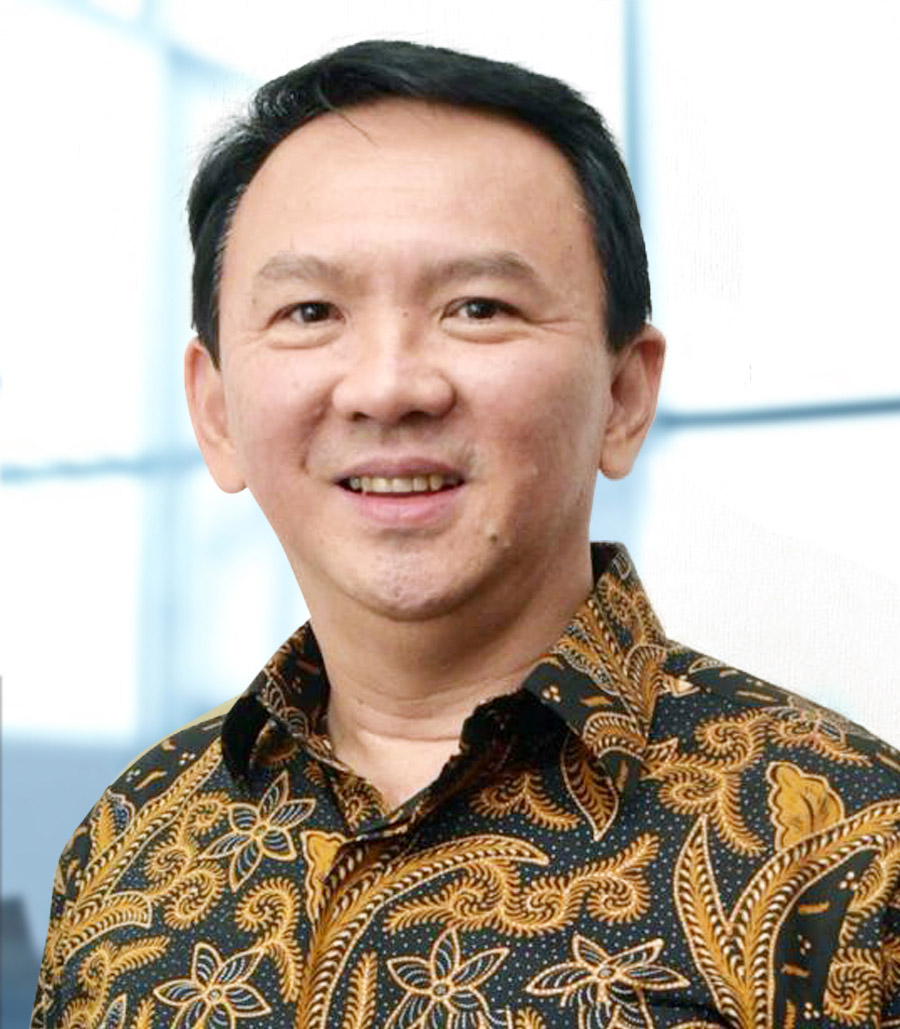
- Ahok in 2020

President Commissioner of Pertamina
- In office 25 November 2019 – 2 February 2024
- Deputy: Pahala Mansury
- Preceded by: Tanri Abeng
- Succeeded by: Simon Aloysius Mantiri

12th Governor of Jakarta
- In office 19 November 2014 – 9 May 2017 (Note: Acting: 1 June – 22 July 2014 and 16 October – 19 November 2014)
- Vice Governor: Djarot Saiful Hidayat
- Preceded by: Joko Widodo
- Succeeded by: Djarot Saiful Hidayat

12th Vice Governor of Jakarta
- In office 15 October 2012 – 16 October 2014
- Governor: Joko Widodo
- Preceded by: Prijanto
- Succeeded by: Djarot Saiful Hidayat

3rd Regent of East Belitung
- In office 3 August 2005 – 22 December 2006
- Deputy: Khairul Effendi
- Preceded by: Usman Saleh (interim)
- Succeeded by: AMB Suwargo (acting); Khairul Effendi

Member of House of Representatives
- In office 1 October 2009 – 26 April 2012
- Succeeded by: Azhar Romli
- Parliamentary group: Golkar
- Constituency: Bangka Belitung

Personal details
- Born: Tjoeng Wan Hok; 29 June 1966 (age 60) Manggar, Indonesia
- Party: PDI-P (since 2019)
- Other political affiliations: PPIB (2004–2008); Golkar (2008–2012); Gerindra (2012–2014); Independent (2014–2019)
- Spouses: Veronica Tan (m. 1997; div. 2018); Puput Nastiti Devi (m. 2019)
- Children: 6 children
- Parents: Indra Tjahaja Purnama (father); Buniarti Ningsih (mother)
- Relatives: Basuri Tjahaja Purnama (brother)
- Education: Trisakti University; Prasetiya Mulya University
- Occupation: Politician; businessperson
- Website: ahok.org
- Nicknames: Ahok; BTP

Basuki Tjahaja Purnama (simplified Chinese: 钟万学; traditional Chinese: 鐘萬學; pinyin: Zhōng Wànxué, Pha̍k-fa-sṳ: Chûng Van-ho̍k; born 29 June 1966) is an Indonesian businessman and former politician who served as the former governor of Jakarta. He is colloquially known by his Hakka Chinese name, Ahok (Chinese: 阿學). He was the first ethnic Chinese governor of Jakarta and the first non-Austronesian governor of Jakarta and also of the Protestant faith, following Henk Ngantung, who was the sole Catholic and Austronesian Minahasan governor to hold office from 1964–65.

Ahok was a legislator in the Indonesian People's Representative Council (DPR) and Regent of East Belitung. He was elected to the House of Representatives for the 2009–2014 term but resigned in 2012 to run for the deputy governorship of Jakarta, to which he was elected. In November 2014, he became governor of Jakarta, as his predecessor Joko Widodo had become president. Ahead of the 2017 Jakarta gubernatorial election, Ahok's political rivals aligned themselves with Islamic extremists to exploit religious and racial intolerance, resulting in Ahok being accused of blasphemy in October 2016. He then lost the election to former Minister of Education and Culture Anies Baswedan and was imprisoned for blasphemy.

== Early life ==
=== Family and personal life ===
Basuki Tjahaja Purnama was born to ethnic Chinese parents of Hakka descent on 29 June 1966 and grew up in Manggar, East Belitung. He is the first son of Buniarti Ningsih and the late Indra Tjahaja Purnama. He has three siblings: Basuri Tjahaja Purnama, Fifi Lety, and Harry Basuki.

Ahok firstly married Veronica Tan, a fellow ethnic Chinese of Teochew ancestry who hailed from Medan on 6 September 1997 and the couple had three children: Nicolas Sean, Nathania and Daud Albeneer. They divorced in 2018, with Ahok gaining custody of the two younger children. Their first child, Nicholas Sean, was of age and thus entitled to determine his own custody status. In 2019, Ahok married Puput Nastiti Devi, a police officer who had previously served as an aide of his ex-wife, and the couple have three children: Yosafat Abimanyu, Sarah Eliana, and Regina Welasih.

=== Education ===
Ahok attended Trisakti University, majoring in mineral resources and technology. He graduated with a bachelor of science degree in geological engineering in 1989 and returned to his hometown in Belitung to build a company that dealt in mining contracts.

After two years of working in the company, he decided to pursue a master's degree in financial management at Prasetiya Mulya Business School in Jakarta. He graduated with a Master of Business Administration.

== Political career ==
=== Early involvement with politics ===
Ahok entered politics in his home region of Belitung. He contested the 2005 East Belitung regent election with Khairul Effendi as his running mate and was elected with 37.13% of the vote. He was hopeful Indonesia was breaking with its long and often violent history of prejudice and resentment. He is nicknamed "The Father" and "The Law" for his firm stance against corruption. Ahok confronted vital issues related to traffic congestion, labour, corruption and bureaucracy. He mediated a minimum wage increase, proposed incentives for street vendors to move to designated markets in order to reduce congestion, migrated poor villagers to new flats, introduced surprise inspections of government offices, and proposed installing CCTVs to improve accountability.

=== 2007 Bangka-Belitung governor election ===
Ahok resigned from his position as East Belitung regent on 11 December 2006 in order to run in the 2007 Bangka-Belitung gubernatorial election. He later credited former Indonesian president Abdurrahman Wahid, for convincing him to run for public office. Wahid supported Ahok's candidacy and praised his healthcare reforms. However, Ahok was defeated by Eko Maulana Ali.

In 2008, Ahok wrote a biography titled Merubah Indonesia (Reforming Indonesia).

=== Parliamentary career (2009–2012) ===
In 2009, Ahok was elected to the DPR as a member of Golkar. He was elected with 119,232 votes, and was assigned to the Second Commission. In 2011, he generated controversy in a visit to his local constituency, during which he was recorded by the local media condemning local tin mining businesses for causing environmental damage. The comment was regarded as an insult by a local youth NGO, who reported him to the House Ethics Committee.

=== Jakarta's deputy governor (2012–2014) ===
In 2011, Ahok considered running for Jakarta governor as an independent candidate. However, he opted not to run, as he was pessimistic about his chances of receiving 250,000 signatures, a requirement for running as an independent gubernatorial candidate in Jakarta. He then became the running mate of Joko Widodo in the 2012 election. The pair won 1,847,157 (42.6%) votes in the first round, and 2,472,130 (53.82%) in the second round, defeating incumbent governor Fauzi Bowo. The ticket was nominated by the Indonesian Democratic Party of Struggle (PDI-P) and the Great Indonesia Movement Party (Gerindra). On 10 September 2014, Ahok left Gerindra because he opposed the party's proposal to scrap direct elections for local leaders.

=== Governorship (2014–2017) ===
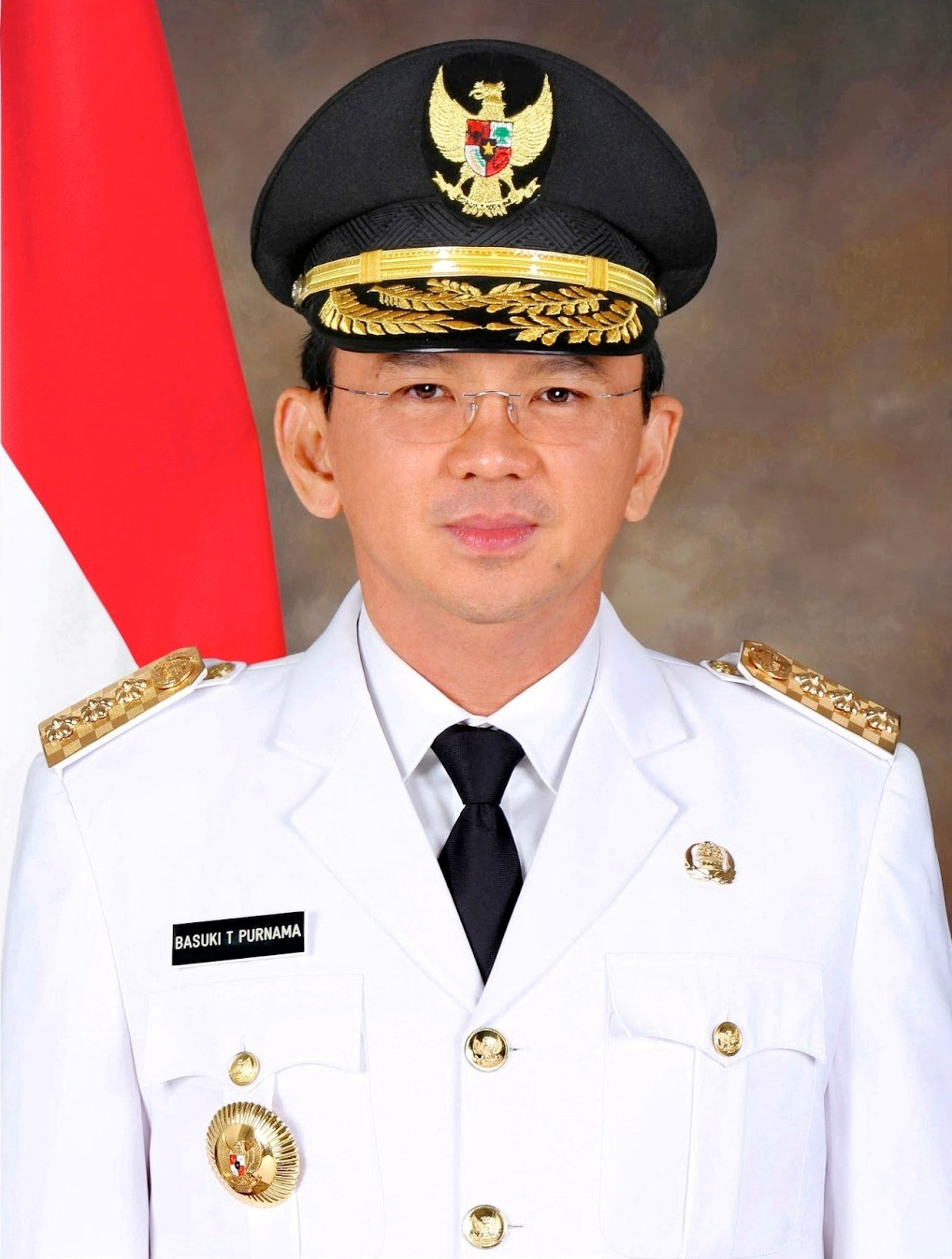
Ahok's official portrait as Governor of Jakarta

When Joko Widodo took a temporary leave from his post as Jakarta governor to campaign for the presidency, Ahok became acting Governor of Jakarta from 1 June to 22 July 2014. Following Jokowi's victory, he succeeded him as governor and was sworn into office on 18 November 2014.

One of the most notable acts of his governorship was the creation of the Public Facility Maintenance Agency (Indonesian: Penanganan Prasarana dan Sarana Umum; PPSU) on 13 May 2015, which established cleaning and maintenance crews at the kelurahan level. It has been cited as one of his most successful programs, and received widespread approval from residents. The program would be continued by his successors, and was even praised by his competitor during campaigning in the 2017 election.

In October 2015, the State Audit Board (BPK) commenced an investigation into the city's procurement of 3.7 hectares of land adjacent to Sumber Waras Hospital in West Jakarta for a cardiac and cancer center. The city administration bought the land in 2014 for Rp775.69 billion, but BPK subsequently said the land should have cost Rp564.35 billion, so the purchase had caused a state loss of Rp191 billion. The Corruption Eradication Commission questioned Ahok over the case in 2016 and cleared him of any wrongdoing. Anti-corruption activist Boyamin Saiman claimed he had evidence of corruption and demanded Ahok be held accountable. Corruption allegations were also made over an allegedly fallacious land purchase made by the city administration in Cengkareng, West Jakarta, on 13 November 2015, with a marked-up price causing an estimated state loss of Rp600 billion. In December 2020, South Jakarta District Court heard a pre-trial hearing over the Cengkareng land procurement case.

=== 2017 reelection bid ===
Ahok initially had declared to run for the 2017 Jakarta gubernatorial election as an independent candidate with Teman Ahok (Friends of Ahok), a group of volunteers responsible for collecting over one million Resident Identity Cards, representing supporters required by Indonesian law to be eligible to run on an independent ticket. Due to a new state regulation that tightened the requirements for independent candidates, Ahok ran on the party tickets of three political parties, who previously endorsed him earlier in 2016. They were Golkar, the People's Conscience Party (Hanura), and the NasDem Party. On 20 September 2016, the PDI-P declared its support for Ahok.

In the first round of voting on 15 February 2017, Ahok entered into the second-round between two candidates, having secured approximately 43% of the vote, ahead of Anies Baswedan with 40%, and well ahead of Agus Yudhoyono with 17%. Quick counts for the 19 April runoff indicated that Anies Baswedan was elected as governor; Ahok conceded defeat hours after the polls closed. The official results of the runoff were published by General Elections Commissions (KPU) in May, and Anies Baswedan was elected as the new governor of Jakarta.

==== Target of racism ====
As a member of a minority ethnic group, Ahok has become the subject of occasional racist comments. During the campaign, he was regularly targeted by ultra-conservatives and supporters of rival candidates for being of Chinese descent. Furthermore, his "double minority" background, being both Christian and of Chinese descent, has made him the target of the hardline Islamic Defenders Front (Front Pembela Islam, FPI). The group called for a revision of a Jakarta constitution to remove some of the governor's responsibilities for government-affiliated Islamic organisations. In 2016, Indonesian Army General Suryo Prabowo commented that Ahok should "know his place lest the Indonesian Chinese face the consequences of his action". This controversial comment was considered to hearken back to previous violence against Chinese Indonesians.

==== Blasphemy allegations and imprisonment ====
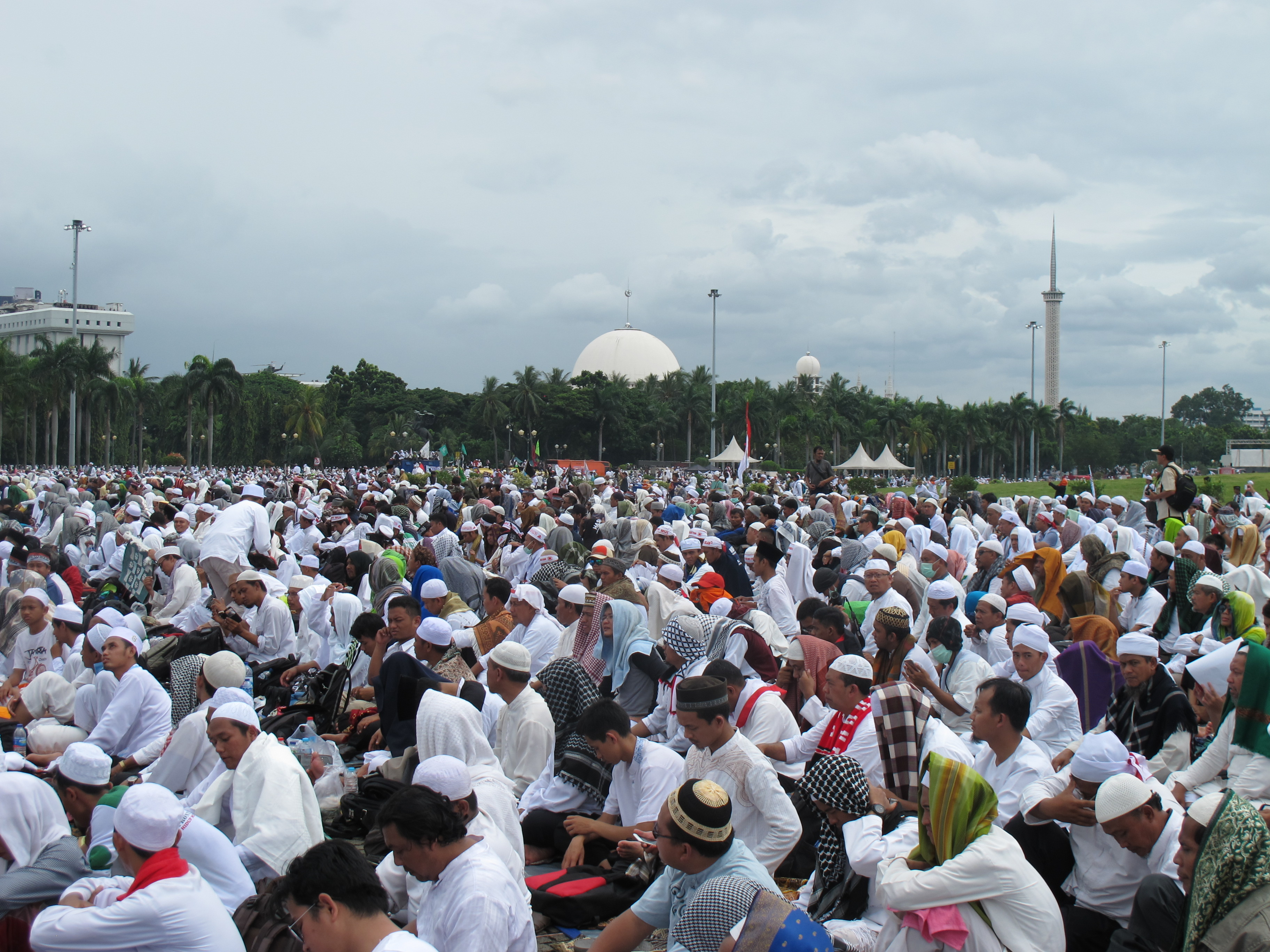
Islamist protests against Ahok in Jakarta, 2 December 2016

On 27 September 2016, while introducing a government project to citizens of the Thousand Islands, Ahok said some citizens would not vote for him because they were being "threatened and deceived" by those using the verse Al-Ma'ida 51 of the Qur'an and variations of it. (Note: The verse says, in the Abdullah Yusuf Ali translation, "O ye who believe! Take not the Jews and the Christians for your friends and protectors. They are but friends and protectors to each other. And he amongst you that turns to them is of them. Verily, Allah guideth not a people unjust.") The provincial government of Jakarta uploaded the video recording to YouTube in a channel which often featured Ahok's activities. The video was later edited by Buni Yani, a university lecturer, who omitted the word 'using' (pakai) from the transcript. This omission led to a misinterpretation of Basuki's statement, making it appear as though he was labeling the verse itself as deceitful. The video went viral, with some citizens considering it an insult to the Quran. Ahok received threats of lynching and was widely criticised in social media such as Facebook and Twitter. Several Change.org petitions were filed, initiated by both his supporters and critics, garnering tens of thousands of signatures.

Some groups, such as the FPI, or the local chapter of the Indonesian Ulema Council, reported Ahok to the police, accusing him of having violated Indonesia's blasphemy law. On 10 October 2016, Ahok publicly apologised to those he offended with his statement, stating that it was not his intention to do so and that some of his policies had benefited Muslims, such as granting permits for Islamic schools, providing Jakarta Smart Cards (KJP) to the students, and building a mosque in the City Hall complex. He also pointed out that during his Thousand Islands speech, the residents were not insulted, and even amused during his recitation.

On 9 May 2017, Ahok was sentenced to two years in prison by North Jakarta District Court after being found guilty of blasphemy and inciting violence. The panel of judges rejected his defence that he referred to a Quranic verse to highlight political discrimination. Based on the court hearing, the panel of judges said that his Thousand Islands speech contained elements of blasphemy. The chief judge maintained that Ahok's statement considered the Al-Maidah verse as a tool to deceive or a source of lies. He said the verse is part of the Quran, and that anyone who quotes it should not have any intent of deception. The judges took into consideration a book Ahok had written in 2008 titled Changing Indonesia. His book was judged as proof that he understood the verse in question. They determined the word aulia ("friends and protectors", or "allies") in the verse could be defined as a leader, thus declaring that Ahok's remarks to be degrading and insulting to the Quran. They also agreed with expert witnesses in the trial that Ahok's remarks were a blasphemous offence.

==== Aftermath ====
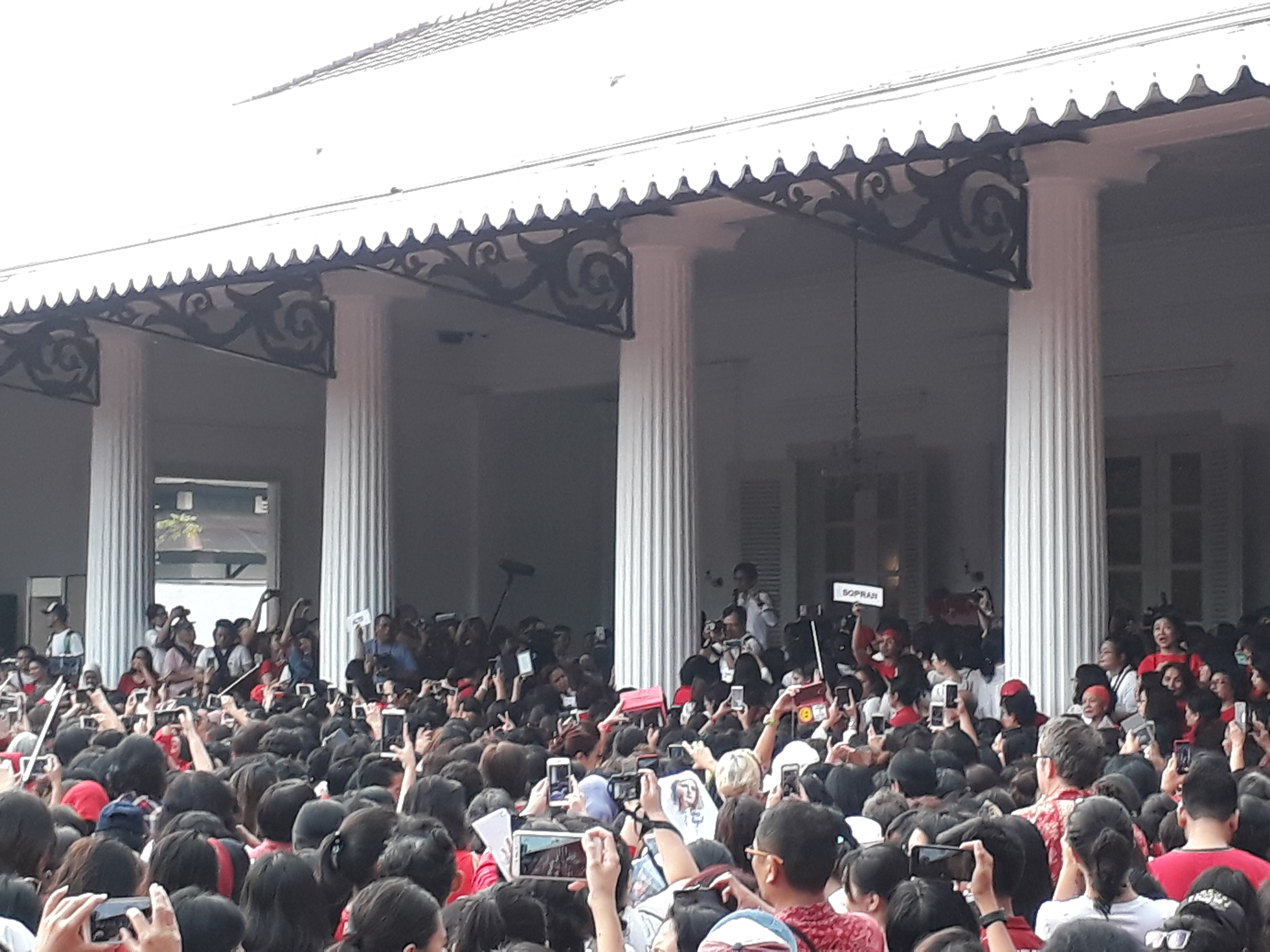
The singing protest for Ahok arranged by Addie MS

The verdict was met with scrutiny, condemnation and heavy criticism by many Indonesians and observers in the international community, in a case widely seen as a test of religious tolerance and free speech. Many said the verdict was politically driven, retaliatory in nature, and the judges had succumbed to pressure from extremist Islamic groups, disgruntled corrupt business groups, and politicians and officials who were previously criticised by the Ahok administration. Several civil society groups protested his imprisonment, including Amnesty International. Renowned music composer and conductor Addie MS conducted a singing protest in front of the Balai Kota (city hall). Candle-lit vigils were held in various cities. Many observers and individuals both inside and outside of Indonesia have also petitioned the Indonesian government to amend the blasphemy law on the basis that it is discriminatory and targets minorities. The promotion of three judges from the panel a few days after the verdict also raised suspicions and spurred criticism from many Indonesians.

As a result of his imprisonment, Ahok was unable to finish his term as governor and was replaced by his deputy, Djarot Saiful Hidayat, who served until the administration completed its term in October 2017. Ahok initially wished to appeal his sentence but withdrew his appeal on 22 May 2017. In an unusual move, the prosecutors filed an appeal against the verdict, arguing the sentence was much heavier than the 1-year imprisonment they had requested. In February 2018, he filed a case review request to the Supreme Court, with his lawyers citing a conviction for tampering with the video footage which was used as evidence against him. On 26 March, the Supreme Court rejected his appeal.

Before his arrest, Ahok had said that one day he wanted to be president of Indonesia. Although parole was possible in August 2018, Ahok stated that he would serve his entire sentence before leaving prison. In 2017, Foreign Policy included Ahok in its list of Global Thinkers 2017 "for standing up to Indonesia's creeping fundamentalism."

=== Post-imprisonment ===
He was released on 24 January 2019 due to remissions granted at Indonesian Independence Day and Christmas. Soon afterwards, he joined the PDI-P. He has requested to be called as 'BTP', rather than 'Ahok' by which he is more well known.

In 2019, Ahok stated that he "could no longer become a government official". During Jokowi's second term of presidency, Ahok was appointed as the president commissioner of the state-owned oil and gas firm Pertamina. By February 2020, the 212 Movement (the same group which protested his alleged blasphemy) had protested for Ahok to be removed from Pertamina.

Ahok has been named as a potential candidate by polling agencies and political observers in the 2024 Jakarta gubernatorial election. Although he would be ineligible to run for President or to be appointed as a government minister due to his sentencing, he is allowed to run as a regional leader provided that a public announcement is given on his prior imprisonment. On 2 February 2024, he resigned from Pertamina in order to campaign for Ganjar Pranowo in Ganjar's 2024 presidential campaign.

== Awards and achievements ==
No	Award from	Award category / Award name	Award Information
1	WWF	National Earth Hour Capital 2015	High commitment to low-carbon development in a number of significant sectors
2	WWF	National Earth Hour Capital 2016	High commitment to low-carbon development in a number of significant sectors
3	PT Telkom Indonesia	Smart City Nusantara	Improving infrastructure connectivity, after informing and collaborating with the community
4	Indonesia Green Award 2016	The Most Inspiring	Increasing Green Open Space (Ruang Terbuka Hijau) in DKI Jakarta
5	Bappenas	Best MDGs	Achievement of the Highest MDGs (Millennium Development Goals) of 2015
6	Bappenas	Best I Provincial Category (2016)	Best planning
7	Bappenas	Best I Provincial Category (2016)	Innovative planning
8	Bappenas	Best I Provincial Category (2016)	Progressive planning
9	Abdurrahman Wahid (Gus Dur) Families	Gus Dur Awards 2016	Brave, assertive anti-corruption in the manner of Gus Dur
10	Bappenas	MDGs	Greatest achievement
11	Bappenas	MDGs	Most inspiring achievement
12	Bappenas and LKPP	National Procurement Awards	Success and leadership in transforming electronic procurement
13	Komisi Pemberantasan Korupsi	Anti Gratuity Awards	Success in controlling gratuities within Jakarta Provincial Government
14	Basarnas	Honorary Citizens of Basarnas	Recognition and reward from National SAR Agencies (Basarnas)
15	Alzheimers Disease International	Champion Alzheimer's Disease	Support and improvement of activities that raise awareness of Alzheimer's disease, dementia and the need of special care for the elderly
16	Bung Hatta Anti Corruption Awards	Anti Corruption Figures	Integrity and innovation in campaigns to achieve budget transparency
17	Democracy Awards	Democracy Awards	Success as the head of a region in strengthening regional autonomy within the framework of the Unitary Republic of Indonesia (NKRI)
18	Serikat Perusahaan Pers	SPS Political Figures	Awarded at the Indonesia Public Relations Awards & Summit
19	MNC Group	Controversial Figures	Awarded at the Anugerah Seputar Indonesia
20	MURI	Achievement in PTSP Service	In one year published more than 4 million licensing services
21	MURI	Preventing Terrorism in Society	Social program of terrorism prevention among the 7,200 peoples in coordination with the National Agency for Counter-Terrorism (BNPT) and Coordination Forum on Terrorism Prevention
22	MURI	Achievement in Robot Assembly	Enabling more than 1,000 West Jakarta kindergarten students in teams to build robots
23	LEPRID	Record Achievement	Recognition award for record-setting flower boards (recorded until 3 May 2017, as many as 5228 flower boards) co-awarded to deputy governor Djarot Saiful Hidayat
24	MURI	Recognition for the Longest Flower Boards Parade	Received for the longest flower boards (boards start at Jakarta City Hall (which is located on the South Medan Merdeka road) and extend to Monas and surrounding areas (including behind the Jakarta Parliament Building), which was certified as a record by MURI)
25	Bappenas	Best II Provincial Category (2017)	Best planning
26	Bappenas	Best I Provincial Category (2017)	Best innovation in planning
27	Foreign Policy	Global Thinkers 2017	For opposing Indonesian fundamentalism
28	Roosseno Award IX – 2019	Work Ethic, High Integrity and Creative Ideas for the Public	Recognition as an Indonesian with a strong work ethic and great integrity whose creativity in public development has continually inspired the Indonesian people

== Criticism ==
=== Evictions of squatters ===
Human rights groups and academics criticized Ahok's forced evictions of Jakarta's urban poor 'kampung' residents from areas zoned for redevelopment to reduce floods and traffic and create green space. Ahok said the residents were illegally squatting on government-owned land and would be moved to newly built public housing. Jakarta Legal Aid Foundation noted at least 16,000 urban poor families had been displaced in two years during his administration. There were 193 forced evictions alone in 2016, compared to 113 in 2015. Human rights groups said the evictions were not conducted under the United Nations Economic and Social Council (ECOSOC) convention, which Indonesia ratified in 2005. One of the conditions of the covenant requires a dialogue before eviction and compensation for any damaged property. Ahok was criticized for deploying police and military personnel during evictions that were part of shutting down and redeveloping a brothel complex.

Ahok said his policies only evicted illegal squatters in order to uphold the rule of law. Human rights groups argued that under Indonesian land policy, the so-called illegal squatters should have received land certificates for having lived there for more than 30 years. Ahok relocated the evicted people to privately-funded public housing, but the relocations drew criticism for not meeting basic living standards and having a cost that jumped from the equivalent of about $10 to $20 a month to $70 to $100. Ahok was also accused of employing double standards in the evictions. Rujak Center for Urban Studies researcher Dian Tri Irawaty noted that the evictions did not apply to commercial areas and elite neighbourhoods in Jakarta. She cited the Taman Anggrek mall in West Jakarta, the neighbourhoods and commercial areas in Kelapa Gading and Pluit in North Jakarta, which were also built on water catchment areas. Ian Wilson of Murdoch University argued that Ahok's policies that affected Jakarta's urban poor were overshadowed by his status as an ethnic and religious minority, especially since at the same time he was accused of blasphemy. Many lower and middle-class citizens felt he had ignored public aspirations and caused hundreds of residents to lose their homes.

Ahok countered that he had a different concept of human rights, saying, "I would kill 2,000 people in front of you to save 10 million." The leader of human rights group KontraS, Haris Azhar, said Ahok's anti-corruption image was "nothing but a publicity gimmick" for his lack of awareness in human rights.

== Notes ==
Political offices
Preceded by Joko Widodo	Governor of Jakarta; 2014–2017	Succeeded by Djarot Saiful Hidayat
