= Air Gegas =

- District
- Location of Air Gegas in Bangka-Belitung
- Coordinates: 2°41′S 106°23′E
- Country: Indonesia
- Province: Bangka Belitung Islands
- Regency: South Bangka Regency
- Established: 30 April 2001

Area
  - Total: 853.64 km^{2} (329.59 sq mi)

Population (2020)
  - Total: 46,475
  - Density: 54.443/km^{2} (141.01/sq mi)
- Time zone: UTC+7 (Western Indonesia Time)
- Area code: +62718

Air Gegas is a district of South Bangka Regency, Bangka-Belitung Islands. It is the second largest and second most populated district in the regency after the regency seat of Toboali.

The district is subdivided into ten villages, with the administrative centre being at the village of Air Gegas. There are over 1,100 kolong (holes left over by mining activities) in the district due to tin mining, and reclamation activities have been conducted on 49.8 hectares of such land.

== History ==
Air Gegas was established in 2001, in which at the time was part of Bangka Regency. In 2003, the district became part of newly-established South Bangka Regency.
