= Simpang Rimba =

- District
- Location of Simpang Rimba in Bangka-Belitung
- Coordinates: 2°33′39″S 106°0′7″E
- Country: Indonesia
- Province: Bangka Belitung Islands
- Regency: South Bangka Regency
- Established: 30 April 2001

Area
  - Total: 362.3 km^{2} (139.9 sq mi)

Population (2020)
  - Total: 25,133
  - Density: 69.37/km^{2} (179.7/sq mi)
- Time zone: UTC+7 (Western Indonesia Time)
- Area code: +62718

Simpang Rimba is a district of South Bangka Regency, Bangka-Belitung Islands. It is the fourth largest and third most populated district in the regency, with a population of over 25,000.

== History ==
Simpang Rimba was established in 2001, in which at the time was part of Bangka Regency. In 2003, the district became part of newly-established South Bangka Regency.
