= Payung, South Bangka =

Payung
- District
- Location of Payung in Bangka-Belitung
- Coordinates: 2°36′S 106°8′E
- Country: Indonesia
- Province: Bangka Belitung Islands
- Regency: South Bangka Regency
- Established: 30 April 2001

Area
  - Total: 372.95 km^{2} (144.00 sq mi)

Population (2020)
  - Total: 22,473
  - Density: 60.257/km^{2} (156.07/sq mi)
- Time zone: UTC+7 (Western Indonesia Time)
- Area code: +62718

Payung is a district of South Bangka Regency, Bangka-Belitung Islands. It is located in the northern part of the regency, bordering the Central Bangka Regency.

== History ==
Payung district was established in 2001, in which at the time was part of Bangka Regency. In 2003, the district became part of newly-established South Bangka Regency.

== Administrative divisions ==
The district is subdivided into nine villages. The administrative center is located at Payung village.

Village	Area (km2)	Population
Bedengung	65.321	2,275
Irat	32.438	1,308
Sengir	30.75	1,503
Payung	50.466	4,222
Nadung	17.898	1,407
Ranggung	46.602	3,279
Pangkal Buluh	38.653	2,520
Malik	59.653	1,321
Paku	31.17	2,154

== Economy ==
The economy of the district is largely agricultural, with the labor force nearly entirely engaged in agriculture.
