= Badau, Bangka Belitung Islands =

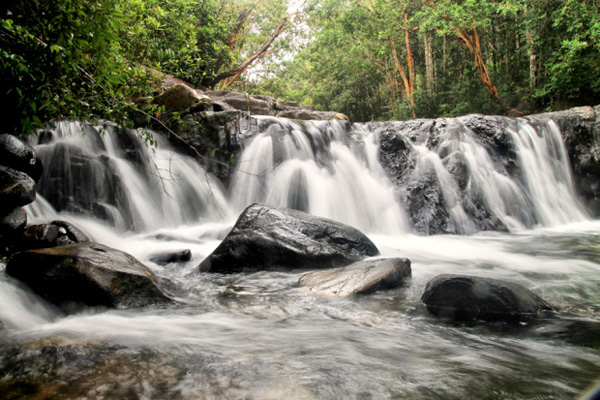
- One of the best nature retreats is Batu Mentas. It is located in Badau District. Actually, it belongs to Kelekak Datuk Village. An Interesting Nature Tourism in Badau District – Batu Mentas

Badau
- District
- Interactive map of Badau
- Country: Indonesia
- Province: Bangka Belitung Islands
- Regency: Belitung Regency

Badau is a district located in Belitung Regency, Bangka Belitung Islands, Indonesia.

== Villages ==
Badau District consists of 6 sub-districts, namely:

1. Pegantungan
2. Sungai Samak
3. Cerucuk
4. Badau
5. Kacang Butor
6. Air Batu Buding
