= Mendanau Island =

Island in Belitung Regency, Bangka Belitung Islands Province, Indonesia

Mendanau
Native name: Pulau Mendanau
- Location of Mendanau in Bangka-Belitung

Geography
- Coordinates: 2°53′52″S 107°24′30″E
- Area: 113 km^{2} (44 sq mi)
- Highest elevation: 179 m (587 ft)

Administration
- Indonesia
- Province: Bangka Belitung Islands
- Regency: Belitung
- District: Selat Nasik

Demographics
- Population: 5,674 (2020)
- Pop. density: 111.2/km^{2} (288/sq mi)

Mendanau is an island in the Bangka Belitung province of Indonesia. Located about 6 km off the west coast of Belitung and 20 km from the town of Tanjung Pandan, it is the fourth largest island in the province after Bangka, Belitung and Lepar with an area of approximately 113 square kilometers. Administratively it forms - with about 27 satellite islands - the Selat Nasik District of Belitung Regency, and it is home to 5,674 people at the 2020 Census, mostly spread in 3 settlements.

== Geography ==
The island is located in the Gaspar Strait, which separates the two large islands of Bangka and Belitung. Being the largest island in its archipelagic district, Mendanau is the second largest island in the strait after Lepar, and is surrounded by a handful of smaller islands, most of which are uninhabited. It borders the Natuna Sea to the north and Java Sea to the south. Due to its small size, the island consists of a long coastline with a forested interior.

Mostly having a flat terrain, the highest elevation of the island reaches about 179 m. The coastline of the whole island is fringed by a fringing reef from the Holocene, measuring about 75 km. The monthly average temperature of the island hovers around 26 C throughout the year, and the local climate is classified as tropical rainforest (Af) in the Köppen climate classification.

The island comprises the majority of the populations and territory of 3 out of 4 villages within the Selat Nasik District: Suak Gual, Petaling and Selat Nasik. The district office is located in the latter.

== History ==
During the Indonesian Revolution, as NICA forces retook Tanjung Pandan, local members of the TKR engaged them in a brief armed clash which killed several in both sides before the pemuda surrendered unconditionally.

== Demographics ==
The island's population, combined with a handful of satellite islets, was 4,232 individuals separated into 1,234 households in 2016. Of this, 2,448 were aged between 15 and 55. Throughout 2016, there was a net migration of 25 persons leaving the district from the island, larger than the net difference between births and deaths which was 14 in the same year.

== Economy ==
As with other islands in the area, agriculture and fisheries dominate the island's economy. In 2016, local fishermen landed 4,601 tonnes of fish. Rubber, pepper and coconut are important cash crops with palm oil plantations beginning to grow within the island.

About 30 kilometers of paved road are present in the island. A single public fish market is present in Selat Nasik village, the only one in the subdistrict. A diesel-powered electricity plant, with a total capacity of 1.2 megawatts, is under construction to provide all-day electricity for the island's inhabitants.
