= South Bangka Regency =

Regency in Bangka Belitung Islands, Indonesia

South Bangka Regency Kabupaten Bangka Selatan
- Regency
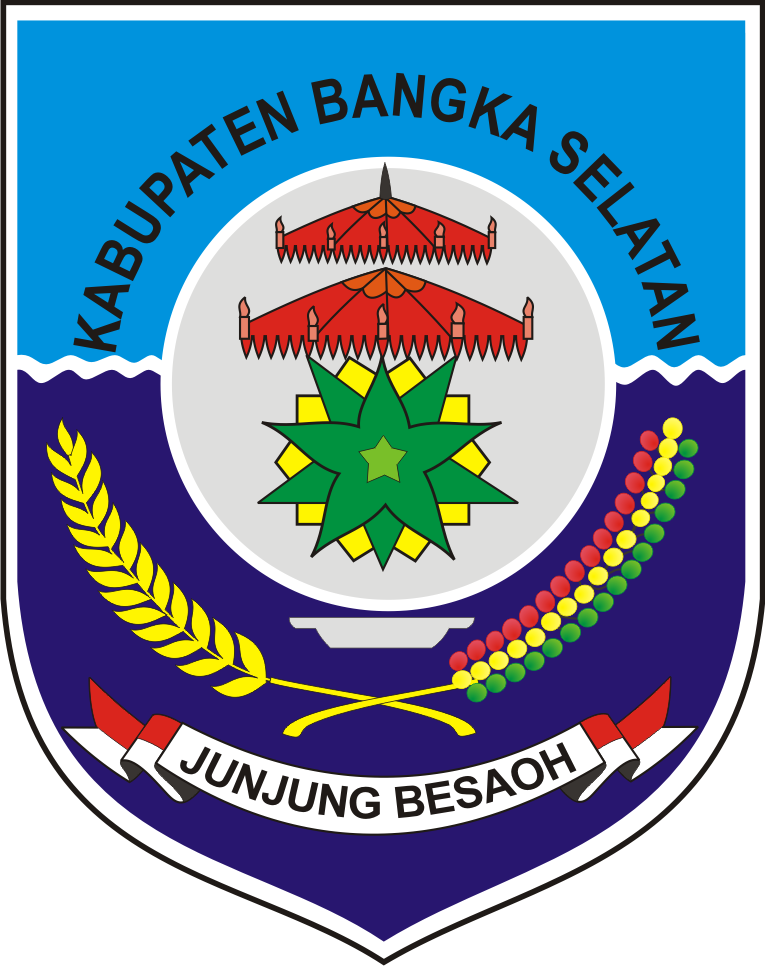
- Coat of arms

- Location within Bangka Belitung Islands

- Location in Sumatra and Indonesia South Bangka Regency (Indonesia)
- Coordinates: 2°46′S 106°20′E
- Country: Indonesia
- Province: Bangka Belitung Islands
- Regency seat: Toboali

Government
  - Regent: Riza Herdavid
  - Vice Regent: Debby Vita Dewi

Area
  - Total: 3,607.08 km^{2} (1,392.70 sq mi)

Population (mid 2025 estimate)
  - Total: 219,904
  - Density: 60.9645/km^{2} (157.897/sq mi)
- Time zone: UTC+7 (IWST)
- Area code: (+62) 718
- Website: bangkaselatankab.go.id

South Bangka Regency (Indonesian: Kabupaten Bangka Selatan) is a regency (kabupaten) of Bangka Belitung Islands Province, Indonesia. It is situated in the southern part of Bangka Island, and was created on 25 February 2003 from what had formerly been the southern districts of Bangka Regency. Its only land border is with Central Bangka Regency to the north. It also includes several small islands off the southeast coast of Bangka Island in the Gaspar Strait, such as Lepar and Pongok. The regency covers a land area of 3,607.08 km^{2} and had a population of 172,476 at the 2010 Census and 198,189 at the 2020 Census; the official estimate as of mid 2025 was 219,904 (comprising 113,527 males and 106,377 females). Its administrative headquarters are in the town of Toboali.

== Administrative districts ==
At the time of the 2010 Census, the Regency was divided into seven districts (kecamatan), but in 2013 an eighth district was added by the splitting of the Lepar Pongok District into separate districts based on Lepar Island and Pongok Island respectively. The districts are tabulated below with their areas and their populations at the 2010 Census and 2020 Census, together with the official estimates as of mid 2025. The table also includes the locations of the district administrative centres, the numbers of administrative villages in each district (totaling 50 rural desa and 3 urban kelurahan), and its postal code.

Kode Wilayah	Name of District (kecamatan)	Area in km^{2}	Pop'n Census 2010	Pop'n Census 2020	Pop'n Estimate mid 2025	Admin centre	No. of villages	Post code
19.03.05	Payung	372.95	18,614	20,907	22,646	Payung	9	33778
19.03.07	Pulau Besar ^{(a)}	169.87	8,181	9,335	10,286	Batu Betumpang	5	33779
19.03.04	Simpang Rimba ^{(b)}	362.30	21,196	23,848	27,392	Simpang Rimba	7	33777
19.03.01	Toboali ^{(c)}	1,460.34	65,138	77,212	87,358	Teladan	11 ^{(d)}	33783
19.03.06	Tukak Sadai	126.00	9,945	12,787	14,461	Tiram	5	33784
19.03.03	Air Gegas	853.64	37,748	41,856	45,208	Air Gegas	10	33782
19.03.02	Lepar (island) ^{(e)}	172.31	11,706	7,957	8,319	Tanjung Labu	4	33792
19.03.08	Kepulauan Pongok ^{(e)} (Pongok Islands)	89.67	^{(f)}	4,287	4,234	Pongok	2	33791
	Totals	3,607.08	172,528	198,189	219,904	Toboali	53	

Notes: (a) includes 3 offshore islands. (b) includes 6 offshore islands. (c) includes 22 offshore islands.
(d) includes three kelurahan - Tanjung Ketapang, Teladan and Toboali. (e) Lepar Pongok and Kepulauan Pongok Districts between them include 28 offshore islands.
(f) the population of Kepulauan Pongok District for 2010 is included with the figure for Lepar District, from which it was divided in 2013.
