= Belitung Regency =

Regency in Bangka Belitung Islands, Indonesia

Belitung Regency Kabupaten Belitung
- Regency
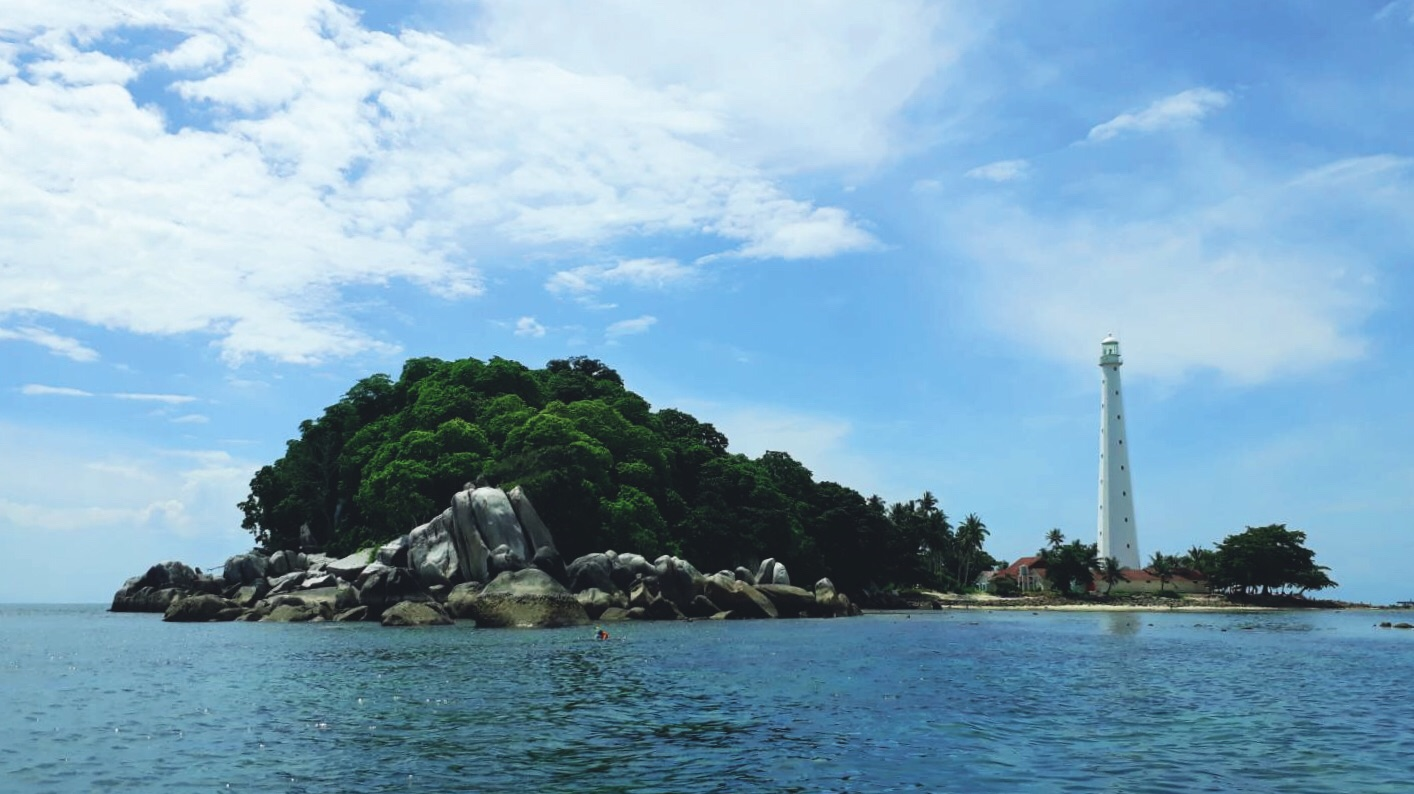
- Lengkuas Island

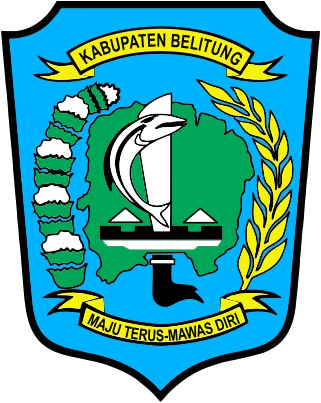
- Coat of arms
- Motto: Go Forward Introspective; Maju terus mawas diri (Indonesian)
- Location within Bangka Belitung Islands

- Location in Sumatra and Indonesia Belitung Regency (Indonesia)
- Coordinates: 2°52′S 107°42′E
- Country: Indonesia
- Province: Bangka Belitung Islands
- Regency seat: Tanjung Pandan

Government
  - Regent: Djoni Alamsyah Hidayat
  - Vice Regent: Syamsir

Area
  - Total: 2,269.36 km^{2} (876.20 sq mi)

Population (mid 2025 estimate)
  - Total: 194,392
  - Density: 85.6594/km^{2} (221.857/sq mi)
- Time zone: UTC+7 (IWST)
- Area code: (+62) 719
- Website: portal.belitungkab.go.id

Belitung Regency is a regency (kabupaten) of Bangka Belitung Islands Province, Indonesia, with the town of Tanjungpandan as the regency seat. It formerly covered the whole of Belitung island, but on 25 February 2003 the eastern districts on the island have been cut out to create a new East Belitung Regency (Belitung Timur). The regency now covers just the western half of the island, together with the smaller island of Mendanau off its west coast, with a total land area of 2,269.36 km^{2}, and had a population of 156,765 at the 2010 Census and 182,079 at the 2020 Census; the official estimate as of mid 2025 was 194,392 (comprising 98,971 males and 95,421 females).

== Administrative districts ==
The Regency is divided into five districts (kecamatan), tabulated below with their areas and their populations at the 2010 Census and the 2020 Census, together with the official estimates as at mid 2025. The table includes the number of administrative villages (totaling 42 rural desa and 7 urban kelurahan) and the number of offshore islands in each district, together with its post code.

Kode Wilayah	Name of District (kecamatan)	Area in km^{2}	Pop'n Census 2010	Pop'n Census 2020	Pop'n Estimate 2025	No. of kelurahan	No. of desa	Total No. of villages	No. of islands	Post code
19.02.02	Membalong	941.11	24,295	26,833	27,615		12	12	30	33452
19.02.01	Tanjungpandan	181.48	86,487	103,062	111,243	7 ^{(a)}	9	16	5	33411 - 33417
19.02.05	Badau	496.25	12,821	15,168	16,097		7	7	8	33451
19.02.04	Sijuk	480.00	26,816	31,342	33,736		10	10	39	33414
19.02.03	Selat Nasik ^{(b)}	170.52	6,346	5,674	5,701		4	4	28	33481
	Total	2,269.36	156,765	182,079	194,392	7	42	49	108	

Note: (a) the 7 urban kelurahan (with their populations as at 2024) are Pangkallalang (13,092), Paal Satu (8,419), Lesung Batang (6,937), Parit (5,436), Tanjungpendam (5,269), Kota Tanjung Pandan (4,072) and Kampong Damai (3,936), while the most populous of the 9 desa are Air Saga (12,421), Aik Rayak (10,286), Air Merbau (8,456) and Aik Pelempang Jaya (7,285). The remaining desa, which form a cordon with lower population densities around the urban area, are Dukong (6,501), Perawas (5,316), Aik Ketekok (5,504), Buluh Tambung (4,217) and Juru Seberang (2,716).
(b) comprises Mendanau Island, the fourth largest island within the province, together with smaller islands surrounding Mendanau.

== Transportation ==
- H.A.S. Hanandjoeddin International Airport (Bandar udara International Has Hanandjoedin), serving flights to Jakarta, Palembang, Pangkalpinang with Garuda Indonesia.

Laskar Pelangi Port

- International terminal
- Local terminal
