= Sungai Selan =

District of Indonesia

- District
- Location of Sungai Selan in Bangka-Belitung
- Coordinates: 02°23′02″S 105°58′48″E
- Country: Indonesia
- Province: Bangka Belitung Islands
- Regency: Central Bangka Regency

Area
  - Total: 789.83 km^{2} (304.96 sq mi)

Population (2020)
  - Total: 39,100
  - Density: 49.5/km^{2} (128/sq mi)
- Time zone: UTC+7 (Western Indonesia Time)
- Area code: +62718

Sungai Selan is a town (kelurahan) and an administrative district (kecamatan) of Central Bangka Regency, in the Bangka-Belitung province of Indonesia.

== History ==
Sungai Selan was the initial point for the spread of Catholicism into Bangka, originating from Catholic Chinese physician Tsjen On Ngie (1795–1871) who moved from Penang into Sungai Selan in 1830, and his house gradually became a makeshift chapel with statues and prayer rooms. By 1853, a resident priest had been assigned to the area, and although the number of Catholics fluctuated (recorded at 379 in 1967, mainly Chinese migrant workers who often returned to China), a Capuchin friar was assigned to Sungai Selan in 1912, until 1918 when shifts in the tin mining industry resulted in a relocation of the mission to Pangkal Pinang. During this period, a beriberi outbreak in 1883 amongst Chinese migrant workers killed half of the congregation. The Sungai Selan mission was the first Catholic mission in the Dutch East Indies outside Java.

During a Dutch administrative organization of Bangka Island in 1854, Sungai Selan was one of nine districts defined. Following Indonesian independence, a reorganization of administrative divisions of Bangka in 2003 placed Sungai Selan in the Central Bangka Regency.

== Administration ==
Sungai Selan is subdivided into the urban village (kelurahan) of Sungai Selan which serves as the administrative centre of the district, and twelve regular villages (desa).

== Economy ==
Agriculture and tin mining comprises the largest sources of employment in the district, with oil palm and black pepper being major commodities.

The district hosts a river port on the Selan River, operated by the government-owned PT Pelindo II. The port serves speedboats crossing from South Sumatra, and handles around 200 tons of cargo daily.
