= Lepar Island =

Island in South Bangka Regency, Bangka Belitung Islands Province, Indonesia

Lepar
Native name: Pulau Lepar
- Location of Lepar in Bangka-Belitung

Geography
- Coordinates: 2°57′S 106°49′E
- Area: 172.31 km^{2} (66.53 sq mi)

Administration
- Indonesia
- Province: Bangka Belitung Islands
- Regency: South Bangka
- District: Lepar Pongok

Demographics
- Population: 8,319 (2025)
- Pop. density: 48.3/km^{2} (125.1/sq mi)

Lepar (Indonesian: Pulau Lepar) is an island in Indonesia, located off the southeastern coast of Bangka. Administratively part of South Bangka in Bangka Belitung province, it is the third-largest island in the province after its much larger namesakes Bangka and Belitung, with an area of 172.31 square km. Lepar sits in the Gaspar Strait which separates the two larger islands of Bangka and Belitung. It stretches about 22 km east–west and 17 km north–south, with the towns of Tanjunglabu, Tanjungsangkar and Penutuk being the main population centers. It is governed as its own administrative district of Kecamatan Lepar, which used to include a nearby, medium-sized island of Pongok until 2012 when they two islands were separated so that each became its own district.

== Geography ==
The island is largely flat with no prominent elevations, with the southeastern side having the steepest slopes. It is separated by Bangka by a strait known as the Lepar Strait. The island is surrounded by about a dozen tiny islands, some of which are uninhabited. Four small rivers flow in the island, named Pangku, Elang, Bunut and Bayan.

== Administrative divisions ==
Lepar is divided into 4 villages (desa), which also technically include the smaller islands surrounding Lepar:

Village	Area (km^{2})	Population
Penutuk	44.14	2,776
Tanjung Labu	47.46	2,115
Tanjung Sangkar	51.61	2,403
Kumbung	29.10	663

These villages are further subdivided into multiple orchards (dusun), totaling 12 throughout the district, including settlements of Lepar.

== Economy and facilities ==
Agriculture and fisheries dominate the district's economy, employing about 2,650 and 1,150 people respectively in 2016. Agricultural commodities include palm oil, rubber and pepper. A palm oil plantation company holds usage rights to just over half the island, with a concession of 8,500 hectares. Unconventional tin mining also employs 200.

Public schools are present, with 5 elementary schools (SD), 3 junior high schools (SMP) and a senior high school (SMA) alongside a private Islamic school.
