= Gelasa Strait =

Strait in Indonesia

- Selat Gelasa (Indonesian)
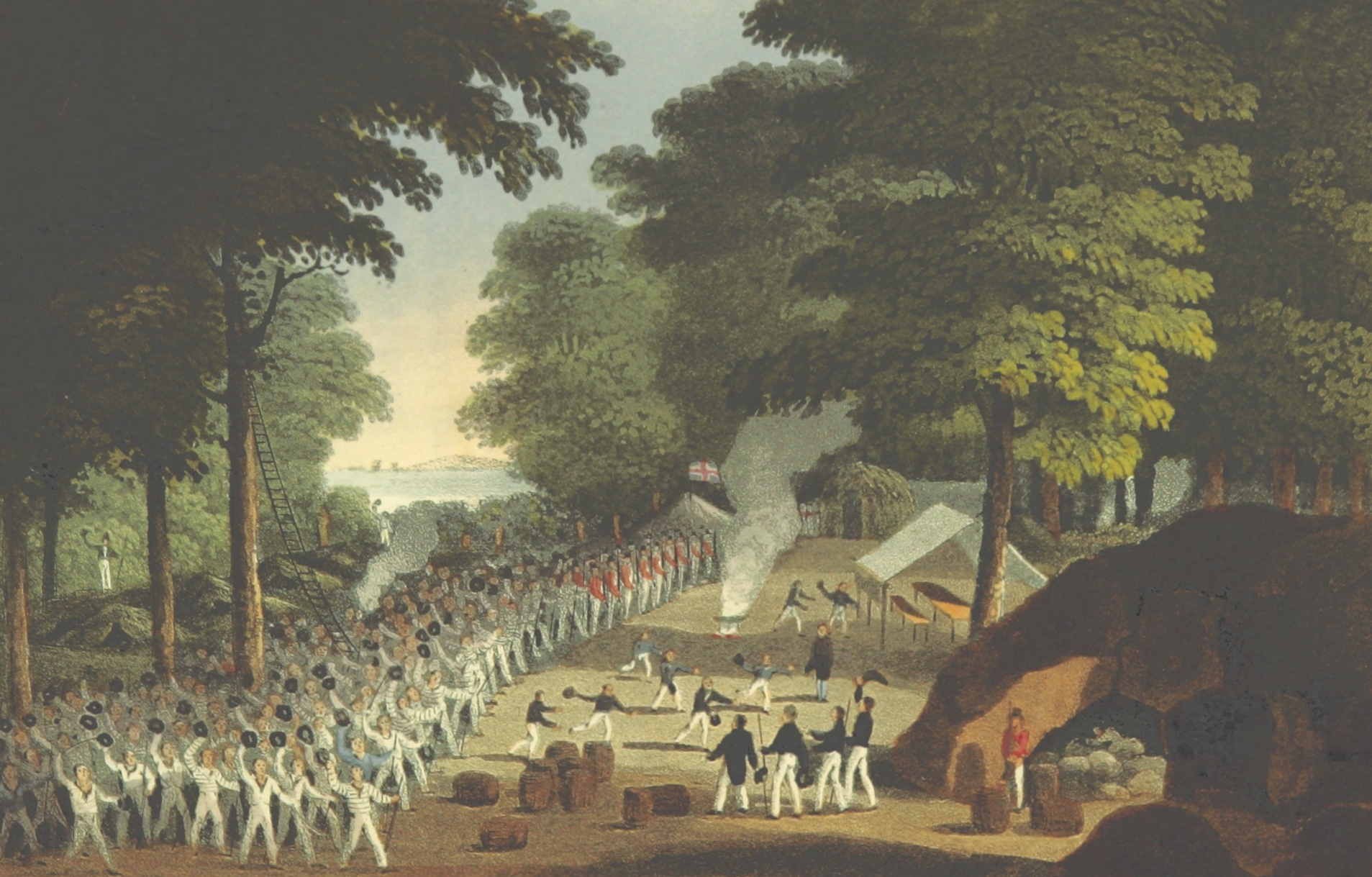
- The encampment Fort Maxwell, set up in 1817 on Pulo Leat (Pongok Island), Gaspar Strait, by survivors of the wreck of HMS Alceste

- Location within Sumatra
- Coordinates: 2°40′S 107°15′E
- Type: Strait
- Basin countries: Indonesia
- References: Selat Gaspar: Indonesia National Geospatial-Intelligence Agency, Bethesda, MD, USA

The Gelasa Strait (Indonesian: Selat Gelasa) (formerly Gaspar Strait) is a strait separating the Indonesian islands Belitung (formerly English: Billiton) and Bangka. It connects the Java Sea with the South China Sea.

== Etymology ==
The old name Gaspar is after a Spanish captain, who passed through it in 1724 en route from Manila to Spain. Meanwhile Gelasa is the name of a small island located at the strait.

== Geography ==
The strait lies off the east coast of Sumatra, and is formed between the large islands Bangka and Belitung. Pulau Lait, or Middle Island, separates the strait into two principal branches.

The western branch, between Pulau Lait and the southeastern part of Bangka, is often called the Macclesfield Strait. The eastern branch, between Middle Island, and Long Island, near Belitung, is generally called Clements' Strait, after Captain Clements, who commanded the fleet from China that went through it in July 1781.

Gaspar Island, or Pulau Gelasa, 2°24′42″S 107°4′10″E, lies approximately 24 miles north of Middle Island 2°52′0″S 107°4′0″E and approximately 18 miles from Tanjung Berikat 2°34′21″S 106°50′43″E. The largest islands in the strait are Lepar, Pongok and Mendanau.

== History ==
Prior to the Spanish captain's passage through the strait in 1724, Captain Hurle, returning from China in the British East India Company ship Macclesfield, had passed through, in March 1701.

Over time, the strait came to be part of the main shipping route between Singapore and the Sunda Strait (which separates Sumatra from Java, and is an entrance to the Indian Ocean). The waters in and around the strait had many navigational hazards, and the strait itself, although frequently used, was considered to be especially perilous. According to the Great Britain Hydrographic Department's The China Sea Directory, vol. 1 (1878):

"Many fine ships have been lost in Gaspar strait; not a few on the Alceste reef, from wrongly estimating their distance from the land; but the majority of instances from causes which might have been guarded against by the exercise of due care and judgment."

On 6 February 1822, the Tek Sing, a large three-masted Chinese ocean-going junk, sank in an area of the South China Sea known as the Belvidere Shoals, near the northern entrance to the strait.

In 1854, the British Admiralty first issued an Admiralty chart of the strait. It was based on surveys conducted by the United States Navy. The chart was continually updated, most notably following surveys conducted by W. Stanton, a Royal Navy a sailing master, in 1861, and with the assistance of Dutch charts, prepared by the then colonial ruler of the then Dutch East Indies (now Indonesia).

== Wreck discovery ==
In 1998, fishermen discovered a block of coral encrusted with pieces of ceramic, at the depth of about 16 metres.

From a large jar they removed several bowls intact. These divers by chance had just made the greatest underwater archeological discovery ever made in Southeast Asia: a 9th-century Arab dhow, loaded with over 60,000 gold and silver objects, and manufactured ceramics under the Tang dynasty. The boat and its cargo, dubbed Belitung shipwreck, testified that Tang China was producing mass-produced commercial items that it exported by sea. Arab sailors were clearly travelling along the maritime silk route, trading at a great scale and over long distances.

The port of departure and the destination of the dhow are unknown. Most scholars believe dhow was heading to the Middle East, probably from Guangzhou (Canton), the largest port on the Silk Road. Many Arabs and Persians lived in Guangzhou in the 9th century. Among the tens of thousands of bowls found in the wreck, one bore this inscription: The sixteenth day of the seventh month of the second year of the reign of Baoli, or 826 apr. The mass-produced nature of the cargo and the geographical diversity of its production suggest that it was an export item made to order.
