= Manggar =

- Town/District
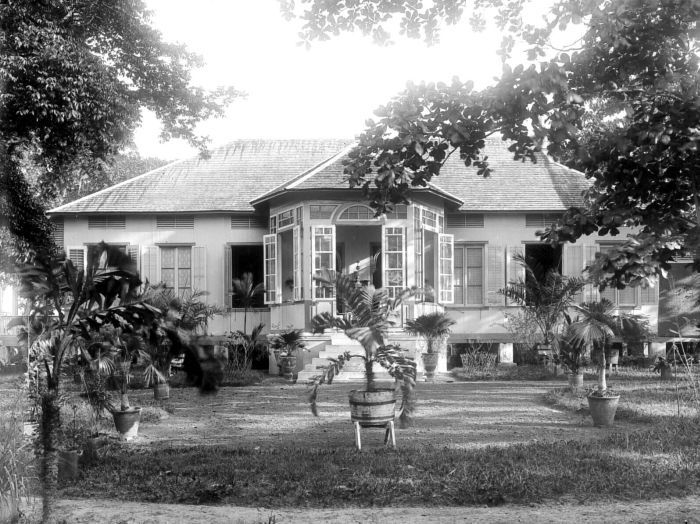
- House of a Billiton Maatschappij in Manggar in the time of the Dutch East Indies

- Location within Bangka Belitung Islands
- Coordinates: 2°53′24″S 108°16′12″E
- Country: Indonesia
- Province: Bangka Belitung
- Regency: East Belitung
- Established: 9 October 1871

Area
  - Total: 229 km^{2} (88 sq mi)

Population
  - Estimate (2020 Census): 39,135
- Time zone: UTC+7 (Indonesia Western Time)

Manggar (Indonesian pronunciation: [ˈmaŋɡar]; Chinese: 芒加尔) is a town in the Indonesian province of Bangka-Belitung, Indonesia which is a port on the east coast of Belitung Island, and is the seat of the East Belitung Regency. The town was founded as a tin mining town in the 19th century.

== History ==
In the 1860s, the Dutch prospectors of the Billiton Maatschappij explored the area and established the mining district of Burung Mandi Lenggang. In 1863, a tin mine was established on the right banks of the Manggar River, and the district was renamed to Manggar district in 1866. Manggar was opened to immigration of "foreign orientals" (Asian foreigners) on 8 October 1871, which is selected as the establishment date for the district.

In late 1945, during the early stages of the Indonesian National Revolution, the Dutch authorities reoccupied the town although they encountered some resistance from the newly formed Indonesian Armed Forces. After Indonesian independence, the Manggar district was one of the four districts comprising the island of Belitung by the 1980s. Manggar became the seat of the East Belitung Regency after its formation in 2003.

== Demographics ==
39,135 people lived in Manggar at the 2020 census – making it the most populous district in East Belitung and the second most populated in the island behind Tanjung Pandan. The sex ratio is 104.5 males to 100 females.

== Administrative division ==
The district of Manggar is further subdivided into nine villages. Out of these, three – Kelubi, Buku Limau, and Bentaian Jaya – are classified by Statistics Indonesia as "rural" (desa), while the rest are "urban" (kelurahan).

Village	Area (in km^{2})	Population (2020 Census)
Kelubi	85.91	2,690
Padang	96.00	7,519
Lalang	3.25	4,909
Lalang Jaya	1.38	3,515
Kurnia Jaya	2.40	5,549
Baru	2.70	9,564
Buku Limau	3.90	694
Bentaian Jaya	32.09	1,622
Mekar Jaya	1.37	3,073

For elections of East Belitung's municipal council, Manggar shares an electoral district with the neighboring district of Simpang Renggiang.

== Notable people ==
- Yusril Ihza Mahendra (born 1956), lawyer and national politician
- Basuki Tjahaja Purnama (born 1966), Governor of Jakarta (2014–2017)
