= Belitung =

Island in Indonesia

Belitung بليتوڠ (Jawi) 勿里洞 (Chinese)
Native name: Belitong
- Location within Sumatra Location within Indonesia

Geography
- Location: Southeast Asia
- Coordinates: 2°50′S 107°55′E
- Area: 4,776.27 km^{2} (1,844.13 sq mi)
- Highest elevation: 500 m (1600 ft)
- Highest point: Mount Tajam

Administration
- Indonesia
- Province: Bangka Belitung Islands
- Regency: Belitung Regency, East Belitung Regency
- Largest settlement: Tanjung Pandan

Demographics
- Population: 327,835 (mid 2025 estimate)
- Pop. density: 68.6/km^{2} (177.7/sq mi)

Belitung (Belitung Malay: Belitong, formerly Billiton) is an island on the east coast of Sumatra, Indonesia in the Java Sea. It covers 4,776.27 km^{2} (1,844.1 sq mi) (including offshore islands such as Mendanau Island), and had a population of 309,097 at the 2020 Census; the official estimate as at mid 2025 was 327,835. Administratively, it forms two regencies (Belitung Regency and East Belitung Regency) within the province of Bangka-Belitung Islands. The island is known for its pepper and for its tin. It was in the possession of the United Kingdom from 1812 until Britain ceded control of the island to the Netherlands in the Anglo-Dutch Treaty of 1824. Its main town is Tanjung Pandan. The United Nations Educational, Scientific and Cultural Organization has declared 17 tourist attractions in the Belitung Geopark as a world geopark.

== Demography ==
The population was 262,357 at the 2010 Census and 309,097 in the 2020 Census; the official estimate as at mid 2023 was 320,500. The population is centered in several small towns; the largest are Tanjung Pandan in the west and Manggar in the east, which are the respective capitals of the two Regencies (Belitung and Belitung Timur) into which the island is administratively divided. While ethnic Bangka Malays people make up the largest percentage along with Chinese people, Belitung has significant populations of Bugis, Sundanese, and Javanese people who formerly worked for the Dutch, mining tin. There is also a small population of Madurese who were settled there in the Suharto era transmigration.

== Religion ==
Belitung is a religiously diverse island. Sunni Islam is the most widely practiced religion, with sizeable minorities of Buddhists, Christians and Confucianists.

== Transportation ==
On Belitung island, the only airport is in Belitung Regency; that is, the H.A.S. Hanandjoeddin International Airport maintains a series of connecting flights to Pangkal Pinang Airport, as well as a plane to Soekarno-Hatta International Airport. International flights via Singapore's Changi International Airport are through Garuda Indonesia airlines.

Flag carrier Garuda Indonesia has four direct flights from Singapore. The Singapore-Tanjung Pandan direct flight operates four times weekly – departing at 5:20 pm on Mondays, Wednesdays, and Fridays, and 5:30 pm on Sundays.

Belitung Island has four ports; three in Belitung Regency and one in East Belitung Regency, serving cargo ships and ferry ships.

Online taxi services (such as Gojek and Grab) are available, as well as standard taxicabs, the taxi bandara (airport taxi) and commonly-hailed street taxis.

== Geography ==
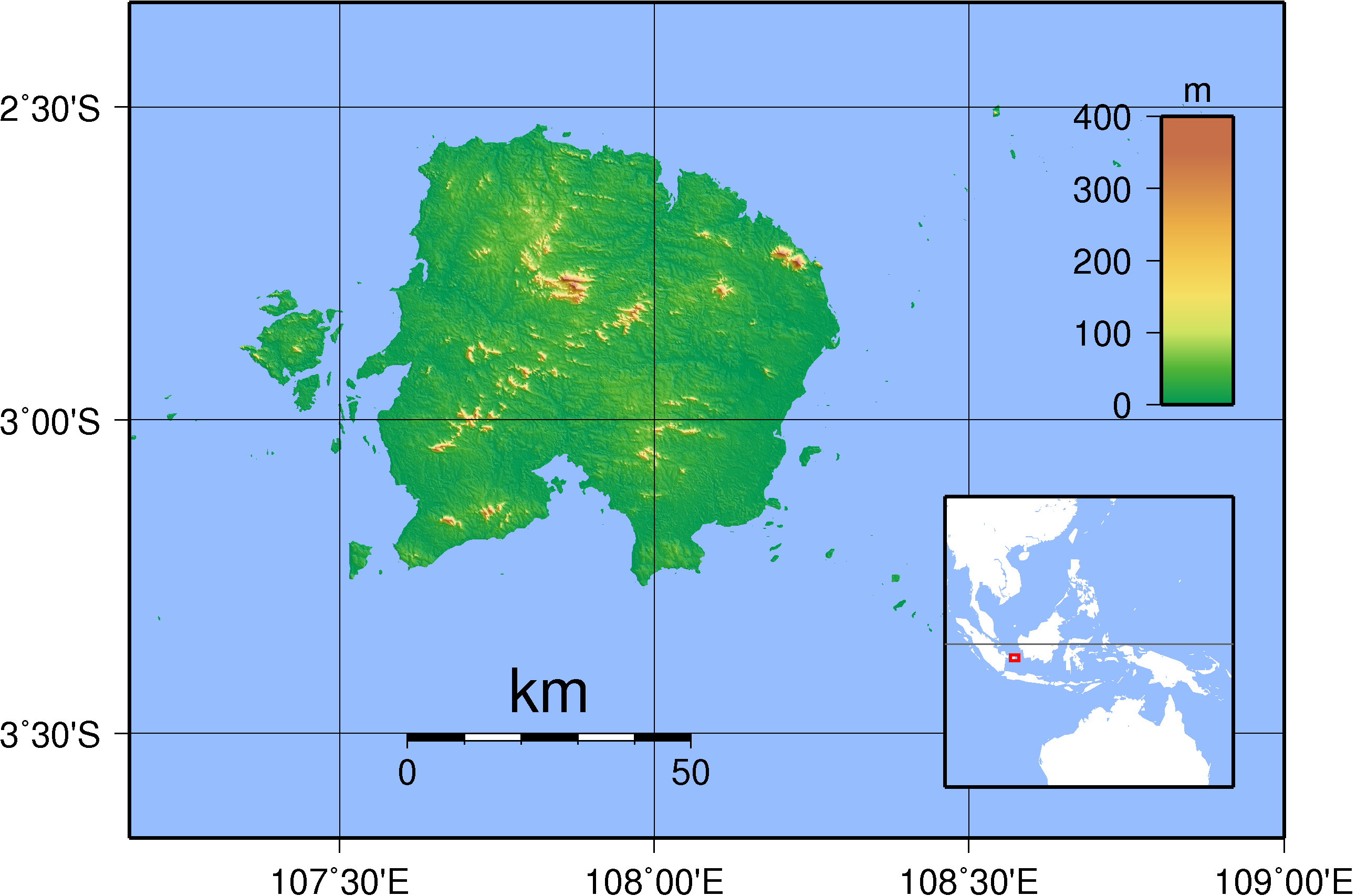
Topography of Belitung island

Belitung is a medium-sized island (at about 1,844.13 square miles (4,776.3 km^{2})), also encompassing smaller adjacent islands, of which Mendanau Island to the west of Belitung is the largest. Belitung consists of moderately-rugged terrain and several hills. The highest point is Mount Tajam, with a height of less than 500 metres (1,600 ft). The maritime boundaries of the province include Bangka Strait to the west, Karimata Strait to the east, Natuna Sea to the north, and the Java Sea to the south. The Gaspar Strait runs north–south (between the islands of Bangka and Belitung), connecting the Java Sea to the Natuna Sea and, further north, the South China Sea. Its surrounding turquoise blue seas are moderately calm and shallow, making for great sailing, snorkeling and swimming. Belitung is popular for its abstract granite boulders and brilliant, white-sand beaches in Tanjung Tinggi, Tanjung Kelayang, Tanjung Binga and Lengkuas island.

== Economy ==
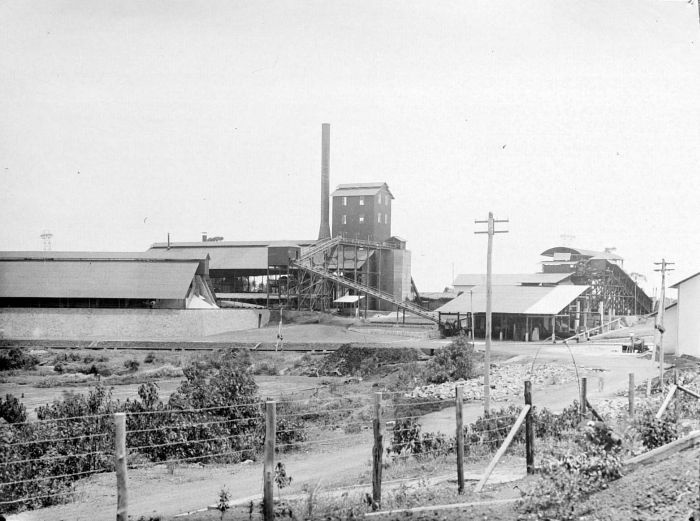
Part of the plant of NV Billiton Maatschappij company in Belitung island, 1939.

Belitung is a source of tin, clay, iron ore and silica sands. The Dutch mining company NV Billiton Maatschappij derives its name from the island's name. Billiton merged with BHP in 2001 to form BHP Billiton.

The island is also a producer of fishery products, pepper, coconut, and palm oil. People work as farmers, fishermen and miners. The island is easily accessible with eight daily 1-hour flights from Jakarta and 2 daily flights, with duration of 30 minutes and 50 minutes each, from Pangkal Pinang.

With white sand beaches and offshore islands as the main drivers, tourism is growing.

=== Tourist destinations ===
The main tourist destinations are beaches and offshore islands/islets. The beaches are Tanjung Tinggi Beach and Tanjung Kelayang Beach, both of which have clear blue water, sand, and rocky beaches. The islands/islets are Batu Berlayar Island, which is mostly granite, Pasir Island, which is a tidal island made of sand (= pasir in Indonesian), Bird Islet (Pulau Burong, accessed from Tanjung Binga beach on foot at low tide, Lengkuas Island, which is the home of a 129-year-old lighthouse and a good place for snorkeling, and Babi Island and Kelayang Islet.

== See also ==
- Belitung shipwreck
- Indonesia AirAsia Flight 8501
