= East Belitung Regency =

Regency in Bangka Belitung Islands, Indonesia

East Belitung Regency Kabupaten Belitung Timur
- Regency
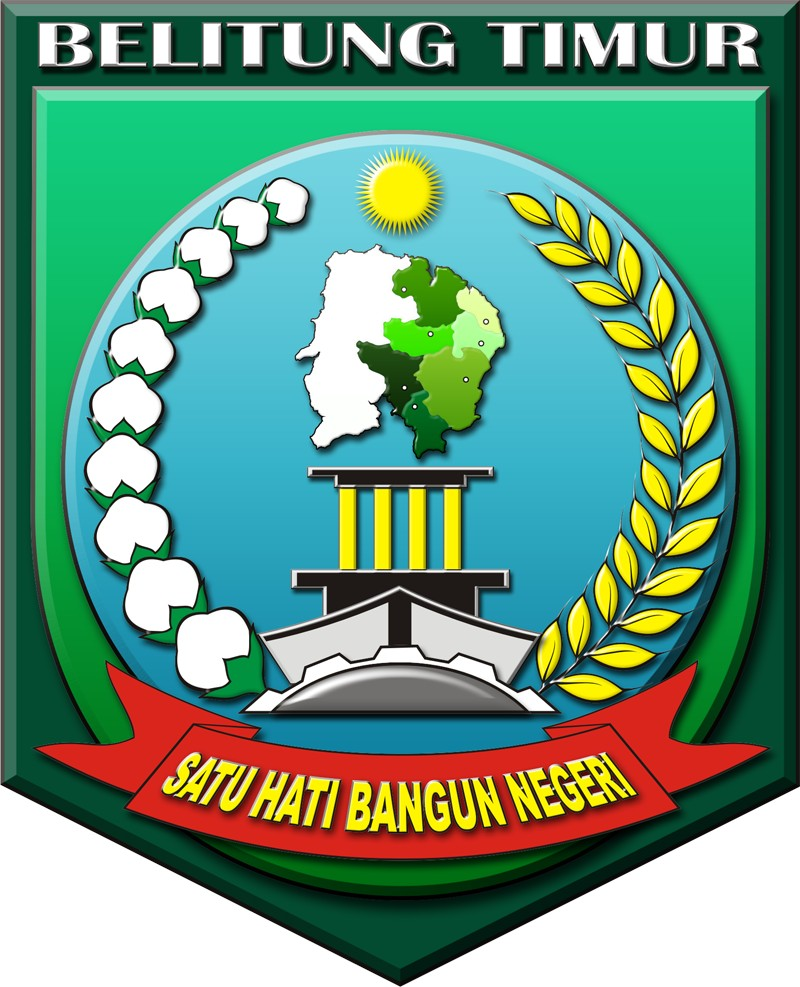
- Coat of arms
- Motto(s): Satu Hati Bangun Negeri (One Heart Building the Nation)
- Location within Bangka Belitung Islands

- Location in Sumatra and Indonesia East Belitung Regency (Indonesia)
- Coordinates: 2°54′S 108°03′E
- Country: Indonesia
- Province: Bangka Belitung Islands
- Regency seat: Manggar

Government
  - Regent: Kamarudin Muten
  - Vice Regent: Khairil Anwar

Area
  - Total: 2,506.91 km^{2} (967.92 sq mi)

Population (mid 2025 estimnate)
  - Total: 133,443
  - Density: 53.2301/km^{2} (137.865/sq mi)
- Time zone: UTC+7 (IWST)
- Area code: (+62) 719
- Website: belitungtimurkab.go.id

East Belitung Regency (Kabupaten Belitung Timur) is a regency (kabupaten) of Bangka Belitung Islands Province, Indonesia, encompassing the eastern half of Belitung Island. It was cut out on 25 February 2003 from Belitung Regency, which until then had covered the whole island. East Belitung Regency covers a land area of 2,506.91 km^{2} (including 141 offshore islands) and had a population of 106,463 at the 2010 Census and 127,018 at the 2020 Census; the official estimate as of mid 2025 was 133,443 (comprising 68,579 males and 64,864 females). Its regency seat is the town of Manggar.

== Administrative districts ==
The Regency is administratively divided into seven districts (kecamatan), tabulated below with their areas and their populations at the 2010 Census and 2020 Census, together with the official estimates as of mid 2025. The table also includes the locations of the district administrative centres, the number of administrative villages (all classed as rural desa) and the number of offshore islands in each district, and its postal codes.

Kode Wilayah	Name of District (kecamatan)	Area in km^{2}	Pop'n Census 2010	Pop'n Census 2020	Pop'n Estimate mid 2025	Admin centre	No. of villages	No. of islands	Post codes
19.06.03	Dendang	362.20	9,346	11,007	11,148	Dendang	4	37	33561
19.06.07	Simpang Pesak	243.30	7,380	8,434	8,818	Simpang Pesak	4	-	33560
19.06.02	Gantung	546.30	22,440	28,349	31,248	Gantung	7	52	33562
19.06.06	Simpang Renggiang	390.70	6,629	7,512	7,770	Renggiang	4	-	33563
19.06.01	Manggar	229.00	33,366	39,135	40,839	Padang	9	40	33511, 33512, 33516, 33517.
19.06.05	Damar	236.90	11,110	13,214	13,970	Mengkubang	5	-	33571
19.06.04	Kelapa Kampit	498.51	16,192	19,367	19,650	Mentawak	6	12	33572
	Totals	2,506.91	106,463	127,018	133,443	Manggar	39	141	
