= Toboali =

- Town
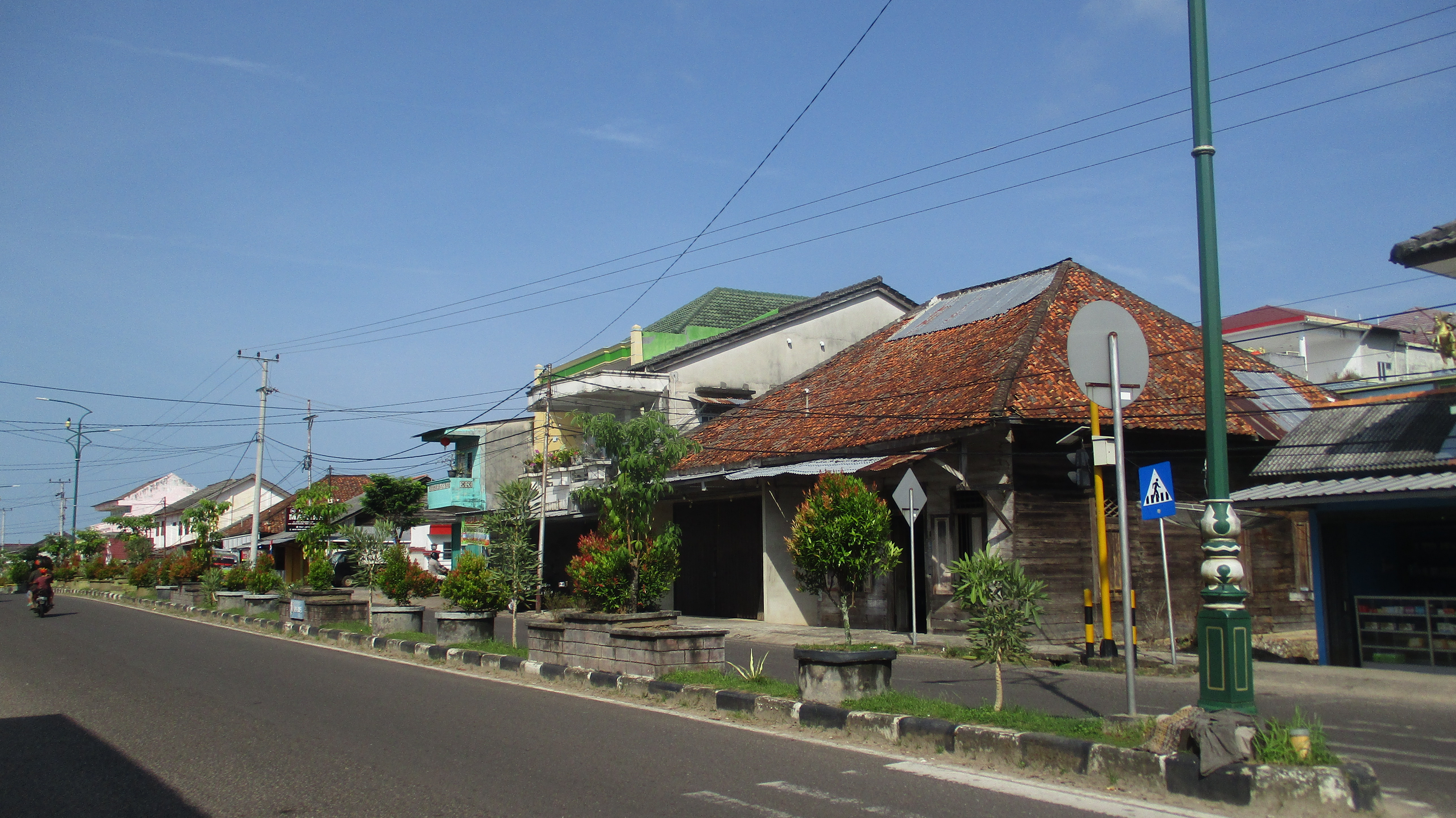
- Jenderal Sudirman Street in Toboali, February 2022.

- Location within Bangka Belitung Islands
- Coordinates: 2°59′59″S 106°27′56″E
- Country: Indonesia
- Province: Bangka Belitung
- Regency: South Bangka Regency

Area
  - Total: 1,460.34 km^{2} (563.84 sq mi)

Population (2010)
  - Total: 65,138
  - Estimate (2025): 87,358
  - Density: 59.8/km^{2} (155/sq mi)
- Time zone: UTC+7 (Indonesia Western Time)

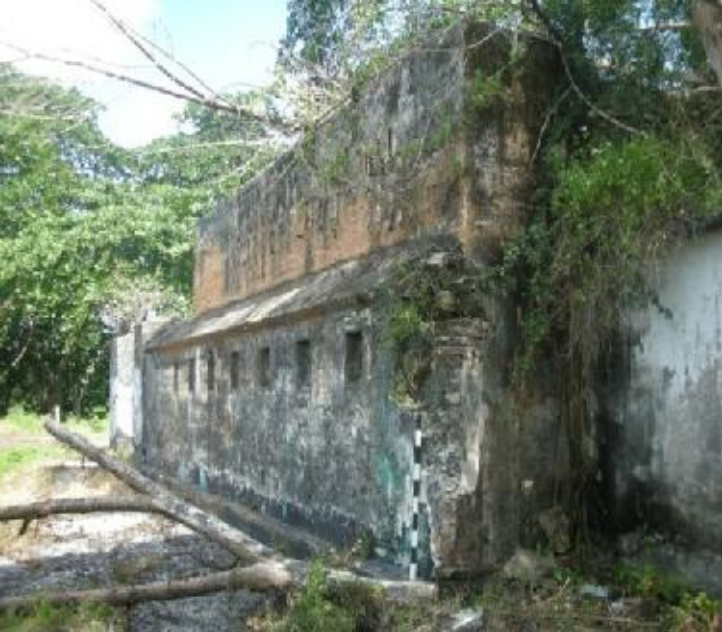
The fort of Toboali was built in 1825 to defend Bangka's tin mines

Toboali (Indonesian pronunciation: [t̪oboˈali]; Chinese: 都保里) is a town (kelurahan) and an administrative district (kecamatan) in the Indonesian province of Bangka-Belitung, Indonesia. Toboali is the capital of the South Bangka Regency.

== Economy ==
Significant numbers of the townspeople are employed in pepper cultivation. In the New Order era, tin mining was extensive across the province and a large number of the locals were employed either by the large tin mining corporations or by unconventional mines.

The tourism sector have been growing in the recent years. Tourist destinations include a Dutch-era fortress and the town's natural beaches. In 2016, the local government for the first time held a cultural carnival, aimed to increase the number of tourists coming to the town.

== Demographics ==
The majority of the people in Toboali are Hakka Chinese and Malay. The majority of Malays are Muslim, while the Chinese are Buddhist, Catholic or Protestant.

The urban part of the district is situated in its south and comprises the three urban villages (kelurahan) of Toboali (with 18,735 population in 2024), Teledan (17,016) and Tanjung Ketapang (12,267). The other 8 villages within the district are classed as rural desa.

== Climate ==
Toboali has a tropical rainforest climate (Af) with heavy rainfall year-round.

Climate data for Toboali
Month	Jan	Feb	Mar	Apr	May	Jun	Jul	Aug	Sep	Oct	Nov	Dec	Year
Mean daily maximum °C (°F)	29.2 (84.6)	29.6 (85.3)	30.3 (86.5)	30.9 (87.6)	31.4 (88.5)	31.0 (87.8)	31.0 (87.8)	31.5 (88.7)	31.7 (89.1)	31.7 (89.1)	30.8 (87.4)	29.9 (85.8)	30.8 (87.4)
Daily mean °C (°F)	26.3 (79.3)	26.5 (79.7)	26.8 (80.2)	27.2 (81.0)	27.6 (81.7)	27.2 (81.0)	27.1 (80.8)	27.4 (81.3)	27.4 (81.3)	27.7 (81.9)	27.1 (80.8)	26.7 (80.1)	27.1 (80.8)
Mean daily minimum °C (°F)	23.5 (74.3)	23.5 (74.3)	23.4 (74.1)	23.6 (74.5)	23.8 (74.8)	23.4 (74.1)	23.3 (73.9)	23.2 (73.8)	23.2 (73.8)	23.7 (74.7)	23.4 (74.1)	23.5 (74.3)	23.5 (74.2)
Average precipitation mm (inches)	221 (8.7)	167 (6.6)	205 (8.1)	212 (8.3)	255 (10.0)	194 (7.6)	139 (5.5)	123 (4.8)	109 (4.3)	196 (7.7)	265 (10.4)	262 (10.3)	2,348 (92.3)
Source: Climate-Data.org
