= Bangka Belitung Islands =

Province in Sumatra, Indonesia

Bangka Belitung Islands Kepulauan Bangka Belitung
- Province
- Province of Bangka Belitung Islands; Provinsi Kepulauan Bangka Belitung
- Coat of arms
- Nickname: Babel
- Motto: Serumpun Sebalai (Malay); One community, one family
- Bangka Belitung Islands in Indonesia
- Interactive map of Bangka Belitung Islands
- Coordinates: 2°6′S 106°6′E
- Country: Indonesia
- Region: Sumatra (Western Indonesia)
- Established: 4 December 2000
- Capital and largest city: Pangkalpinang

Government
  - Body: Bangka Belitung Islands Provincial Government
  - Governor: Hidayat Arsani (Golkar)
  - Vice Governor: Hellyana
  - Legislature: Bangka Belitung Islands Regional House of Representatives (DPRD)

Area
  - Total: 16,618.13 km^{2} (6,416.30 sq mi)
  - Rank: 30th in Indonesia
- Highest elevation (Gunung Bui): 665 m (2,182 ft)

Population (mid 2025 estimate)
  - Total: 1,555,196
  - Rank: 29th in Indonesia
  - Density: 93.58430/km^{2} (242.3822/sq mi)

Demographics
  - Ethnic groups: 71.66% Malays; 8.47% Javanese; 8.30% Chinese; 3.99% South Sumatrans; 7.58% other
  - Religion: 89.89% Islam; 4.51% Buddhism; 2.09% Protestantism; 2.02% Confucianism; 1.31% Catholicism; 0.08% Hinduism
  - Languages: Indonesian (Official); Bangka Malay; Belitung Malay; Hakka; Buginese; Loncong
- Time zone: UTC+7 (Indonesia Western Time)
- HDI (2024): ▲0.746 (17th) – high
- Website: babelprov.go.id

The Bangka Belitung Islands (Indonesian: Kepulauan Bangka Belitung) is a province of Indonesia. Situated off the southeastern coast of Sumatra, the province comprises two main land masses — the islands of Bangka and Belitung — and numerous smaller islands. Bangka Belitung is bordered by the Bangka Strait to the west, the Natuna Sea to the north, the Java Sea is to the south and the Karimata Strait to the east; the two principal islands are separated by the Gelasa Strait, within which lie lesser islands such as Lepar, Pongok (or Liak) and Mendanau.

The province's capital and largest city is Pangkalpinang. The province shares maritime borders with South Sumatra to the west, Riau Islands to the north, Banten, the Special Capital Region of Jakarta, West Java, and Central Java to the south, and West Kalimantan to the east. Bangka Belitung covers a land area of 16,618.13 km^{2} (6,416.30 sq mi) and had a population of 1,455,678 according to the 2020 census; the official estimate as at mid 2025 was 1,555,196.

Bangka Belitung has an equatorial climate with tropical rainforests, which, however, are disappearing due to deforestation. Mount Maras, located on the island of Bangka, is the province's highest point, with a height of 699 m (2,293 ft). There are several rivers in the province, such as the Sebuku River, Baturusa River, and the Mendo River. Bangka Belitung is ethnically, culturally and linguistically diverse; major ethnic groups including Malays, Chinese and Javanese. Indonesian is the official language, while the local Malay dialect and Hakka serves as the lingua franca of the province.

Historically, Bangka Belitung has been part of the kingdoms of Sriwijaya, Majapahit and Palembang, before becoming a colony of foreign empires (Dutch, British and Japanese). Bangka Belitung was a residency within the Dutch East Indies. Upon the independence of Indonesia, the region was administered as part of the province of Sumatra and subsequently of South Sumatra. Bangka Belitung officially became the 31st province of Indonesia on 4 December 2000.

== Etymology ==
The name "Bangka" is derived from the word wangka (वन्च, 'vanca') meaning "tin" in Sanskrit, because this region is rich in tin mining. The name "Wangka" first appeared along with the name "Swarnabhumi" in the Indian literary book Milindrapantha from the 1st century BC. Swarnabhumi is identified as the island of Sumatra, the strong allegation that the so-called "Wangka" is the island of Bangka. Louis-Charles Damais, in his book Epigraphy and History of the Nusantara, affirms that Bangka comes from the word vowel (vanca).

The name "Belitung" is derived from Billitonite meaning the Black Meteorite in Dutch, which is commonly found in the island of Belitung. This stone itself was discovered at the time of tin mining in Belitung. Later on, Dutch academics writing in East Indies publications began named the island Billitonite or Billiton. Nowadays, Billitonite or Black Meteorite, is a distinct souvenir from Belitung Island.

== History ==
Historical affiliations

Majapahit 14th century-1527
Palembang Sultanate 1527-1722
Dutch East India Company 1722-1799
United Kingdom 1812-1824
Dutch East Indies 1799–1812; 1824–1942
Empire of Japan 1942–1945
Indonesia 1945–present

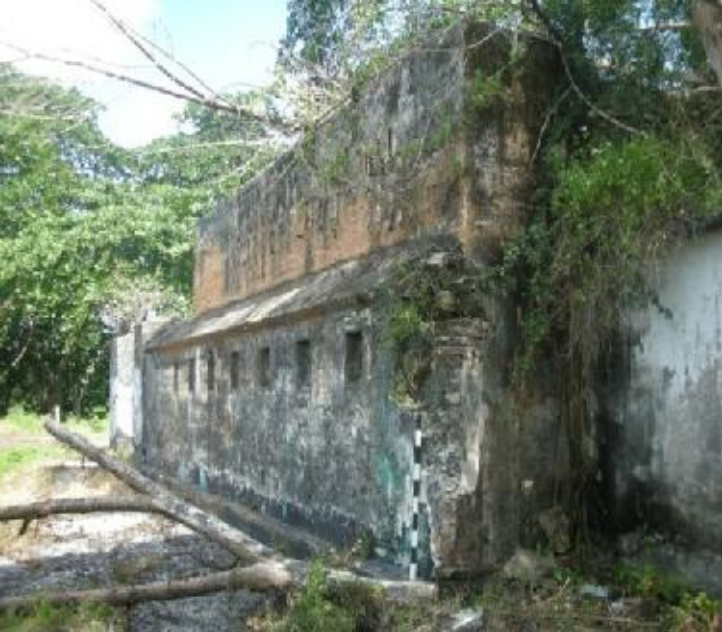
The fort of Toboali was built in 1825 to defend Bangka's tin mines

Bangka Belitung is an area that has a unique range of cultures and languages. Just like other provinces in Indonesia, Bangka Belitung were European and Japanese colonies. Prior to the colonial era, Bangka Belitung was part the Sriwijaya and Majapahit kingdoms who settled Bangka Belitung to expand their power.

The first Europeans arrived in Bangka was the British on 20 May 1812. However, with the Anglo-Dutch Treaty of 1824, the British left Bangka Belitung, and the Dutch took over. Due to the agreement, the Dutch were able to take control of the Pacific Islands. However, there was a coup attempt by local elite through Depati Barin and his son Depati Amir causing a war from 1849 to 1851 to oppose the colonization in Bangka Belitung, the war was won by the Dutch and Depati Amir was exiled to Kupang in East Nusa Tenggara. Depati Amir was memorialized as a national hero and his name was remembered through its regional airport, the Depati Amir Airport.

During WWII, the Empire of Japan briefly occupied the region. Following the surrender of Japan and the end of the war, the islands become part of an independent Indonesia.

Bangka Belitung has a long history of Chinese in-migration, mainly Hakka. Chinese people in the 13th century had started to migrate into the Bangka region. In the 17th century, the rulers of Palembang saw there was extraordinary potential and later they founded tin mines in Belitung. The tin mine was the main reason the Dutch decided to bring contract workers from mainland China, resettling in Belitung. The tin helped drive the island's development and make it the place it is today. Since then, some of the Chinese migrants returned to china while others decided to stay. The ones who decided to stay began assimilating with local people and this was followed by intermarriages. They live peacefully in spite of differences in religion and ethnicity. When anti-Chinese riots occurred in some parts of Indonesia at the end of the Suharto regime in 1998, the locals and those of Chinese descent were not much concerned and still lived peacefully in the Bangka Belitung province.

Bangka Belitung province was created as the 31st province by the Government of the Republic of Indonesia based on Law No. 27 of 2000, having been formerly part of the province of South Sumatra. The provincial capital is Pangkalpinang.

== Weather and climate ==
In 2007 the moisture in the Bangka Belitung Islands ranged from 77.4% to 87.3% with an average monthly reach of 83.1%, with a rainfall of 58.3 to 476.3 mm (2.30 to 18.75 in) and air pressure during 2007 approximately 1010.1 MBS. The average temperature during 2007 in the province reached 26.7 °C (80.1 °F) with an average maximum temperature of 29.9 °C (85.8 °F) and average minimum temperature of 24.9 °C (76.8 °F). The maximum air temperature was highest in October, with temperatures of 31.7 °C (89.1 °F), while the minimum temperature was lowest in February and March with temperatures of 23.2 °C (73.8 °F).

Bangka Belitung Islands have tropical climate influenced monsoons are experiencing a wet month for seven months throughout the year and dry month for five months continuously. In 2007 the dry months occurred in August to October with rainy days 11–15 days per month. For the month of wet rainy days 16–27 days per month, occurred in January to July and November to December.

== Geography ==
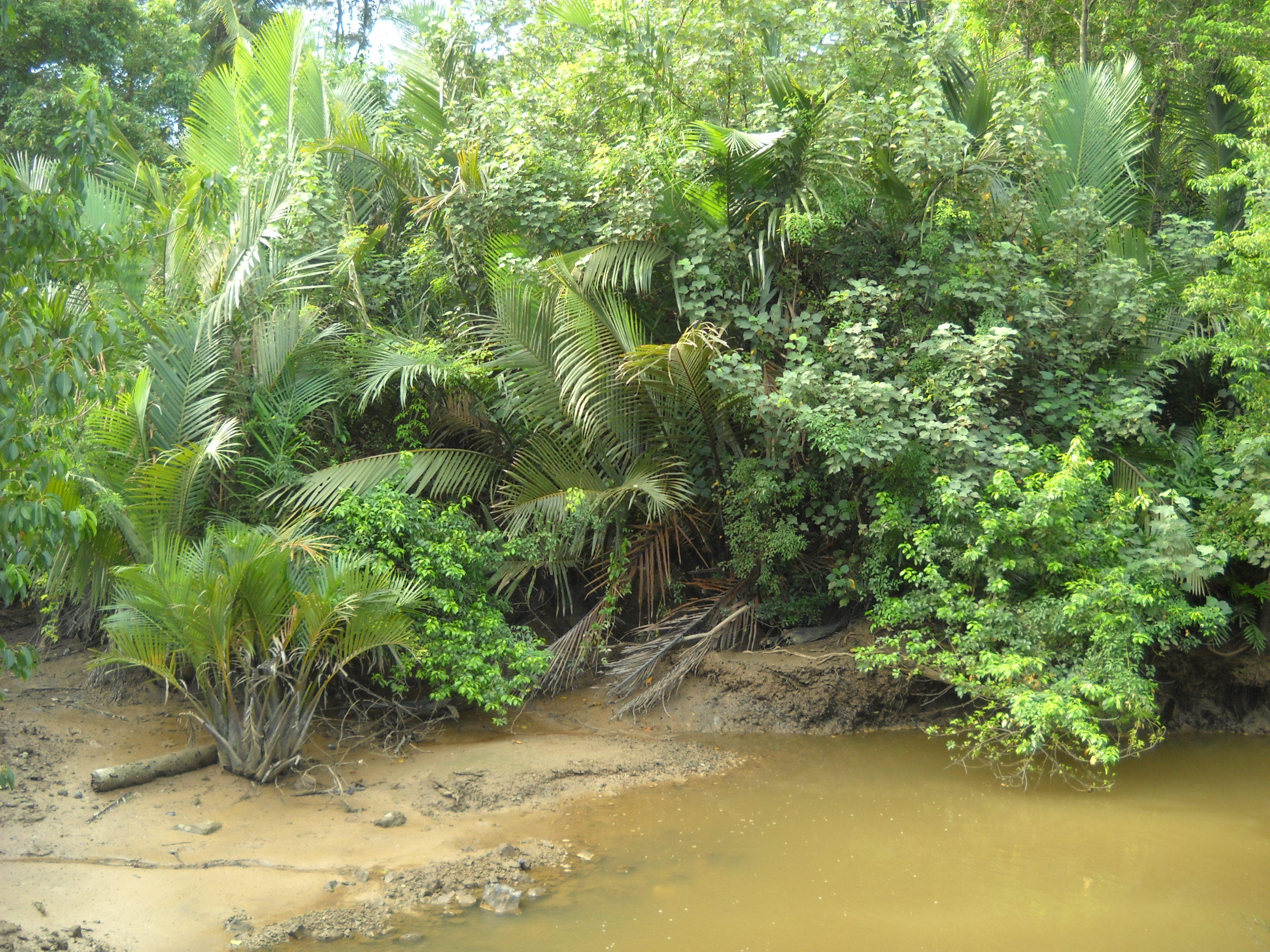
Marsh ecosystem in Bangka Island

Bangka Belitung is entirely surrounded by water. It is bordered by the Natuna Sea to the north, Karimata Strait to the east, Java Sea to the south and Bangka Strait to the west. The natural state of Bangka Belitung province is largely a plateau, valley and a small portion of the mountains and hills. Lowland altitude average of about 50 metres (160 ft) above sea level and altitude mountain areas among others to Mount Maras reach 699 metres (2,293 ft) in Belinyu District, Bangka. Mount Tajam Kaki height is approximately 500 metres (1,600 ft) above sea level on the island of Belitung. As for the hilly areas like Bukit Menumbing reaches a height of approximately 445 metres (1,460 ft) in the Bukit Nenas and Mangkol district with a height of about 395 metres (1,296 ft) above sea level in the Pangkalan Baru district. Soil in Bangka Belitung generally has a pH or acidic soil reaction averaging below 5, but has a very high aluminium content. Within it are various minerals, such as tin, sand, quartz sand, granite, kaolin, clay, and others.

The province is connected by sea waters and small islands. Bangka Belitung is an integral part of the plains of Sunda, so that its waters are part of the Sunda Shelf with a sea depth of no more than 30 metres. As regards the water area, Bangka Belitung has two types of waters, namely the open waters and semi-enclosed waters. Open water contained around Bangka island located to the north, east and south of the island of Bangka. While there is a semi-enclosed waters in the straits and bays Kelabat Bangka in Bangka North. Waters on the island of Belitung are generally open. In addition, as the territorial waters of the sea, the area of Bangka Belitung Island also has many rivers such as Baturusa, Layang, Manise, and Kurau rivers.

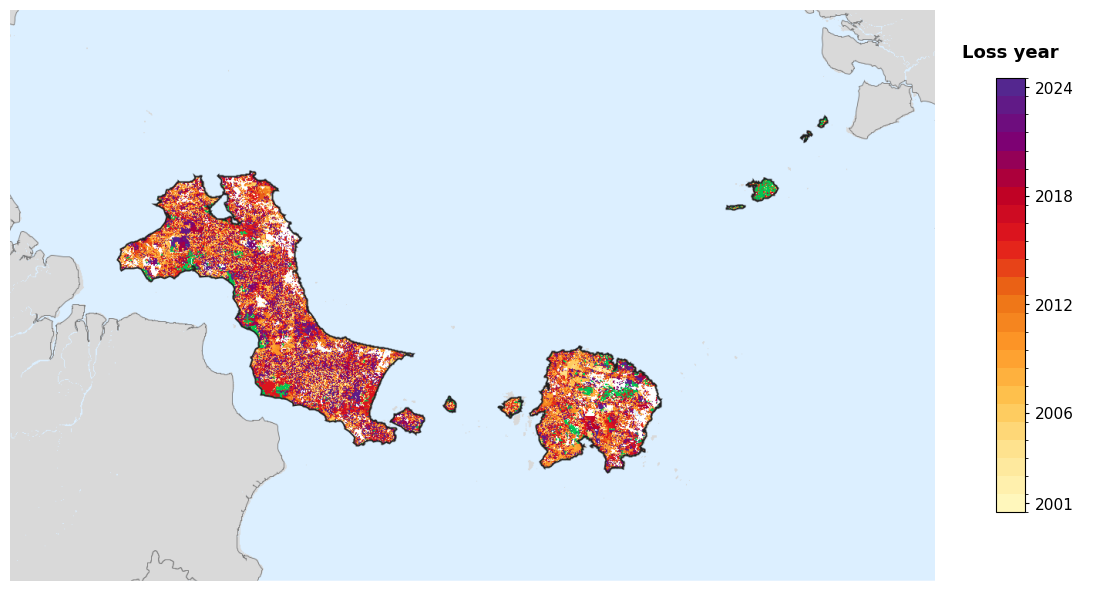
Tree-cover loss year in Bangka Belitung Islands, 2001-2024, from the Global Forest Change dataset.

Bangka Belitung has various kinds of quality wood that is traded outside the region, such as pelawan, meranti, ramin, mambalong, mandaru, bulin and kerengas. Other forest plants found in the island are keramunting, buk-buk, mate ayem, kapuk, jelutung, pulai, gelam, meranti rawa, mentagor, mahang, various species of mangrove, and others. Other forest products are natural honey and rattan. Bangka Belitung is also known for its bitter honey. Fauna in Bangka Belitung have more common similarities with the fauna in the Riau Archipelago and Peninsular Malaysia than with Sumatra. Some of the animals that can be found in Bangka Belitung are deer, wild boar, beruk, eagle, weasel, and hare, among others.

== Economy ==
In 2007, GDP at current prices in Bangka Belitung province with oil and gas amounted to 17,895,017 million, while the GDP without oil and gas amounted to 17,369,399 million. When compared with the previous year showed an increase where in 2006 the GDP at current prices with the oil and gas is 15,920,529 million and the GDP without oil and gas amounted to 15,299,647 million. Likewise, GDP at constant 2000 prices, either with or without oil and gas in 2007 showed an increase. The rate of economic growth in Bangka Belitung province in 2007 has improved compared to 2006. Based on the calculation of GDP at constant 2000 prices, the economic growth rate in 2007 with oil and gas is about 4.54 percent and non-oil economic growth is around 5.37 percent. The value of GDP at 2000 constant prices in 2006 with oil and gas is 9,053,906 million in 2007 increased to 9,645,062 million, while without the oil and gas into 9,257,539 million.

The economy in Bangka Belitung Province in 2007 is supported by the primary sector and secondary sector. The primary sector includes agriculture and mining and quarrying. The primary sector has a considerable contribution each by 18.67 percent and 20.40 percent. While in the secondary sector, namely the manufacturing sector provides a sizeable contribution in the GDP Bangka Belitung province that is equal to 22.51 per cent and for electricity, gas and water supply and construction sectors each contributed 0.65 percent and 5,87 percent. For the tertiary sector is trade, hotel and restaurant sector, transport and communications, financial services, leasing and business services sector and the services sector has accounted for 34.81 percent. In terms of the use of GDP at current prices is used for household consumption. In 2007 the amount of household consumption expenditure amounted to 9,015,057 million or about 50.38 percent of total GDP. Besides foreign trade activities also have a substantial contribution to exports worth 8,741,217 million or 48.84 percent and for imports were valued at 5,284,414 million or 29.53 percent of total GDP.

The balance of trade which include exports and imports of Bangka Belitung province in 2007 increased the value of the surplus from the previous year. The value of exports in 2007 reached 1254.43 million US dollars, up 17.38 percent over the previous year. While the value of imports declined from 25.09 million US dollars in 2006 to 21.58 million in 2007 or a decrease of 16.27 percent. The amount of trade surplus in 2007 amounted to 1232.85 million US dollars. Thus the surplus value in 2007 increased by 18.13 percent.

=== Industry ===
In 2007, Bangka Belitung province was dominated by the chemical industry and building materials in quantity, with as many as 1,187 business units spread across the districts and cities, mostly in Central Bangka Regency with 339 business units. Employment in the industrial sector reached 19,462 people where 7,375 were in the largest employment group of metal machinery and electronics industry. The handicraft industry in the Bangka Belitung Islands is a result of agricultural processing industry, fishery, agriculture and marine products. Industrial craft cultivated population are hand crafted pewter industry in the form of tin, bracelets, rings, and sticks from the root bahar, woven caps, traditional caps and so on. While the craft industry in the form of food and confectionery in the form of paste, rusip, brittle, crackers, and others.

== Health ==
According to the Indonesian Health Department, Bangka Belitung is highly malarious area, with an annual malaria incidence rate of 29.3/1000 population.

== Government and administrative divisions ==
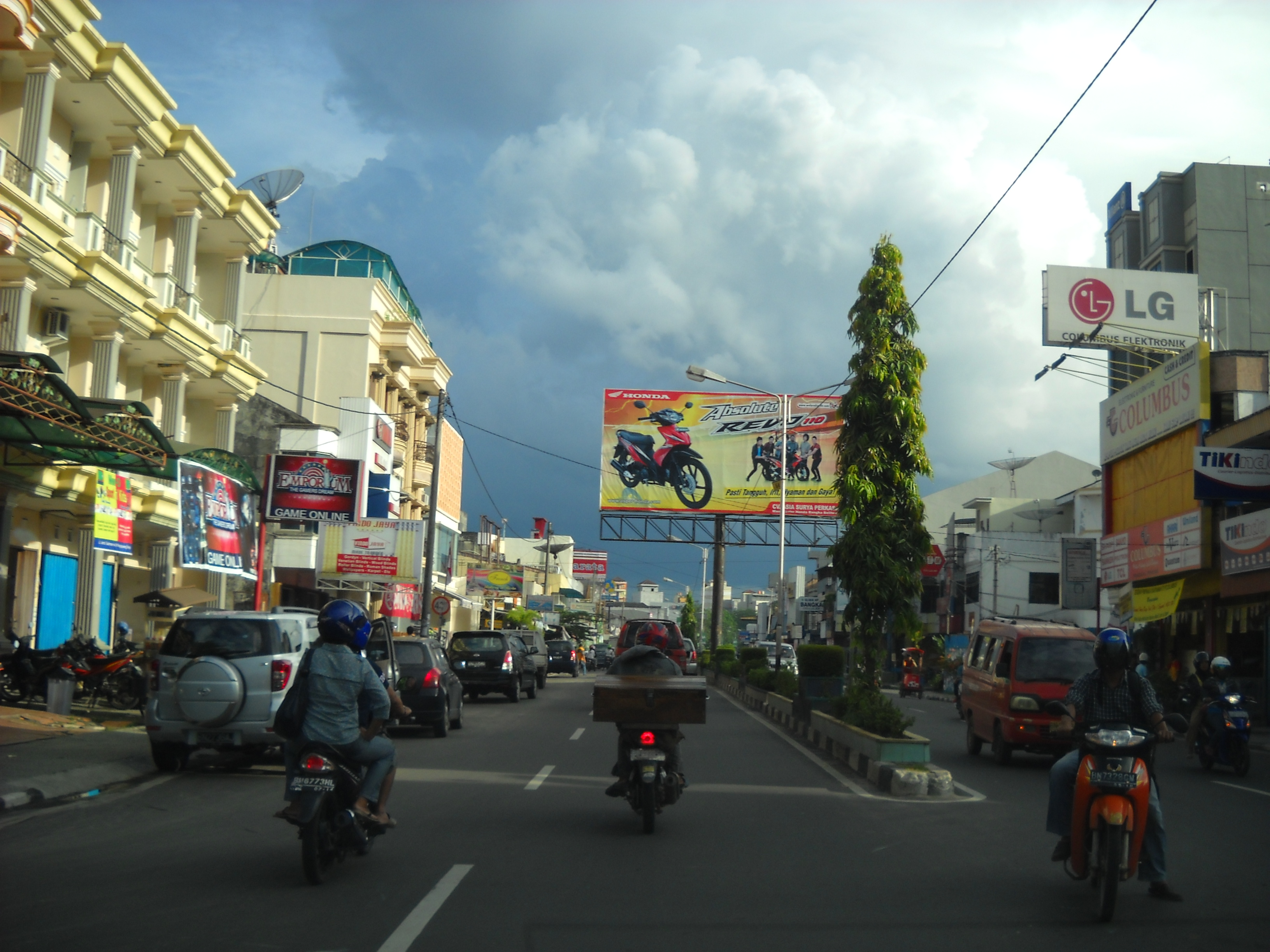
Pangkalpinang, the capital city as well as the largest city in the province.

When formed in December 2000, the new province of Kepulauan Bangka Belitung was composed of just two regencies (Bangka Regency and Belitung Regency) together with one independent city (Pangkalpinang). On 25 February 2003, three quarters (74.3% of the area) of Bangka Regency was split off to form the separate regencies of West Bangka (Bangka Barat), Central Bangka (Bangka Tengah) and South Bangka (Bangka Selatan), while the eastern half of Belitung Regency was split off to form a new East Belitung (Belitung Timur) regency. These are all listed below with their areas and their populations according to the 2010 Census and the 2020 Census, together with the official estimates as of mid 2025.

Kode Wilayah	Name of City or Regency	Area in km^{2}	Pop'on Census 2010	Pop'n Census 2020	Pop'n Estimate mid 2025	Capital	HDI 2021 Estimates
19.01	Bangka Regency	3,016.85	277,204	326,265	341,760	Sungailiat	0.725 (High)
19.04	Central Bangka Regency (Bangka Tengah)	2,259.98	161,228	198,946	211,989	Koba	0.709 (High)
19.03	South Bangka Regency (Bangka Selatan)	3,607.08	172,528	198,189	219,904	Toboali	0.670 (Medium)
19.05	West Bangka Regency (Bangka Barat)	2,853.41	175,150	204,612	220,242	Mentok	0.696 (Medium)
19.71	Pangkalpinang City	104.54	174,758	218,569	233,466	Pangkalpinang	0.786 (High)
	Total Bangka	11,841.86	960,868	1,146,581	1,227,361		
19.02	Belitung Regency	2,269.36	155,965	182,079	194,392	Tanjungpandan	0.726 (High)
19.06	East Belitung Regency (Belitung Timur)	2,506.91	106,463	127,018	133,443	Manggar	0.714 (High)
	Total Belitung	4,776.27	262,428	309,097	327,835		
	Total Province	16,618.13	1,223,396	1,455,678	1,555,196		

The province forms one of Indonesia's 84 national electoral districts to elect members to the People's Representative Council. The Bangka Belitung Islands Electoral District consists of all of the 6 regencies in the province, together with the city of Pangkalpinang, and elects 3 members to the People's Representative Council.

== Tourism ==
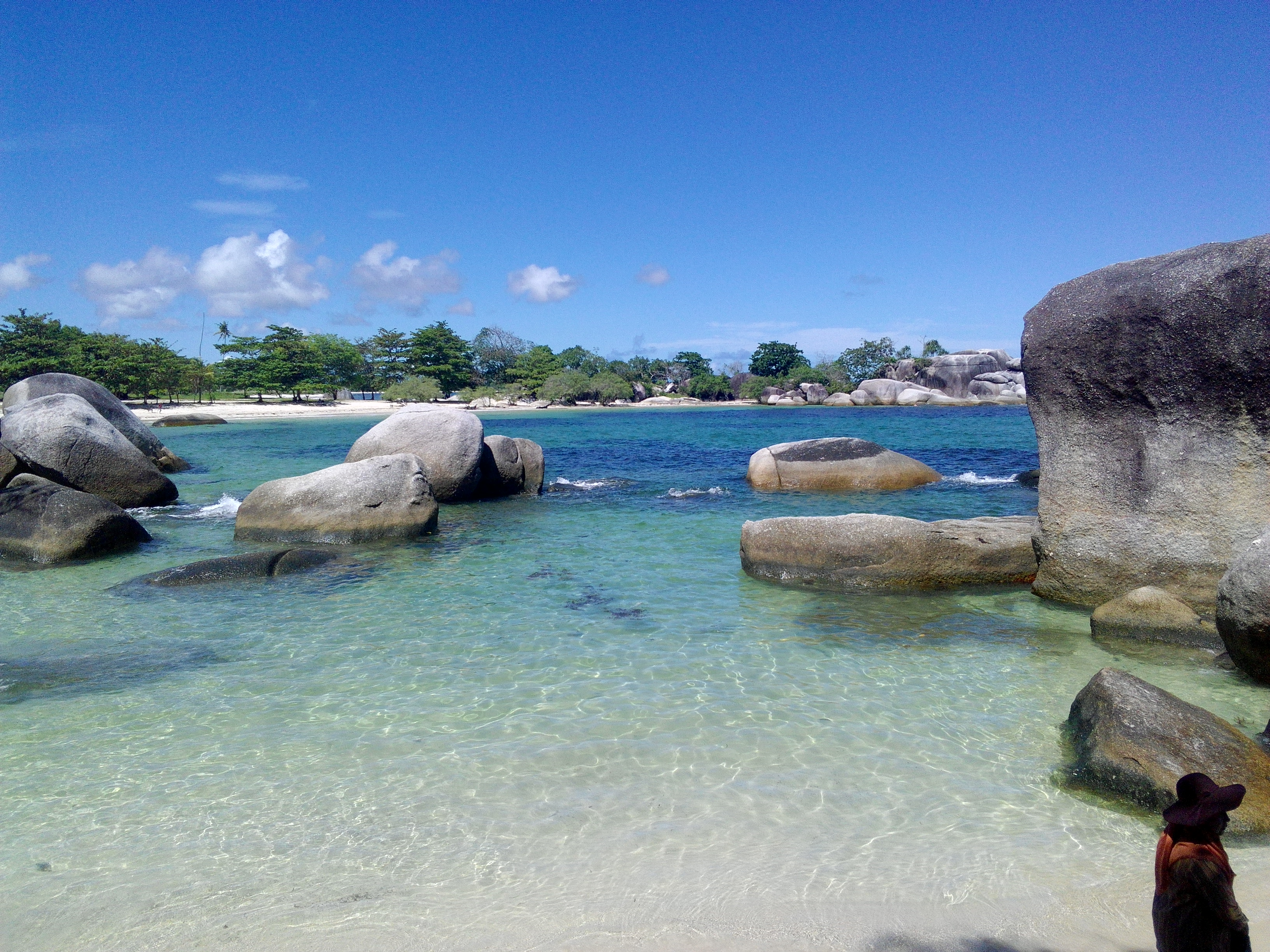
Tanjung Tinggi Beach. Bangka Belitung has significant areas of open sea and islands.

Bangka Belitung has numerous beaches and several small islands. Some beaches are famous for their natural attractiveness with blue sea waters, variety of coral reefs, white sand, and giant granite rock formations. Thus, Bangka Belitung beaches have attracted tourists from around the world. Some of the well-known beaches in Bangka Island are Pasir Padi, Matras, Parai Tenggiri, Tanjung Pesona, Rambak, Teluk Limau, Teluk Uber, Tanjung Penyusuk, Tanjung Kalian and Tanjung Kerasak.

Some of the beaches in Belitung Island are Tanjung Kiras, Tanjung Pendam, Tanjung Tinggi, Tanjung Kelayang Beach, Tanjung Binga, Panyaeran Beach, Tanjung Kubu, Teluk Gembira, and Tanjung Ru Beach. Most of the beaches in Belitung features the sites for diving, scuba, snorkeling, fishing and sailing.

== Demographics ==
Historical population
Year	Pop.	±%
1971	507,231	—
1980	653,897	+28.9%
1990	822,900	+25.8%
2000	900,197	+9.4%
2005	1,042,828	+15.8%
2010	1,223,296	+17.3%
2015	1,372,813	+12.2%
2020	1,455,678	+6.0%
2024	1,531,530	+5.2%
Source: Statistics Indonesia 2024 and previous. Bangka Belitung was part of South Sumatra Province until 2000.

The population of Bangka Belitung Province in 2010 amounted to 1,223,296 inhabitants, showing a 36.06 percent increase from the 2000 Population Census. The population increased to 1,455,678 at the 2020 Census, and the official estimate in mid 2024 was 1,531,530. The local Malay who lived in the province are locally called "Melayu Bangka & Melayu Belitung".

The male population in 2020 was 749,548 and the female population was 706,130; the official estimate as at mid 2023 was 1,531,530 (comprising 786,010 males and 745,520 females). The sex ratio of the same year thus amounted to 105.43, meaning that on average in 2023 for every 411 residents in Bangka Belitung there were 200 women and 211 men. The annual population growth rate in Bangka Belitung province in the decade from 2010 amounted to 1.70 percent (compared with 3.13% in the preceding decade), but in the four years from 2020 onwards this has averaged 1.36% per year. If the growth was reviewed by district / city for the period 2010-2020, the average annual growth rate was highest in the City of Pangkalpinang at 2.19 percent, followed by 2.06 percent in the Central Bangka Regency. The number of households in Bangka Belitung in 2010 about 311 145 households and counties that have the largest number of households is Bangka amounted to 70,468 households and who have the lowest number of households is East Belitung amounted to 27,941 households.

The population density Bangka Belitung province in 2024 reached 91.76 people per km^{2}; when seen by district / city, Pangkalpinang had the highest density of 2,204 people per km^{2} and East Belitung District had the lowest density of 51 people per km^{2}.

=== Ethnicity ===
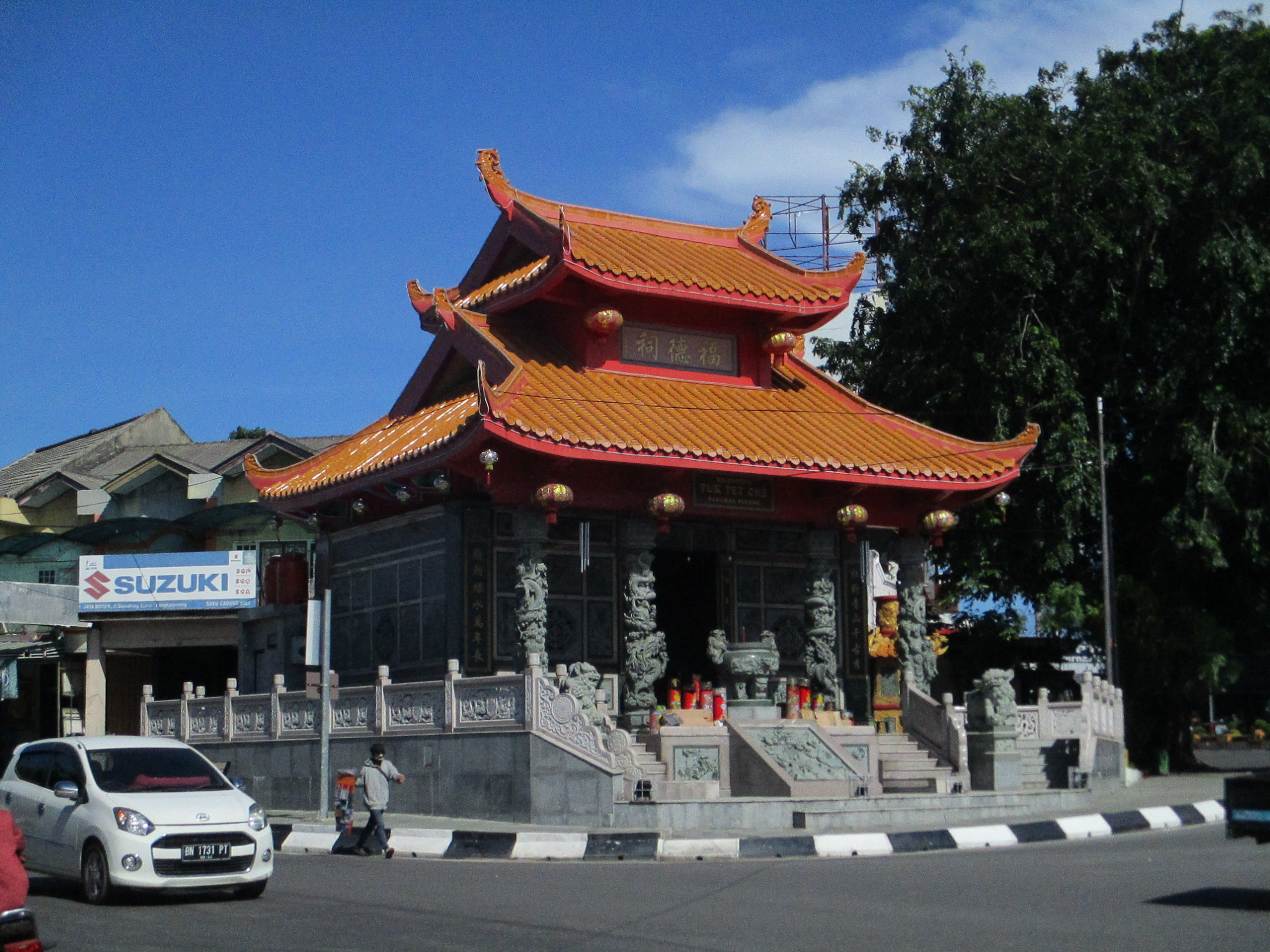
A Taoist temple in Pangkalpinang

Bangka Island and Belitung Island were originally inhabited by the Orang Laut or sea people. The Orang Laut themselves came from various islands. Sea people from Belitung sailed and inhabited the coast along the Malay Peninsula, then returned to Bangka Island and Belitung Island, while those who lived in the Riau Islands sailed to Bangka. There are also groups of Orang Laut from Sulawesi and Kalimantan. In the next wave, the Bugis, who were originally from South Sulawesi, came and settled in Bangka, Belitung and Riau. Then came the Johor Malay, Siantan Malay, Malay-Chinese, and also native Chinese, mingling during the process of acculturation and culture. Finally came the Minangkabau, Javanese, Banjarese, Madurese, Acehnese and some other ethnic groups.

The Malay is the largest ethnic group in the province. They form around 52.5% of the total population. The Malays are mostly concentrated around the interior of Bangka and Belitung. The Malay are divided into the Bangka Malay and the Belitung Malay. These 2 group are slightly different ranging from their culture to their language. Most of the Malays works in either the farming industry or the fishing industry. The Malay in Bangka Belitung have a very distinct lifestyle compared to other Malay people, especially with those in Malaysia.

The second largest ethnic group is the Chinese, forming around 29.1% of the total population. The Chinese are mostly concentrated in the coastal part of Bangka and Belitung or urban areas. The Chinese in Bangka Belitung were originally from Southern China, especially from Guangdong, migrating from the 18th century to the early 20th century to have better job opportunities. During the colonial era, most of the Chinese worked in the mining industry as well as making their own businesses. Most of the Chinese in Bangka Belitung are Hakka, while significant Hokkien and Cantonese communities also exist. The Chinese culture in Bangka is slightly different from the Chinese in Belitung. The Chinese in Bangka were imported in the early 18th century when the mine was officially opened. They generally did not bring their wives and thus married indigenous people, so the Chinese in Bangka are mostly peranakans who speak the Hakka Language mixed with Malay. Belitung Chinese are considered "totok" ("full-blooded") because when they came in the 19th century they brought their wives. They adapted to the culture of the archipelago, among others, by changing their clothing into local clothing such as clothes with kebaya kurung or sarong. They still speak with the original Hakka language spoken in China today.

The rest of the population consist of immigrants from other parts of Indonesia such as the Javanese, Minangkabau and the Bugis.

=== Religion ===
Religion in Bangka Belitung (2022)
1. Islam (90.2%)
2. Buddhism (4.22%)
3. Protestantism (2.10%)
4. Confucianism (2.00%)
5. Catholicism (1.29%)
6. Folk/Other (0.07%)
7. Hinduism (0.08%)

Based on the Population Census in 2015, the percentage of religion in Bangka Belitung is Muslim 88.71%, Buddhist 4.49%, Christianity 3.37% (Protestant 2.06% and Roman Catholic 1.31%), Confucian 3.30% and Hindu 0.09%.

Bangka Belitung has 730 mosques, 87 Protestant churches, 30 Catholic churches and 48 monasteries. Number of pilgrims registered and departed to Mecca in 2007 as many as 1012 pilgrims.

=== Employment ===
The population of Bangka Belitung Islands aged 15 years and above or which includes the Working Age Population (PUK) in 2007 as many as 766,428 people or 69.25 percent of the total population. 66.78 percent of the PUK is included in the workforce population (working and / or seeking employment) and the remaining 33.72 percent are non-workforce residents (schools, taking care of households and others). The labor force participation rate of Bangka Belitung Islands in 2007 amounted to 66.28 percent meaning that 66 percent of the working age population is economically active. The open unemployment rate for the Bangka Belitung Islands in the same year amounted to 6.49 percent, meaning that out of 100 people including the labor force, on average 5-6 people are job seekers. The working age population when viewed from the employment sector shows that as much as 34.4 percent of the working age working population is absorbed in the agricultural sector, 20.9 percent is absorbed by the mining sector and the trade sector absorbs 18.7 percent.

== Education ==
The history of universities in Bangka Belitung was initiated by the inauguration of Sriwijaya Bangka Bangka University in 1970s. But in accordance with the regulations that did not allow state universities to open branches, the university was closed in the early 1980s. Those educators in Bangka Island who cared about the importance of higher education then initiated the presence of universities in Bangka by forming the Foundation of Education Bangka (Yapertiba), which later in 1982 founded STIH Pertiba with the Department of Law and STIE Pertiba with Management majors located in Pangkalpinang City. Yapertiba also established STAI Bangka located in Sungailiat City. PT. Timah Tbk. participated in developing the world of higher education by establishing the Polytechnic of Tin Manufacturing in 1994, located in Sungailiat City which has 3 majors. In the 1990s, Pangkalpinang City Government took part in establishing the Nursing Academy to produce reliable health workers in accordance with the needs of the region located in Pangkalpinang District Hospital. Yapertiba in 1999 established STIPER Bangka located in Sungailiat City in 1999, then STIPER Bangka in 2006 merged into part of University of Bangka Belitung. In 1999 also stands Bakti Accounting Academy founded by Yayasan Pendidikan Bakti.

In Belitung Island a number of educational observers in 1999 established the Belitung Management Academy. STIE IBEK Babel was also present to enliven the world of higher education in Bangka which was established in 2000 located in Pangkalpinang City with majoring in Accounting and Management. In 2001 AMIK Atma Luhur stood in Pangkalpinang City with a specialty in informatics expertise, has 2 majors namely Management Informatics and Computer Accounting. In the same year STIKES Abdi Nusa was also present at Pangkalpinang with Public Health department. In 2003 the Stisipol Pahlawan 12 and TT Pahlawan 12 were established in Sungailiat City. The Ministry of Religious Affairs in 2005 established STAIN Syekh Abdurrahman Sidik located in West Mendo District. In 2006 stood the first university in Bangka Belitung namely University of Bangka Belitung (UBB) which was the forerunner to the establishment of a state university in Bangka Belitung. UBB is a merger of 3 universities namely Polman Timah, STIPER Bangka and STT Heroes 12. In February 2009 UBB officially became a state university with the signing of MoU submission of all UBB assets from Yayasan Cendikia Bangka to Dirjen Dikti Depdiknas.

== See also ==
- List of people from the Bangka Belitung Islands
