= List of Chinese diaspora people =

This is a list of Overseas Chinese.

== Leaders and politicians ==
=== Head of States & Governments ===
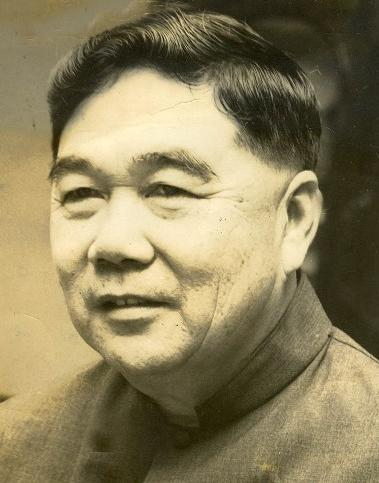
Guyana President Arthur Chung was the first ethnic Chinese President of Guyana

- Arthur Chung: President of Guyana
- Abdullah Ahmad Badawi: Prime Minister of Malaysia
- Abdurrahman Wahid, 4th President of Indonesia
- Abhisit Vejjajiva: Prime Minister of Thailand
- Anand Panyarachun, Prime Minister of Thailand
- Anote Tong, President of Kiribati
- Anutin Charnvirakul, Prime Minister of Thailand
- Banharn Silpa-Archa: Prime Minister of Thailand
- Benigno Aquino III, President of the Philippines
- Bongbong Marcos, President of the Philippines
- Chan Sy, Prime Minister of Cambodia
- Chatichai Choonhavan, Prime Minister of Thailand
- Chavalit Yongchaiyudh, Prime Minister of Thailand
- Chea Sim, President of Cambodia
- Cheng Heng, President of Cambodia
- Chuan Leekpai, Prime Minister of Thailand
- Corazon Aquino, former president, Philippines
- Dési Bouterse, President of Suriname
- Emilio Aguinaldo, 1st President of the Philippines
- George Maxwell Richards, President of Trinidad and Tobago
- Goh Chok Tong, Prime Minister of Singapore
- Henk Chin A Sen, Premier of Suriname
- Hun Manet, Prime Minister of Cambodia
- Hun Sen, Prime Minister of Cambodia
- James Mancham, President of Seychelles
- Julius Chan, Prime Minister of Papua New Guinea
- Khieu Samphan, Head of State of Kampuchea
- Khin Nyunt, Prime Minister of Myanmar
- Kriangsak Chamanan, Prime Minister of Thailand
- Lawrence Wong: Prime Minister of Singapore
- Lee Hsien Loong: Prime Minister of Singapore
- Lee Kuan Yew: 1st Prime Minister of Singapore
- Lon Nol, President of Cambodia
- Luis Guillermo Solís, President of Costa Rica
- Luo Fangbo, President of the Lanfang Republic
- Manuel L. Quezon, President of the Philippines
- Ne Win, President of Burma, Myanmar
- Ong Teng Cheong, 5th President of Singapore
- Paetongtarn Shinawatra, Prime Minister of Thailand
- Pedro Paterno, Prime Minister of the Philippines
- Phraya Manopakorn Nitithada, Prime Minister of Thailand
- Phraya Phahonphonphayuhasena, Prime Minister of Thailand
- Plaek Phinbunsongkhram, Prime Minister of Thailand
- Pol Pot, Prime Minister of Cambodia
- Pote Sarasin, Prime Minister of Thailand
- Rodrigo Duterte, President of the Philippines
- Roh Moo-hyun, President of Korea
- Roh Tae-woo: President of Korea
- Samak Sundaravej, Prime Minister of Thailand
- San Yu, President of Myanmar
- Sarit Thanarat, Prime Minister of Thailand
- Seni Pramoj, Prime Minister of Thailand
- Sergio Osmeña, President of the Philippines
- Somchai Wongsawat, Prime Minister of Thailand
- Son Ngoc Thanh, Prime Minister of Cambodia
- Srettha Thavisin, Prime Minister of Thailand
- Stuart Young, Prime Minister-designate of Trinidad and Tobago
- Suchinda Kraprayoon, Prime Minister of Thailand
- Thaksin Shinawatra, Prime Minister of Thailand
- Thawan Thamrongnawasawat, Prime Minister of Thailand
- Tony Tan, 7th President of Singapore
- Wee Kim Wee, 4th President of Singapore
- Yingluck Shinawatra, Prime Minister of Thailand

=== Chief ministers ===
- Chong Kah Kiat, Chief Minister of Sabah
- Chow Kon Yeow, Chief Minister of Penang
- Koh Tsu Koon, Chief Minister of Penang
- Lim Chong Eu, Chief Minister of Penang
- Peter Lo Su Yin, Chief Minister of Sabah
- Wong Pow Nee, Chief Minister of Penang
- Yong Teck Lee, Chief Minister of Sabah

=== Governors ===
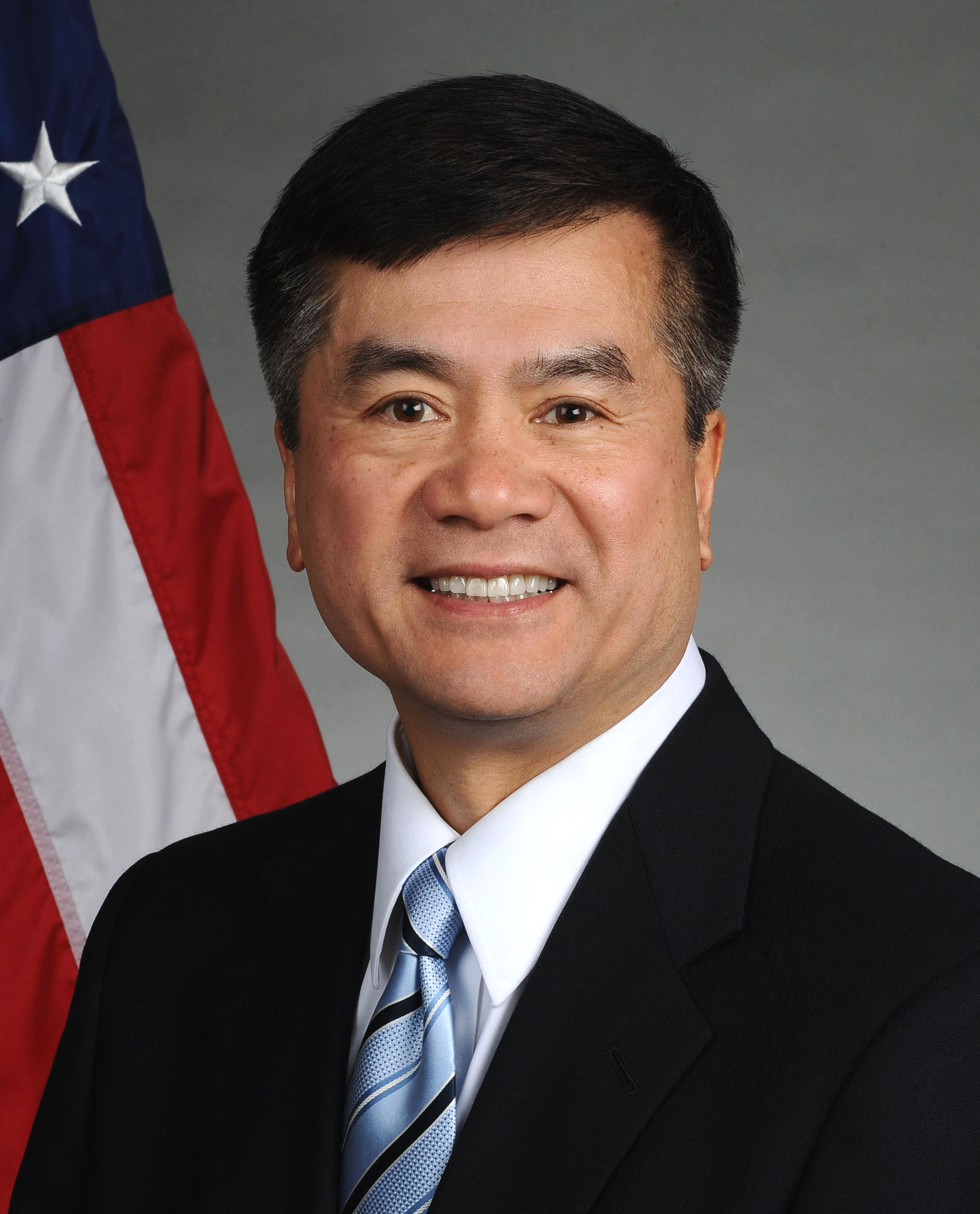
Gary Locke was Governor of Washington, a large state of the U.S.

- Solomon Hochoy: 17th Governor of Trinidad and Tobago
- Abdusakur Mahail Tan, Governor of Sulu Province, Philippines
- Adrienne Clarkson: Governor General of Canada
- Apirak Kosayodhin: Governor of Bangkok, Thailand
- Arthur C. Yap, Governor of Bohol, Philippines
- Basuki Tjahaja Purnama, Governor of Jakarta, Indonesia
- Bhichai Rattakul: Governor of Bangkok, Thailand
- Gary Locke: Governor of Washington
- Henk Ngantung, Governor of Jakarta, Indonesia
- Hidayat Arsani, Governor of Bangka Belitung, Indonesia
- Hok Lundy, Governor of Phnom Penh, Cambodia
- Koh Tsu Koon, Chief Minister of Penang, Malaysia
- Leong Yew Koh, first Malacca Governor, Malaysia
- Lim Chong Eu, Chief Minister of Penang, Malaysia
- Lim Guan Eng, Chief Minister of Penang, Malaysia
- Lim Yew Hock, Chief Minister of Singapore
- Nam Kyung-pil, Governor of Gyeonggi, South Korea
- Ria Norsan, Governor of West Kalimantan, Indonesia
- Sherly Tjoanda, Governor of North Maluku, Indonesia

=== Mayors ===
- Alan Lowe: Mayor of Victoria
- Alice Guo, Mayor of Bamban
- Allan Fung: Mayor of Cranston
- Andrei Angouw: Mayor of Manado
- Bodewin Wattimena, Mayor of Ambon, Maluku
- Christian Widodo, Mayor of Kupang
- Ed Lee, Mayor of San Francisco
- Je Jong-geel, Mayor of Ansan, South Korea
- Jean Quan, Mayor of Oakland, California
- Jimmie R. Yee: Mayor of Sacramento
- John So, Lord Mayor of Melbourne
- Hanny Sondakh, Mayor of Bitung, Indonesia
- Harry Chan: Mayor of Darwin
- Hasan Karman, Mayor of Singkawang, Indonesia
- Hazel Chu, Lord Mayor of Dublin, Ireland 2020-2021 and deputy leader of the Green Party of Ireland 2026-present
- Hengky Honandar, Mayor of Bitung, Indonesia
- Herbert Bautista, Mayor of Quezon City, Philippines
- John So: Mayor of Melbourne
- Karen Goh, Mayor of Bakersfield
- Ken Sim: Mayor of Vancouver
- Lily Mei, Mayor of Fremont
- Lily Wu, Mayor of Wichita
- Lito Atienza, Mayor of Manila, Philippines
- Lucy Torres-Gomez, Mayor of Ormoc, Philippines
- Meng Foon, Mayor of Gisborne, New Zealand
- Michelle Wu, Mayor of Boston, United States
- Mihhail Kõlvart, Mayor of Tallinn, Estonia
- Mike Gin: Mayor of Redondo Beach
- Mochammad Anton: Mayor of Malang
- Olivia Chow: Mayor of Toronto
- Peter Chin, Mayor of Dunedin, New Zealand
- Peter Wing: Mayor of Kamloops
- Peter Wong: Mayor of Sudbury
- Roy Ho Ten Soeng, Mayor of Venhuizen, North Holland, Netherlands
- Tjhai Chui Mie, Mayor of Singkawang, Indonesia
- Yiaway Yeh, Mayor of Palo Alto, California

=== Cabinet-level Ministers ===
- Alberto Lim, Secretary of Tourism, Philippines
- Amir Syamsuddin, Minister of Law and Human Rights, Indonesia
- Amy Khor, Senior Minister of State for Transport, Singapore
- Angela Tanoesoedibjo, Vice Minister of Tourism and Creative Economy, Indonesia
- Anthony Loke, Minister of Transport, Malaysia
- Baey Yam Keng, Senior Parliament Secretary, Singapore
- Bob Hasan, Minister of Forestry, Indonesia
- Byron Chan, Minister for Mining, Papua New Guinea
- Chan Chun Sing, Minister for Education, Singapore
- Cham Prasidh, Minister of Commerce, Cambodia
- Chee Hong Tat, Minister for Transport, Singapore
- Chitchai Wannasathit, Minister of Justice, Thailand
- Choo Byung-jik, Minister for Construction, South Korea
- Chris Lu, United States Deputy Secretary of Labor, United States
- Chua Soi Lek, Minister of Health, Malaysia
- David Neo, acting Minister of Culture, Community and Youth, Singapore
- Desmond Lee, Minister for National Development, Singapore
- Do Jong-hwan, Minister of Culture, Sports and Tourism, South Korea
- Edwin Tong, Minister for Culture, Community and Youth, Singapore
- Elaine Chao, United States Secretary of Transportation, United States
- Enggartiasto Lukita, Minister of Trade, Indonesia
- Erick Thohir, Ministry of Youth and Sports, Indonesia
- Faaolesa Katopau Ainuu, Minister of Justice, Samoa
- Gan Kim Yong, Deputy Prime Minister of Singapore, Minister for Trade and Industry, Singapore
- Gan Siow Huang, Minister of State for Education, Singapore
- George Yeo, Minister of Foreign Affairs, Singapore
- Gilbert Teodoro, Secretary of National Defense, Philippines
- Goh Keng Swee, Deputy Prime Minister, Minister for Education, Minister of Defense, Singapore
- Grace Fu, Minister of Sustainability and the Environment, Singapore
- H. S. Lee, Minister of Finance, Malaysia
- Hannah Yeoh, Minister of Youth and Sports, Malaysia
- Heng Swee Keat, Minister of Finance, Singapore
- Hor Namhong, Deputy Prime Minister and Ministry of Foreign Affairs and International Cooperation, Cambodia
- Ignasius Jonan, Minister of Energy and Mineral Resources, Indonesia
- Indranee Rajah, Minister in the Prime Minister's Office, Singapore
- Irene Umar, Deputy Minister of Creative Economy, Indonesia
- Jeffrey Siow, acting Minister of Transport, Singapore
- Jaime Ongpin, Secretary of Finance, Philippines
- José Yulo, Secretary of Justice, Philippines
- Josephine Teo, Minister for Communications and Information, Singapore
- Julie Su, United States Secretary of Labor, United States
- Kalaya Sophonpanich, Minister of Science and Technology, Thailand
- Katherine Tai, United States Trade Representative, United States
- Kong Cho Ha, Minister for Transport, Malaysia
- Khaw Boon Wan, Minister of Infrastructure, Singapore
- Kwik Kian Gie, Coordinating Minister of Economics and Finance, Indonesia
- Lie Kiat Teng, Minister of Health, Indonesia
- Lim Guan Eng, Minister of Finance, Malaysia
- Ling Liong Sik, Minister of Transport, Malaysia
- Lucrecia Hernández Mack, Minister of Public Health and Social Assistance, Guatemala
- Mah Siew Keong, Minister of Plantation Industries and Commodities, Malaysia
- Manuel Yan, Secretary of Foreign Affairs, Philippines
- Mari Elka Pangestu, Minister of Tourism and Creative Economy, Indonesia
- Maszlee Malik, Minister of Education, Malaysia
- Miguel Ángel Osorio Chong, Secretary of the Interior, Mexico
- Ng Chee Meng, Minister of Education, Singapore
- Ng Eng Hen, Minister of Defense, Singapore
- Ng Yen Yen, Minister of Tourism, Arts and Culture, Malaysia
- Nga Kor Ming, Minister of Housing and Local Government, Malaysia
- Oei Tjoe Tat, Minister of State, Indonesia
- Ong Eng Die, Minister of Finance, Indonesia
- Ong Eng Guan, Minister for National Development, Singapore
- Ong Ye Kung, Minister for Health, Singapore
- Pansy Wong, Minister of Ethnic Affairs, New Zealand
- Penny Wong, Senator, Minister for Foreign Affairs, Australia
- Peter Chin Fah Kui, Minister of Energy, Green Technology and Water, Malaysia
- Quinim Pholsena, Foreign Minister, Kingdom of Laos
- Raul Roco, Secretary of Education, Philippines
- Raymond Chan, Minister of State, Canada
- Richard Hu, Minister of Finance, Singapore
- Roland Eng, Minister of Tourism, Cambodia
- Siauw Giok Tjhan, Minister of State, Indonesia
- Song Young-moo, Minister of Defense, South Korea
- Steven Chu, United States Secretary of Energy, United States
- Sun Xueling, Minister of State, Singapore
- Surya Tjandra, Vice Minister of Agrarian Affairs and Spatial Planning, Indonesia
- Suy Sem, Minister of Mines and Energy, Cambodia
- Stella Christie, Deputy Minister of Higher Education, Science, and Technology, Indonesia
- Tan Po Goan, Minister of State, Indonesia
- Tan See Leng, Minister for Manpower, Singapore
- Tan Siew Sin, Minister of Finance, Malaysia
- Tapunuu Niko Lee Hang, Minister of Works Transport and Infrastructure, Samoa
- Tea Banh, Ministry of National Defence, Cambodia
- Teo Chee Han, Senior Minister, Singapore
- Teo Nie Ching, Deputy Minister of Communications, Malaysia
- Thomas Trikasih Lembong, former Minister of Trade, Indonesia
- Tiong King Sing, Minister of Tourism, Arts and Culture, Malaysia
- Trân Vǎn Lǎm, Minister of Foreign Affairs, South Vietnam
- Varawut Silpa-archa, Minister of Social Development and Human Security, Thailand
- Veronica Tan, Deputy Minister of Woman Empowerment and Child Protection, Indonesia
- Vivian Balakrishnan, Minister for Foreign Affairs, Singapore
- Wee Ka Siong, Minister of Transport, Malaysia
- William Chong Wong, Minister of Finance, Honduras
- Yeo Bee Yin, Minister of Energy, Science, Technology, Environment and Climate Change, Malaysia

=== Other Politicians ===
==== Asia ====
- Abraham Tolentino, Deputy Speaker of the House of Representatives, Philippines
- Abun Ediyanto, Deputy Regent of Sekandau, Indonesia
- Acep Purnama, Regent of Kuningan, Indonesia
- Agus Tantomo, Deputy Regent of Berau, Indonesia
- Agustina "Tina Toon" Hermanto, politician and singer, Indonesia
- Alex Indra Lukman, politician, Indonesia
- Alex Yam, politician, Singapore
- Alfredo Lim, politician, Philippines
- Alice Lau, Deputy Speaker of the Dewan Rakyat, Malaysia
- Alvin Lie Ling Piao, politician, Indonesia
- Andre Low, politician, Singapore
- Ang Hin Kee, politician, Singapore
- Ang Mong Seng, politician, Singapore
- Ang Wei Neng, politician, Singapore
- Ang Yong Guan, politician, Singapore
- Anuar Tan Abdullah, politician, Malaysia
- Arfiya Eri, politician, Japan
- Arnold Atienza, politician, Philippines
- Arthur Fong, politician, Singapore
- Arthur Yap, politician, Philippines
- Bahar Buasan, politician, Indonesia
- Bai Xuoqian, politician, Myanmar
- Bam Aquino, politician, Philippines
- Ban Ki-moon, Secretary General of the United Nations, South Korea
- Basuri Tjahaja Purnama, Regent of East Belitung, Indonesia
- Benjamin Pwee, politician, Singapore
- Benny Alexander Litelnoni, Vice Governor of East Nusa Tenggara, Indonesia
- Benny Laos, Regent of Morotai, Indonesia
- Bobby Jayanto, politician, Indonesia
- Bong Go, politician, Philippines
- Bong Kee Chok, activist, Malaysia
- Boo Cheng Hau, politician, Malaysia
- Bong Ming Ming, Deputy Mayor of West Bangka, Indonesia
- Brilian Moktar, politician, Indonesia
- Budhi Sarwono, Regent of Banjarnegara, Indonesia
- Budhi Setiawan, Deputy Regent of Banyumas, Indonesia
- Cai Yinzhou, politician, Singapore
- Calvin Chong Ket Kiun, politician, Malaysia
- Carrie Tan, politician, Singapore
- Cassandra Lee, politician, Singapore
- Cen Sui Lan, Regent of Natuna Islands, Indonesia
- Cha Kee Chin, politician, Malaysia
- Chai Chong Yii, politician, Singapore
- Chan Choy Siong, politician and women's rights activist, Singapore
- Chan Ming Kai, politician, Malaysia
- Chang Lih Kang, politician, Malaysia
- Chang Wendryanto, politician, Indonesia
- Charles Honoris, politician, Indonesia
- Charles Yeo, politician, Singapore
- Chee Soon Juan, politician, Singapore
- Cheo Chai Chen, politician, Singapore
- Cheon Ho-sun, politician, South Korea
- Chen Man Hin, politician, Malaysia
- Chen Show Mao, politician, Singapore
- Cheryl Chan, politician, Singapore
- Cheryl Tanzil, politician, Indonesia
- Chia Thye Poh, politician, Singapore
- Chiam See Tong, politician, Singapore
- Chin Peng, politician, Malaysia
- Chin Tet Yung, politician, Singapore
- Chong Chieng Jen, politician, Malaysia
- Chong Eng, politician, Malaysia
- Chong Kee Hiong, politician, Singapore
- Chong Zemin, politician, Malaysia
- Choong Shiau Yoon, politician, Malaysia
- Christiandy Sanjaya, politician, Indonesia
- Christina Liew, politician, Malaysia
- Chua Tian Chang, politician, Malaysia
- Chung Kok Ming, politician, Malaysia
- Chuwit Chitsakul, politician, Thailand
- Cynthia Phua, politician, Singapore
- Daniel Goh, politician, Singapore
- Daniel Johan, politician, Indonesia
- Daniel Wa Wai How, politician, Malaysia
- Darmadi Durianto, politician, Indonesia
- Daud Yordan, boxer and politician, Indonesia
- David Ong, politician, Singapore
- Denise Phua, politician, Singapore
- Dennis Tan, politician, Singapore
- Derrick Goh, politician, Singapore
- Desmond Choo, politician, Singapore
- Desmond Lim, politician, Singapore
- Diana Pang, politician, Singapore
- Dick Gordon, politician, Philippines
- Ding Kuong Hiing, politician, Malaysia
- Dixie Tan, politician, Singapore
- Dominic Lau Hoe Chai, politician, Malaysia
- Don Wee, politician, Singapore
- Edmund Chong Ket Wah, politician, Malaysia
- Edward Chia, politician, Singapore
- Edward Tannur, politician, Indonesia
- Eileen Chong, politician and diplomat, Singapore
- Eliaser Yentji Sunur, Regent of Lembata, Indonesia
- Elizabeth Wong Keat Ping, politician, Malaysia
- Elysa Chen, politician, Singapore
- Eng Chhai Eang, politician, Cambodia
- Er Teck Hwa, politician, Malaysia
- Eric Go Yap, politician, Philippines
- Fan Yew Teng, politician, Malaysia
- Fatimah Abdullah, politician, Malaysia
- Fandi Tjandra, politician, Indonesia
- Fong Chan Onn, politician, Malaysia
- Fong Chong Pik, activist, Singapore
- Fong Kui Lun, politician, Malaysia
- Fong Swee Suan, politician, Singapore
- Foo Mee Har, politician, Singapore
- Francis Yuen, politician, Singapore
- Frankie Gan, politician, Malaysia
- Frankie Poon, politician, Malaysia
- Freddy Thie, Regent of Kaimana, Indonesia
- Gabriel Lam, politician, Singapore
- Gan Peck Cheng, politician, Malaysia
- Gan Thiam Poh, politician, Singapore
- George Hiew Vun Zin, politician, Malaysia
- Gerald Giam, politician, Singapore
- Giles Ji Ungpakorn, activist, Thailand
- Goh Hock Guan, politician, Malaysia
- Goh King Chin, politician, Brunei
- Goh Leong San, politician, Malaysia
- Goh Meng Seng, politician, Singapore
- Grace Natalie, politician, Indonesia
- Hany Soh, politician, Singapore
- Harry Tjan Silalahi, politician, Indonesia
- Hazel Poa, politician, Singapore
- He Ting Ru, politician, Singapore
- Hee Loy Sian, politician, Malaysia
- Hee Yit Foong, politician, Malaysia
- Hendrata Thes, Regent of Sula Islands, Indonesia
- Hendrawan Supratikno, politician, Indonesia
- Henry Kwek, politician, Singapore
- Henry Yosodiningrat, politician, Indonesia
- Herman Hery, politician, Indonesia
- Hermawi Taslim, politician, Indonesia
- Hillary Brigitta Lasut, politician, Indonesia
- Hoh Khai Mun, politician, Malaysia
- Hok Hoei Kan, politician, Indonesia
- Hong Kok Tin, politician, Brunei
- Hou Kok Chung, politician, Malaysia
- Howard Lee Chuan How, politician, Malaysia
- Hu Sepang, politician, Malaysia
- Huan Cheng Guan, politician, Malaysia
- Hwang Soo Jin, politician, Singapore
- Ilham Pangestu, politician, Indonesia
- Imee Marcos, politician, Philippines
- In Jae-keun, politician, South Korea
- Irene Marcos, politician, Philippines
- Irene Ng, politician, Singapore
- Ita Martadinata Haryono, activist, Indonesia
- Ja Song-nam, diplomat, North Korea
- Jamaliah Jamaluddin, politician, Malaysia
- James Wong Kim Min, Leader of the Opposition, Malaysia
- Jamus Lim, politician, Singapore
- Jan Darmadi, member of the Presidential Advisory Council, Indonesia
- Jasmin Lau, politician, Singapore
- Jeannette Chong-Aruldoss, politician, Singapore
- Jeff Ooi, politician, Malaysia
- Jek Yeun Thong, politician, Singapore
- Jermmas Chuenglertsiri, politician, Thailand
- Jesse Robredo, politician and former Secretary of Interior and Local Government, Philippines
- Jessica Tan, Deputy Speaker of Parliament, Singapore
- Jimmy Puah Wee Tse, politician, Malaysia
- Joachim Lopez, Regent of Belu, Indonesia
- Johan Gonga, Regent of Aru Islands, Indonesia
- Joice Triatman, politician, Indonesia
- Jose Cojuangco, politician, Philippines
- Jose Maria Sison, activist, Philippines
- Jose Rizal, National Hero of the Philippines, Philippines
- Joseph Afaratu, politician, Indonesia
- Julian Tan, politician, Malaysia
- Julie Sutrisno, politician, Indonesia
- June Leow, politician, Malaysia
- Justin Wong Yung Bin, politician, Malaysia
- Jusuf Hamka, businessman and politician, Indonesia
- Jusuf Wanandi, politician, Indonesia
- Kathleen Wong, politician, Malaysia
- Kelvin Yii Lee Wuen, politician, Malaysia
- Kenneth Tiong, politician, Singapore
- Kenny Chua Teck Ho, politician, Malaysia
- Ker Sin Tze, politician, Singapore
- Kerk Chee Yee, politician, Malaysia
- Kerk Kim Hock, politician, Malaysia
- Khem Veasna, politician, Cambodia
- Khoe Woen Sioe, politician, Indonesia
- Khoo Poay Tiong, politician, Malaysia
- Ko Chung Sen, politician, Malaysia
- Korn Chatikavanij, politician, Thailand
- Kyi Maung, politician, Myanmar
- Lai Teck, activist, Malaysia
- Larry Sng, politician, Malaysia
- Lau How Teck, politician, Brunei
- Lee Bee Wah, politician, Singapore
- Lee Chean Chung, politician, Malaysia
- Lee Li Lian, politician, Singapore
- Lee Siew Choh, politician, Singapore
- Leong Mun Wai, politician, Singapore
- Liang Teck Meng, politician, Malaysia
- Lie Eng Hok, activist, Indonesia
- Liem Koen Hian, politician, Indonesia
- Liew Chin Tong, politician, Malaysia
- Liew Vui Keong, politician, Malaysia
- Lily Neo, politician, Singapore
- Lim Ban Hong, politician, Malaysia
- Lim Biow Chuan, Deputy Speaker of the Parliament of Singapore, Singapore
- Lim Chin Siong, politician, Singapore
- Lim Chong Eu, politician, Malaysia
- Lim Hui Ying, politician, Malaysia
- Lim Jock Hoi, Secretary General of ASEAN, Brunei
- Lim Kit Siang, Leader of the Opposition, Malaysia
- Lim Lip Eng, politician, Malaysia
- Lim Tean, politician, Singapore
- Linda Tsen, politician, Malaysia
- Ling How Doong, politician, Singapore
- Ling Tian Soon, politician, Malaysia
- Lito Atienza, politician, Philippines
- Loa Sek Hie, politician, Indonesia
- Louis Chua, politician, Singapore
- Louis Ng, politician, Singapore
- Low Thia Khiang, politician, Singapore
- Mak Pak Shee, politician, Singapore
- Manuel Yan, diplomat, Philippines
- Maria Chin Abdullah, politician, Malaysia
- Maria Fernanda Lay, politician, Timor Leste
- Mark Cojuangco, politician, Philippines
- Mary Yap, politician, Malaysia
- Matheos Tan, Regent of Lembata, Indonesia
- Matthias Yao, politician, Singapore
- Me Hoa, politician, Indonesia
- Melki Sedek Huang, activist, Indonesia
- Melvin Yong, politician, Singapore
- Michael Chen, politician, Malaysia
- Michael Teo Yu Keng, politician, Malaysia
- Michael Thungari, Regent of Sangihe, Indonesia
- Michelle Ng, politician, Malaysia
- Milagrosa Tan, politician, Philippines
- Miro Quimbo, politician, Philippines
- Mor Bastiaan, Vice Mayor of Manado, Indonesia
- Mu Sochua, politician, Cambodia
- Namto Hui Roba, Regent of West Halmahera and politician, Indonesia
- Nathaniel Tan, activist, Malaysia
- Neo Yee Pan, politician, Malaysia
- Ng Ling Ling, politician, Singapore
- Ng Shi Xuan, politician, Singapore
- Ngeh Koo Ham, politician, Malaysia
- Nicole Seah, politician, Singapore
- Nikki Coseteng, politician, Philippines
- Oh Joon, diplomat, South Korea
- Oh Se-hoon, Mayor of Seoul, South Korea
- Oh Tong Keong, politician, Malaysia
- Ohn Myint, politician, Myanmar
- Ong Chit Chung, politician, Singapore
- Ong Ka Chuan, politician, Malaysia
- Ong Ka Ting, politician, Malaysia
- Ong Tee Keat, politician, Malaysia
- Ong Tiong Oh, politician, Brunei
- Oscar Ling, politician, Malaysia
- Panfilo Lacson, politician, Philippines
- Pang Hok Liong, politician, Malaysia
- Paolo Duterte, politician, Philippines
- Parit Wacharasindhu, politician, Thailand
- Paul Yong Choo Kiong, politician, Malaysia
- Penny Low, politician, Singapore
- Peping Cojuangco, politician, Philippines
- Phoong Jin Zhe, politician, Malaysia
- Pita Limjaroenrat, politician, Thailand
- Piyabutr Saengkanokkul, politician, Thailand
- Png Eng Huat, politician, Singapore
- Poh Ah Tiam, politician, Malaysia
- Poh Li San, politician, Singapore
- Queenie Chong Chin Yee, politician, Brunei
- Rachel Ong, politician, Singapore
- Raul Roco, politician, Philippines
- Renhō, politician, Japan
- Reno Lim, politician, Philippines
- Rha Woong-bae, politician, South Korea
- Rian Ernest, politician, Indonesia
- Richard Ho, politician, Malaysia
- Richard Hu, politician, Singapore
- Ricky Jauwerissa, Regent of Tanimbar Islands, Indonesia
- Rico Sia, politician, Indonesia
- Robert Joppy Kardinal, politician, Indonesia
- Roderick Yong Yin Fatt, Secretary General of ASEAN, Brunei
- Rogelio de la Rosa, politician, Philippines
- Roland Eng, politician, Cambodia
- Roseller T. Lim, politician, Philippines
- Rudianto Tjen, politician, Indonesia
- Rudy Chua, politician, Indonesia
- Rudy Hermanto, politician, Indonesia
- Rusdi Kirana, businessman and politician, Deputy Speaker of the House of Representatives of Indonesia, Indonesia
- Sai Leun, politician, Myanmar
- Sam Rainsy, politician, Cambodia
- Sam Sary, politician, Cambodia
- Sandro Marcos, politician, Philippines
- Saptono Mustaqim, Deputy Regent of Lingga, Indonesia
- Satono, Regent of Sambas, Indonesia
- Sebastian Teo, politician, Singapore
- Sebastian Ting Chiew Yew, politician, Malaysia
- Seet Ai Mee, politician, Singapore
- Shawn Huang, politician, Singapore
- Sim Kui Hian, politician, Malaysia
- Sim Tze Tzin, politician, Malaysia
- Sim Tong Him, politician, Malaysia
- Simon Ooi Tze Min, politician, Malaysia
- Sin Boon Ann, politician, Singapore
- Sin Kek Tong, politician, Singapore
- Sitoh Yih Pin, politician, Singapore
- Soe Hok Gie, activist, Indonesia
- Soero Adinegoro, nobleman, Indonesia
- Sofyan Tan, politician, Indonesia
- Souw Beng Kong, politician, Indonesia
- Spencer Ng, politician, Singapore
- Stevano Rizki Adranacus, politician, Indonesia
- Steve Chia, politician, Singapore
- Steven Sim Chee Keong, politician, Malaysia
- Sudin, politician, Indonesia
- Susan Yap, politician, Philippines
- Stella Quimbo, politician, academician and economist, Philippines
- Steve Chia, politician, Singapore
- Sylvia Lim, politician, Singapore
- Tan Ah Eng, politician, Malaysia
- Tan Bee Yong, diplomat, Brunei
- Tan Chee Khoon, politician, Malaysia
- Tan Chen Choon, politician, Malaysia
- Tan Cheng Bock, politician, Singapore
- Tan Cheng Lok, politician, Malaysia
- Tan Chuan-Jin, Speaker of the Parliament of Singapore, Singapore
- Tan Eng Tie, politician, Indonesia
- Tan Hong Pin, politician, Malaysia
- Tan Jee Say, politician, Singapore
- Tan Kee Kwong, politician, Malaysia
- Tan Kok Wai, politician, Malaysia
- Tan Lee Fatt, politician, Malaysia
- Tan Lian Hoe, politician, Malaysia
- Tan Siew Sin, politician, Malaysia
- Tan Tee Beng, politician, Malaysia
- Tan Yee Kew, politician, Malaysia
- Tan Yu Sai, politician, Myanmar
- Tang Liang Hong, politician, Singapore
- Teh Kok Lim, politician, Malaysia
- Telly Tjanggulung, Regent of South Minahasa, Indonesia
- Teng Boon Soon, politician, Malaysia
- Teo Kok Seong, politician, Malaysia
- Teresa Kok, politician, Malaysia
- Thepthai Senapong, politician, Thailand
- Thio Thiam Tjong, politician, Indonesia
- Thomas Su Keong Siong, politician, Malaysia
- Ti Lian Ker, politician, Malaysia
- Tin Pei Ling, politician, Singapore
- Tioulong Saumura, politician, Cambodia
- Tito Sotto, politician, Philippines
- Tjung Tin Jan, politician, Indonesia
- Toni Supit, politician, Indonesia
- Tonny Tesar, politician, Indonesia
- Tony Pua, politician, Malaysia
- Tony Tan Lay Thiam, politician, Singapore
- Tony Wen, politician, Indonesia
- Veronica Koman, activist, Indonesia
- Veronica Tan, activist, Indonesia
- Viani Limardi, politician, Indonesia
- Vico Sotto, politician, Philippines
- Victor Gu, politician, Malaysia
- Victor Lye, politician, Singapore
- Vincente Yap Sotto, politician, Philippines
- Violet Yong, politician, Malaysia
- Vivian Wong Shir Yee, politician, Malaysia
- Wenceslao Vinzons, politician, Philippines
- Wee Jeck Seng, politician, Malaysia
- Weng Tojirakarn, politician, Thailand
- William Aditya Sarana, politician, Indonesia
- William Leong, politician, Malaysia
- Willie Ong, politician, Philippines
- Willybrodus Lay, Regent of Belu, Indonesia
- Win Gatchalian, politician, Philippines
- Wong Chen, politician, Malaysia
- Wong Chia Zhen, politician, Malaysia
- Wong Chun Sen, politician, Indonesia
- Wong Hon Wai, politician, Malaysia
- Wong Kah Woh, politician, Malaysia
- Wong Shu Qi, politician, Malaysia
- Wong Soon Koh, politician, Malaysia
- Wong Tack, politician, Malaysia
- Yansen Akun Effendy, Regent of Sanggau, Indonesia
- Yap Pian Hon, politician, Malaysia
- Yap Tjwan Bing, politician, Indonesia
- Yee Jenn Jong, politician, Singapore
- Yenny Wahid, politician, Indonesia
- Yeo Wan Ling, politician, Singapore
- Yeung Kwo, politician, Malaysia
- Yip Hon Weng, politician, Singapore
- Yorrys Raweyai, Deputy Speaker of the Regional Representative Council, Indonesia
- Yuichiro Hata, politician, Japan
- Zairil Khir Johari, politician, Malaysia
- Zaldy Co, politician, Philippines

==== Australasia ====
- Alec Fong Lim, Lord Mayor of Darwin, Australia
- Bernice Eu, politician, Australia
- Dio Wang, politician, Australia
- Dixon Seeto, politician and businessman, Fiji
- Ernest Wong, politician, Australia
- Gabriel Ng, politician, Australia
- Gai Brodtmann, politician, Australia
- Gladys Liu, politician, Australia
- Geoff Lee, politician, Australia
- Harry Tong, politician, Kiribati
- Helen Bullock, politician, Australia
- Henry Tsang, politician, Australia
- Hong Lim, politician, Australia
- Ian Goodenough, politician, Australia
- Jack Ah Kit, politician, Australia
- James Ah Koy, politician, Fiji
- Jenny Leong, politician, Australia
- Jian Yang, politician, New Zealand
- Jing Lee, politician, Australia
- Katrina Fong Lim, politician, Australia
- Kenneth Wang, New Zealand
- Laurie Chan, politician, Solomon Islands
- Lawrence Xu-Nan, politician, New Zealand
- Naisi Chen, politician, New Zealand
- Nancy Lu, politician, New Zealand
- Ngaree Ah Kit, politician, Australia
- Nicole Werner, politician, Australia
- Pierre Yang, politician, Australia
- Raymond Huo, politician, New Zealand
- Sally Sitou, politician, Australia
- Sam Lim, politician, Australia
- Sook Yee Lai, politician, Australia
- Tsebin Tchen, politician, Australia
- Tuala Falani Chan Tung, diplomat, Samoa
- Walter Schnaubelt, politician, Papua New Guinea
- Wellington Lee, Deputy Lord Mayor of Melbourne, Australia
- Wes Fang, politician, Australia
- William Yee, politician, Fiji
- Zhi Soon, politician, Australia

==== Africa ====
- Chris Wang, politician, South Africa
- Eugenia Chang, politician, South Africa
- Fay Chung, politician, Zimbabwe
- Jean Ping, Chair of the African Union Commission, Gabon
- Joseph Tsang Mang Kin, politician, Mauritius
- Moilin Jean Ah-Chuen, politician, Mauritius
- Sherry Chen, politician, South Africa
- Shiaan-Bin Huang, politician, South Africa
- Xiaomei Havard, politician, South Africa

==== Europe ====
- Alan Mak, politician, United Kingdom
- Aleksandra Wiśniewska, politician, Poland
- André Thien Ah Koon, politician, France
- Anna Lo, politician, United Kingdom
- Buon Tan, politician, France
- Hsiao Li Lindsay, Baroness Lindsay of Birker, politician, United Kingdom
- Ing Yoe Tan, politician, Netherlands
- James Lindsay, 3rd Baron Lindsay of Birker, politician, United Kingdom
- Jeanne d'Hauteserre, Mayor of the 8th arrondissement of Paris, France
- Julia Wong, politician, Norway
- Lydia Dunn, Baroness Dunn, politician and businesswoman, United Kingdom
- Mei Li Vos, politician, Netherlands
- Michael Chan, Baron Chan, physician and politician, United Kingdom
- Nat Wei, Baron Wei, politician, United Kingdom
- Sarah Owen, politician, United Kingdom
- Steven Dominique Cheung, politician, United Kingdom
- Varina Tjon-A-Ten, politician, Netherlands
- Victoria Treadell, diplomat, United Kingdom

==== North America ====
- Aaron Ling Johanson, Minority Leader of Hawaii House of Representatives, United States
- Arnold Chan, MP for Scarborough-Agincourt, Canada
- Barry Wong, Member of Arizona House of Representatives, United States
- Charles Djou, US Representative from Hawaii, United States
- Daniel Akaka, former US Senator from Hawaii, United States
- David S. C. Chu, Under Secretary of Defense for Readiness, United States
- David Wu, US Representative from Oregon; first and only Chinese American US Representative from Oregon, United States
- Edwin M. Lee, former city manager & mayor of San Francisco, California, United States
- Eric Chang, politician, Belize
- Geng Tan, MP of Don Valley North, Canada
- Grace Meng, US Representative from New York, United States
- Hiram L. Fong, former US Senator from Hawaii, United States
- Jim Chu, Chief Constable of the Vancouver Police Department, Canada
- Jimmy Meng, US Representative from New York, United States
- John Liu, member of the New York City Council, United States
- Judy Chu, US Representative from California, United States
- Kimberly Yee, State Treasurer of Arizona, United States
- Ling Ling Chang, California State Senator, United States
- March Fong Eu, Secretary of State of California, United States
- Matthew K. Fong, former California State Treasurer, United States
- Shien Biau Woo, former attorney general and lieutenant governor of Delaware, current president of the 80-20 Initiative, United States
- Tammy Duckworth, US Senator from Illinois, United States
- Ted Lieu, US Representative from California, United States
- Vivienne Poy, Senator, Canada

==== South America ====
- Enrique Wong Pujada, politician, Peru
- Humberto Lay, politician, Peru
- José Antonio Chang, politician, Peru
- Robert Victor Evan Wong, politician, Guyana
- Victor Joy Way, politician, Peru

== Academicians ==
=== Mathematicians ===
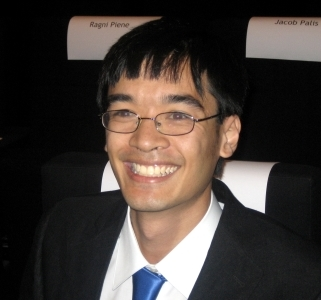
Fields Medal winner child genius Terence Tao is an ethnic Chinese child genius

- Terence Tao: child genius Fields Medal winner
- Yu Deng: Fields Medal winner
- Lenhard Ng: child genius math genius
- Zhuo Qun Song: won most gold medals at math IMO
- Xiuxiong Chen: mathematician
- Chern Shiing-shen, mathematician
- Shing-Tung Yau: Fields Medal winner

=== Scientists, engineers, medicine ===
- An Wang, computer engineer, United States
- Arief Budiman, sociologist, Indonesia
- Chang-Lin Tien, engineer and previous Chancellor of UC Berkeley, United States
- Charles K. Kao, scientists, 2009 Nobel laureate in Physics
- Da-Wen Sun, engineer, Ireland
- David Ho, AIDS researcher, 1998 Nobel laureate in Physics, United States
- Daniel C. Tsui, scientist, United States
- Gilbert Chu, biochemist, United States
- Jenny Zhang, chemist, Australia
- Kai-Fu Lee, computer scientist, United States
- Ken Yeang, architect, Malaysia
- Kerry Sieh, geologist and seismologist, United States
- Kevin Fong, space physiologist, United Kingdom
- Lee Wei Ling, neurologist, Singapore
- Mely G. Tan, sociologist, Indonesia
- Min Chueh Chang, reproductive biologist, United States
- Moi Meng Ling, virologist, Malaysia
- Ngeow Sze Chan, physician, Malaysia
- Sally Oey, astronomer, United States
- Steven Chu, scientist, 1997 Nobel Prize winner in Physics, United States
- Victor Chang, surgeon, Australia
- Wen Ho Lee, scientist, United States
- Wong Siew Te, zoologist, Malaysia

=== Historian, Economist, International Relations, Political Analyst ===
- Anand Yang, historian, India
- Anthony Chan, economist, United States
- Christianto Wibisono, economics analyst, Indonesia
- Hadi Soesastro, economist, Indonesia
- Ien Ang, culturalist, Indonesia
- Karl Kendrick Chua, economist, Philippines
- Lee Poh Ping, international relations, Malaysia
- Li Shengwu, economist, Singapore
- Linda Yueh, economist, United Kingdom
- Myra Sidharta, historian, Indonesia
- Ong Hok Ham, historian, Indonesia
- Thee Kian Wee, economist, historian, Indonesia
- Teng Ssu-yü, historian and sinologist, United States
- Wang Gungwu, historian, sinologist and writer, Australia
- William Hsiao, economist, United States
- Xiao Chua, historian, Philippines
- Xiaokai Yang, economist, Australia
- Yew-Kwang Ng, economist, Australia

== Artists and performers ==
=== Actors and actresses ===
- Agnes Monica, actress, Indonesia
- Alexa Chung, TV presenter, England
- Alice Ong, actress and model, Myanmar
- Aloysius Pang, actor, Singapore
- Amber Chia, actress and model, Malaysia
- Archie Khao, actor and model, United States
- Awkwafina, actress and rapper, United States
- Baim Wong, actor, Indonesia
- Baldo Marro, actor, screenwriter, stunt director, film director, producer, Philippines
- Benedict Wong, actor, United Kingdom
- Benjamin Kheng, actor and singer, Singapore
- Benson Fong, actor, United States
- Bérénice Marlohe, actress, France
- Bowen Yang, actor and comedian, United States
- Boy William, actor, Indonesia
- Burt Kwouk, actor, born in England
- Brandon Lee, actor born in Oakland, California; son of Bruce Lee
- Bruce Lee, actor and martial arts master born in San Francisco, worked in Hong Kong and the United States
- Chelsea Olivia, actress, Indonesia
- Constance Wu, actor, United States
- Cindy Gulla, actress, YouTuber, Indonesia
- Dyana Liu, actress, United States
- Eliza Sam, actress, Canada
- Fann Wong, actress, Singapore
- Fifi Young, actress, Indonesia
- Garrett Richard Wang, actor, United States
- Gemma Chan, actress, United Kingdom
- Haing S. Ngor, actor, born in Cambodia, worked in the United States
- Harry Shum, Jr., actor, United States
- Heart Evangelista, actress, Philippines
- James Ma, actor, Thailand
- Jackie Chan, actor born in Hong Kong, works internationally, mainly in the United States
- James Hong, actor, United States
- Javi Rai, actor, United States
- Jessica Henwick, actress, England
- Joe Taslim, actor, Indonesia
- Kam Fong Chun, actor, United States
- Kanny Theng, actress and model, Singapore
- Katie Leung, actress, Scotland
- Ke Huy Quan, actor, United States
- Keanu Reeves, actor, Canada
- Keye Luke, actor, United States
- Kim Chiu, actress, singer, TV Host, Philippines
- Kris Aquino, actress and TV host, Philippines
- Lucy Liu, actress, born in New York City
- Maggie Cheung, actress born in Hong Kong, raised in the UK, works mainly in Hong Kong and Europe
- Melvin Giovanie, actor, Indonesia
- Michael Chow Man-Kin, actor born in Canada, based in Hong Kong
- Michelle Chong, actress, Singapore
- Michelle Yeoh, actress, Malaysia
- Morgan Oey, actor and musician, Indonesia
- Nadine Chandrawinata, actress, Indonesia
- Olivia Munn, actress and TV presenter, United States
- Rosalind Chao, actress, United States
- Richard Loo, actor, United States
- Rui En, actress and singer, Singapore
- Sahil Khan, actor, India
- Shannon Kook, actor, South Africa
- Shannon Lee, actress born in Los Angeles; daughter of Bruce Lee
- Takeshi Kaneshiro, actor, Japan
- Thaddea Graham, actress, United Kingdom
- Tsuyoshi Abe, actor, Japan
- Vico Thai, actor, Australia
- Victor Sen Yung, actor, United States
- Yoson An, actor, New Zealand
- Zeng Huifen, actress, Singapore
- Zoe Tay, actress, Singapore
- Zoren Legaspi, actor, director, and host, Philippines

=== Filmmakers ===
- Ang Lee, United States
- Dai Sijie, France
- Jack Neo, Singapore
- James Lee, Malaysia
- James Wong, United States
- James Wan, Australia
- Roseanne Liang, New Zealand
- Royston Tan, Singapore
- Lionel Chok, Singapore
- Tan Chui Mui, Malaysia
- Teguh Karya, born Steve Liem Tjoan Hok, Indonesia
- Tsai Ming-liang, Malaysia
- Tze Chun, United States

=== Musicians ===
- Agatha Pricilla, Indonesia
- Agnez Mo, Indonesia
- Amber Liu, United States
- Angelica Lee, Malaysia
- Ayke Agus, Indonesia
- Bic Runga, New Zealand
- Catalina Yue, Canada
- Chan Kwok Fai, Malaysia
- Chelsea Olivia, Indonesia
- Cindy Yuvia, Indonesia
- Daryl Ong, Philippines
- David Fung, Australia
- Eden, Ireland
- Eric Moo, Malaysia
- Ferlyn Wong, Singapore
- Fish Leong, Malaysia
- Freya Lim, Malaysia
- Gary Cao, Malaysia
- Imee Ooi, Malaysia
- JJ Lin, Singapore
- Jin Au-Yeung, United States
- Joanna Dong, Singapore
- Jose Mari Chan, Philippines
- Karen Kong, Malaysia
- Kriesha Chu, Philippines
- Kit Chan, Singapore
- Lam Truong, Vietnam
- Maia Lee, Singapore
- Michael Wong, Malaysia
- Namewee, Malaysia
- Natalie Ong, Australia
- Narelle Kheng, Singapore
- Ne-Yo, United States
- Nicholas Teo, Malaysia
- Pance Pondaag, Indonesia
- Penny Tai, Malaysia
- Prema Yin, Malaysia
- Rich Brian, Indonesia
- Ronnie Liang, Philippines
- Shani Indira Natio, Indonesia
- Shania Junianatha, Indonesia
- Shinta Naomi, Indonesia
- Sylvester Sim, Singapore
- Stefanie Sun, Singapore
- Tan Zhi Hui Celine, Malaysia
- Tanya Chua, Singapore
- Ten, Thailand
- Vicky Shu, Indonesia
- Vienna Teng, United States
- Warren Hue, Indonesia
- Wing, New Zealand
- Yo Yo Ma, United States

=== Comedians ===
- Aaron Chen, comedian, Australia
- Ateng, comedian, Indonesia
- Douglas Lim, comedian, Malaysia
- Ed Hill, comedian, Canada
- Ernest Prakasa, comedian, Indonesia
- Jeff Tam, comedian, Philippines
- Jenny Yang, comedian, United States
- Joe Wong, comedian, United States
- Kristina Wong, comedian, United States
- Lawrence Leung, comedian, Australia
- Michael V., comedian, Philippines
- Nigel Ng, comedian and YouTuber, Malaysia
- Raybon Kan, comedian, columnist, New Zealand
- Ronny Chieng, comedian, Malaysia

=== Video game designers ===
- Jenova Chen, United States

=== Voice actors ===
- Kaiji Tang, United States
- Keiko Han, Japan
- Megumi Han, Japan

=== Internet Personality ===
- Angelina Christy, Indonesia
- Annette Lee, Singapore
- Disguised Toast, Canada
- JianHao Tan, Singapore
- KevJumba, United States
- Scarra, United States
- Sisca Kohl, Indonesia
- Steven He, Ireland
- TwoSet Violin, Australia
- Yvonne Ng, Canada
- Zach King, United States

== Athletes ==
- Aaron Chia, badminton player, Malaysia
- Abraham Damar Grahita, basketball, Indonesia
- Agatha Wong, wushu, Philippines
- Alan Budikusuma, badminton, Olympic gold medalist, Indonesia
- Aldila Sutjiadi, tennis player, Indonesia
- Alex Yoong, race driver, Malaysia
- Alexa Loo, snowboarder, Canada
- Alice Lee, chess player, United States
- Ang Peng Siong, swimmer, Singapore
- Anne Pang, kung fu, Australia
- Anthony Liu, figure skater
- Atthaya Thitikul, golfer, Thailand
- Avianna Chao, shooter, Canada
- Beatrisa Liang, figure skater, United States
- Brian Moore, rugby, United Kingdom
- Carlos Yulo, artistic gymnast, Philippines
- Caroline Zhang, figure skater, United States
- Cerezo Fung a Wing, footballer
- Chan Chong Ming, badminton player, Malaysia
- Chew Choon Eng, badminton player, Malaysia
- Choong Tan Fook, badminton player, Malaysia
- Chris John, boxer, Indonesia
- Christina Gao, figure skater, United States
- Chuck Sun, motocross racer, United States
- Cody Sun, esports, Canada
- Dang Qiu, table tennis, Germany
- Debby Susanto, badminton player, Indonesia
- Diana Wuisan, table tennis, Indonesia
- Dion Cools, footballer, Malaysia
- Eden Cheng, diver, United Kingdom
- Edhi Handoko, chess, Indonesia
- Eldrew Yulo, artistic gymnast, Philippines
- Elkan Baggott, footballer, Indonesia
- Emma Raducanu, tennis player, United Kingdom
- Endang Witarsa, footballer, Indonesia
- Eng Hian, badminton player, Indonesia
- Esther Qin, diver, Australia
- Felipe Wu, sport shooter, Brazil
- Ferry Sonneville, badminton player, Indonesia
- Frank Soo, footballer, England
- Gec Chia, basketball player, Philippines
- Goh Tat Chuan, footballer, Singapore
- Goh Liu Ying, badminton player, Indonesia
- Greysia Polii, badminton player, Olympic gold medalist, Indonesia
- Gui Lin, table tennis, Brazil
- He Zhi Wen, table tennis, Spain
- Hendra Setiawan, badminton player, Olympic Gold medalist, Indonesia
- Ho-Pin Tung, race driver, Netherlands
- Hosea Wong, wushu, Brunei
- Hunter Poon, cricketer, Australia
- Imron Rosadi, weightlifter, Indonesia
- Irene Kharisma Sukandar, chess, Indonesia
- Isabelle Li, table tennis, Singapore
- Jaspar Yu Woon Chai, badminton player, Brunei
- Janice Tjen, tennis, Indonesia
- Jeremy Lin, NBA basketball player, United States
- Jeremy Ten, figure skater, Canada
- Jiang Yanmei, badminton player, Singapore
- Jing Jun Hong, table tennis player, Singapore
- Joe Choong, pentathlete, United Kingdom
- John Juanda, poker, Indonesia
- Jonathan Christie, badminton player, Indonesia
- Jonathan Foo, cricketer, Guyana
- Jonathan Klinsmann, footballer, United States
- Josias Ng, cyclist, Malaysia
- Jwala Gutta, badminton player, India
- Karen Chen, figure skater, United States
- Kevin Sanjaya, badminton player, Indonesia
- Lee Chong Wei, badminton player, Malaysia
- Lee Zii Jia, badminton player, Malaysia
- Lee Wan Wah, badminton player, Malaysia
- Lester Wong, fencer, Canada
- Li Donghua, gymnastics, Switzerland
- Li Jiawei, table tennis player, Singapore
- Li Li, badminton player, Singapore
- Li Tu, tennis player, Australia
- Lindswell Kwok, wushu, Indonesia
- Liliyana Natsir, badminton legend, Indonesia
- Liem Swie King, badminton legend, Indonesia
- Lim Eng Beng, basketball player, Philippines
- Lisa Wang, gymnast, United States
- Loh Kean-yew, badminton player, Singapore
- Maggie Mac Neil, swimmer, Olympic gold medalist, Canada
- Marcus Fernaldi Gideon, badminton player, Indonesia
- Maria Fransisca, badminton, Indonesia
- Mark Chay, swimmer, Singapore
- Michael Chang, tennis player, United States
- Michelle Kwan, figure skater, United States
- Mikaël Silvestre, footballer, France
- Mira Leung, figure skater, Canada
- Mo Heng Tan, footballer, Indonesia
- Muljadi, badminton player, Indonesia
- Nathan Chen, figure skater, United States
- Nathan Tjoe-A-On, footballer, Indonesia
- Nova Arianto, footballer, Indonesia
- Ng Ser Miang, sailor, Singapore
- Oscar Piastri, race driver, Australia
- Patrick Chan, figure skater, Canada
- Poh Seng Song, athlete, Singapore
- Praveen Jordan, badminton player, Indonesia
- Remy Ong, bowling player, Singapore
- Ricardo Gelael, rally driver, Indonesia
- Ricardo Moniz, football player, Netherlands
- Richard Chee Quee, cricketer, Australia
- Rio Haryanto, race driver, Indonesia
- Rose Zhang, golfer, United States
- Ruben Gunawan, chess grandmaster, Indonesia
- Rudy Hartono, badminton legend, Indonesia
- Pi Hongyan, badminton player, France
- Sadaharu Oh, baseball player, Japan
- Samboy Lim, basketball player, Philippines
- Sean Gelael, race driver, Indonesia
- Shaoang Liu, speed skater, Hungary
- Shaolin Sándor Liu, speed skater, Hungary
- Soh Wooi Yik, badminton player, Malaysia
- Sugi Sito, wrestler, Mexico
- Susi Susanti, badminton, Olympic gold medalist, Indonesia
- Tan Aik Huang, badminton, Malaysia
- Tan Ling How, footballer, Indonesia
- Thio Hok Seng, weightlifter, Indonesia
- Tiffany Chin, figure skater, United States
- Tông Anh Tý, football, Vietnam
- Utami Kinard, badminton, Indonesia
- Vincent Zhou, figure skater, United States
- Wong Choong Hann, badminton player Malaysia
- Wong Mew Choo, badminton player, Malaysia
- Wong Peng Soon, badminton player, Malaysia
- Wynne Prakusya, tennis player, Indonesia
- Xu Huaiwen, athlete, Germany
- Yang Fen, table tennis, Congo
- Yao Jie, badminton player, Netherlands
- Yvonne Li, badminton player, Germany
- Yuhan Tan, badminton player, Belgium
- Zeng Jian, table tennis, Singapore
- Li Qian, table tennis, Poland
- Wang Zengyi, table tennis, Poland

== Businesspeople ==
- Adrian Zecha, Indonesia
- Alfonso Yuchengco, Philippines
- Alfred Chuang, United States
- Andrea Chung, Canada
- Andrew Cherng, Panda Express, United States
- Andrew Darwis, Indonesia
- Andrew Ng, Coursera, United Kingdom
- Andrew Yang, United States
- Anthoni Salim (Liem Hong Sien), Salim Group, Indonesia
- Anthony Leong, Indonesia
- Armand Hartono, Bank Central Asia, Indonesia
- Arsjad Rasjid, Indonesia
- Banthoon Lamsam, Thailand
- Ben Chiu, Canada
- Bing Lee, Australia
- Brian Wong, Canada
- Chaleo Yoovidhya, Red Bull, Thailand
- Chalerm Yoovidhya, Thailand
- Changpeng Zhao, Binance, Canada
- Charles B. Wang, United States
- Chin Sophonpanich, Entrepreneur, Thailand
- Chatri Sophonpanich, Thailand
- Chartsiri Sophonpanich, Thailand
- Cherie Nursalim, Indonesia
- Choti Lamsam, Entrepreneur, Thailand
- Ciputra, Ciputra Group, Indonesia
- Dato Sri Tahir, Mayapada, Indonesia
- David Kan, South Africa
- David Ji, United States
- David Teoh, Australia
- David Wang, Australia
- Dexter Goei, United States
- Dhanin Chearavanont (Chia Kok Min), Chaoren Pokphand, Thailand
- Eddie Lembong, Indonesia
- Eduardo "Danding" Cojuangco Jr., Philippines
- Edwin Soeryadjaya, Astra International, Indonesia
- Eka Tjipta Widjaja, Sinarmas Group, Indonesia
- Eric Yuan, United States
- Francis Yeoh, Malaysia
- Fuganto Widjaja, Indonesia
- Garibaldi Thohir, Indonesia
- Gary Ho, Canada
- Gary Wang, FTX, United States
- George Ty, Philippines
- Hary Tanoesoedibjo, MNC Group, Indonesia
- Hendra Lembong, Indonesia
- Henry Sy, Philippines
- Jacob Soetoyo, Indonesia
- James Riady, Indonesia
- Jeffrey Cheah, Sunway Group, Malaysia
- Jensen Huang, Nvidia, United States
- Jerry Yang, United States
- Jimmy Choo, Malaysia
- John Gokongwei, Philippines
- Justin Kan, Twitch, United States
- Khoo Teck Puat, Entrepreneur, Singapore
- Kimun Ongkosandjojo, Indonesia
- Korawad Chearavanont, Thailand
- Kuncoro Wibowo, Indonesia
- Kwek Leng Beng, Singapore
- Lee Kong Chian, Entrepreneur, Singapore
- Lee Choon Seng, Entrepreneur, Singapore
- Lee Hsien Yang, Singapore
- Liem Seeng Tee, Sampoerna, Indonesia
- Lien Ying Chow, Singapore
- Lilian Too, Malaysia
- Lim Goh Tong, Entrepreneur, Malaysia
- Lim Kok Thay, Malaysia
- Lisa Su, AMD, United States
- Loh Boon Siew, Malaysia
- Low Kiok Chiang, Singapore
- Low Tuck Kwong, Indonesia
- Lucio Tan, Entrepreneur, Philippines
- Luis Yangco, Philippines
- Mark Chang Mun Kee, Malaysia
- Martua Sitorus, Indonesia
- Michael Bambang Hartono, Indonesia
- Mochtar Riady, Lippo Group, Indonesia
- Olivia Lum, Singapore
- Panthongthae Shinawatra, Thailand
- Peter Pek, Malaysia
- Perry Chen, Kickstarter, United States
- Petrus Kanisius Ojong, Indonesia
- Prajogo Pangestu, Barito Pacific Group Indonesia
- Quek Leng Chan, Malaysia
- Ramon S. Ang, Philippines
- Rebekah Yeoh, Malaysia
- Richard Teng, Binance, Singapore
- Robert Budi Hartono, Indonesia
- Robert Kuok, Entrepreneur, Malaysia
- Ruth Yeoh, Malaysia
- Sehat Sutardja, Marvell Technology, United States
- Seow Poh Leng, Singapore
- Shou Zhi Chew, TikTok, Singapore
- Soejipto Nagaria (梁世楨), Summarecon Agung, Indonesia
- Sofjan Wanandi, Indonesia
- Sondhi Limthongkul, Thailand
- Stern Hu, Australia
- Steve Chen, United States
- Sudono Salim (Liem Sioe Liong), Entrepreneur, Indonesia
- Sugianto Kusuma, Agung Sedayu Group, Indonesia
- Sukanto Tanoto, Indonesia
- Sutanto Djuhar, Indonesia
- Suphachai Chearavanont, Thailand
- Surya Wonowidjojo, Gudang Garam, Indonesia
- Susilo Wonowidjojo, Gudang Garam, Indonesia
- Tan Hiok Nee, Malaysia
- Tan Kah Kee, Entrepreneur, Singapore
- Tan Kin Lian, Singapore
- Tan Kim Ching, Singapore, Thailand, Malaysia
- Teddy Yip, Indonesia, Netherlands
- Teh Hong Piow, Malaysia
- Tina Lee, Canada
- Tiong Hiew King, Malaysia
- Tjong A Fie, Indonesia
- Tom Ah Chee, New Zealand
- Tom Chan, Canada
- Tong Djoe, Tunas Group, Indonesia
- Tony Tan Caktiong, Jollibee, Philippines
- Tony Winata, Indonesia
- Vichai Srivaddhanaprabha, King Power, Thailand
- Victor Tsao, United States
- Vincent Tan, Malaysia
- Wee Cho Yaw, Singapore
- Wee Ee Cheong, Singapore
- William Cheng, Malaysia
- William Lauw-Zecha, Indonesia
- William Soeryadjaya, Astra International, Indonesia
- William Tanuwijaya, Tokopedia, Indonesia
- Wong Ah Sat, Australia
- Xu Rongmao, Australia
- Yap Goan Ho, Indonesia
- Yeoh Tiong Lay, Malaysia

== Law ==
- Albertina Ho, Supreme Court Judge, Indonesia
- Albino SyCip, banker and lawyer, Philippines
- Chan Sek Keong, 3rd Chief Justice, Singapore
- Chang Min Tat, Federal court judge, Malaysia
- Claudio Teehankee, Chief Justice, Philippines
- Denny Chin, District Judge, United States
- James C. Ho, United States
- Jose Yulo, Chief Justice, Philippines
- Kwa Geok Choo, Singapore
- Mai Chen, constitutional lawyer, New Zealand
- Ong Hock Thye, Chief Judge, Malaysia
- Pedro Yap, Chief Justice, Philippines
- Steven Chong Wan Oon, 5th Chief Justice, Brunei
- Tan Boon Teik, Attorney-General, Singapore
- Thomas Tang, Federal Judge, United States
- Woon Cheong Ming Walter, Singapore
- Wee Chong Jin, 1st Chief Justice, Singapore
- Yap Thiam Hien, lawyer and activist, Indonesia
- Yong Pung How, 2nd Chief Justice, Singapore

== Military officers and soldiers ==
- Vice Admiral Aaron Beng, Chief of Defence Force, Singapore
- Albert Kwok Fen Nam, war hero and leader of the "Kinabalu Guerrillas" against Japanese occupation, Malaysia
- Arthur Chin, fighter pilot, United States
- Billy Sing, sniper during the Gallipoli Campaign, Australia
- Brigadier General Coral Wong Pietsch, United States
- Major General Daniel Tjen, Indonesia
- Fang Wong, National Commander of The American Legion (2011–2012), United States
- Captain Francis B. Wai, United States
- James Yee, military chaplain, United States
- Rear Admiral Gordon Pai'ea Chung-Hoon, United States
- Rear Admiral John Lie Tjeng Tjoan, Indonesia
- Major Kurt Lee, first Chinese American Marine Corps officer, United States
- Lau Sing Kee, first Chinese American to be awarded the Distinguished Service Cross, United States
- Lieutenant General Melvyn Ong, Singapore
- First Air Marshall Rudi "Tarantula" Taran, fighter pilot, Indonesia
- Brigadier General Teddy Jusuf (Him Tek Ji), Indonesia
- General Vicente Lim, Philippines
- Lieutenant General Winston Choo Wee Leong, Singapore

== Religious leaders ==
=== Buddhism ===
- Ashin Jinarakkhita, prominent figure in the Revival of Indonesian Buddhism, Indonesia
- Buddhādasa Bhikkhu, prominent Buddhist Reformer, Thailand
- Venerable Chi Chern, Chan master of Sheng Yen lineage and principal of the Malaysian Buddhist Institute, Malaysia
- Venerable Prof. KL Dhammajoti, well-known Buddhist scholar, Malaysia
- Venerable Hong Choon, 2nd president of SBF and Buddhist leader, Singapore
- Jakusho Kwong – Zen Buddhist Master of Shunryu Suzuki lineage and founder of Sonoma Mountain Zen Center, United States
- Venerable Long Gen, 7th president of SBF and Buddhist leader, Singapore
- Prayudh Payutto, Theravadin Buddhist scholar monk and prolific writer, Thailand
- Bhante Sujiva, well-known teacher of Vipassana in the Theravāda Buddhist Tradition
- Sayadaw U Tejaniya, Theravādin Buddhist monk and famous meditation teacher, Myanmar
- Somdet Kiaw, Acting Supreme Patriarch of Thailand and abbot of Wat Saket, Thailand
- Jimmy Yu (Guo Gu), Chan teacher of Sheng Yen lineage, associate professor of religion at Florida State University and founder of Tallahassee Chan Center, United States
- Venerable Zhuan Dao, Founder of the KMSPKS and Buddhist leader, Singapore

=== Christianity ===
- Francis Xavier Kriengsak Kovithavanij, Archbishop of Bangkok, Thailand
- Reverend Greg Homeming, Catholic bishop, Australia
- Reverend Ivan Lee, Anglican bishop, Australia
- Jaime Sin, Roman Catholic Cardinal Archbishop, Philippines
- John Allen Chau, American Christian missionary who got killed by Sentinelese natives
- Luis Antonio Tagle, Archbishop of Manila, Philippines
- Stephen Tong, Indonesian Reformed Evangelist, Indonesia

=== Islam ===
- Anton Medan, Islamic preacher, Indonesia
- Felix Siauw, Islamic preacher, Indonesia
- Hussein Ye, Islamic preacher and scholar, Malaysia
- Junus Jahja, Islamic preacher, Indonesia
- Sunan Bonang, one of the Wali Sanga, Indonesia

=== Confucianism ===
- Bingky Irawan, Confucian priest, Indonesia
- Chandra Setiawan, Confucian community leader, Indonesia

=== Taoism ===
- Chow Yam-nam (白龍王), well-known guru and has been known as a "living saint", Thailand
- Moy Lin-shin, Taoist monk and founder of Fung Loy Kok Institute of Taoism, Canada

== Seamen ==
- Lim Poon BEM, shipwreck survivor

== Writers, poets and artists ==
=== Asia ===
- Aaron Lee, Singapore
- Alvin Pang, author, Singapore
- Ang Jan Goan, Indonesia
- Catherine Lim, Singapore
- Clara Ng, Indonesia
- Grace Chin, columnist, Malaysia
- Mira W., Indonesia
- Russell Lee, Singapore
- Shirley Geok-lin Lim, Malaysia
- Su-Chen Christine Lim, Singapore
- Tan Swie Hian, Singapore
- Yangsze Choo, Malaysia

=== Australasia ===
- Jack Yan, publisher, author, New Zealand

=== Europe ===
- François Cheng, writer, France
- Gao Xingjian, writer, France
- Helen Tse, author, United Kingdom
- Jung Chang, author, United Kingdom
- Tash Aw, writer, United Kingdom
- Timothy Mo, author, United Kingdom
- Xiaolu Guo, author, United Kingdom

=== North America ===
- Amy Chua, author and professor of law. United States
- Amy Tan, author, United States
- Gish Jen, author, United States
- Ha Jin, author, United States
- Helen Zia, journalist, United States
- Iris Chang, journalist and historian, United States
- Jean Kwok, author, United States
- Jeff Yang, columnist, United States
- Laura Ling, journalist, United States
- Lisa Ling, journalist, United States
- Mellissa Fung, journalist, Canada

== Art, design, culinary ==
- Alexander Wang, fashion designer, United States
- Amber Chia, international model, Malaysia
- Ang Kiukok, artist, Philippines
- Angel Chang, fashion designer, United States
- Chen Kenichi, chef, Japan
- Derek Lam, fashion designer, United States
- I. M. Pei, architect, United States
- Jack Lee, chef, United States
- Jimmy Choo, designer, Malaysia
- John Clang / John C.L. Ang, photographer, Singapore
- Justin Quek, chef, Singapore
- Ling Tan, model, Malaysia
- Maya Lin, artist and architect, United States
- Michelle Yeoh, fashion influencer, United Kingdom
- Ming Tsai, chef, United States
- Poh Ling Yeow, celebrity chef, Australia
- Rachel Yeoh, fashion influencer, United Kingdom
- Vivienne Tam, fashion designer, United States
- Sebastian Gunawan, fashion designer, Indonesia
- Sherson Lian, chef, Malaysia
- Soo K. Chan, architect, Singapore
- Susur Lee, chef/restaurateur, originally from British Hong Kong, based in Toronto, Canada
- Zao Wou Ki, painter, France

== Criminals ==
- Adrian Lim, murderer, Singapore
- Amos Yee, sex offender, Singapore
- Andrew Chan, drug trafficker, Australia
- Anthony Ler, murderer, Singapore
- Botak Chin, robber, Malaysia
- Chia Kee Chen, murderer, Singapore
- Chia Teck Leng, fraudster, Singapore
- Cheong Chun Yin, drug trafficker, Malaysia
- Chua Ser Lien, kidnapper, Singapore
- Eddy Tansil, corruptor, Indonesia
- Elliot Rodger, murderer, United States
- Jimmy Chua Chap Seng, gunman, Singapore
- Jho Low, corruptor, Malaysia
- Jose Oyson, drug syndicate leader, Philippines
- Katrina Leung, double agent, United States
- Kelvin Lim Hock Hin, sex offender, Singapore
- Kher Tian Hock, murderer, Malaysia
- Kho Jabing, murderer, Malaysia
- Khor Kok Soon, gunman, Singapore
- Lee Sze Yong, kidnapper, Singapore
- Leong Siew Chor, murderer, Singapore
- Lim Chwee Soon, gunman, Singapore
- Lim Keng Peng, murderer, Singapore
- Mimi Wong, murderer, Singapore
- Ng Theng Shuang, gunman, Malaysia
- Nyu Kok Meng, robber, Malaysia
- Oey Tamba Sia, murderer, Indonesia
- Poh Yuan Nie, fugitive, Singapore
- Sek Kim Wah, serial killer, Singapore
- Si Yi Chen, drug trafficker, Australia
- Sim Ah Cheoh, drug trafficker, Singapore
- Stephen Tse, street gangster, United States
- Sunny Ang, murderer, Singapore
- Tan Chor Jin, triad leader, Singapore
- Tan Ping Koon, kidnapper, Singapore
- Teh Kim Hong, murderer, Malaysia
- Teo Cheng Kiat, fraudster, Singapore
- Took Leng How, murderer, Malaysia
- Vincent Lee Chuan Leong, kidnapper, Singapore
- Vincent Li, murderer, Canada
- Wayne Lo, murderer, United States
- Yap Weng Wah, sex offender, Malaysia
- Yong Vui Kong, drug trafficker, Malaysia
- Zheng Yongshan, murderer, Japan

== See also ==
- List of Chinese people
- List of Chinese Americans
- List of Chinese Australians
- List of Chinese British
- List of Chinese Canadians
- List of Chinese Filipinos
- List of Malaysian Chinese
- List of Chinese New Zealanders
- Overseas Chinese
- Chinese Singaporean
- Chinese Thai
- Chinese Indonesian
- List of Hokkien people
- List of Cantonese people
- List of politicians of Chinese descent
