= 2024 North Maluku gubernatorial election =

| ← 2018 | 27 November 2024 | 2029 → |
- Turnout: 75.27% (▲3.59pp)
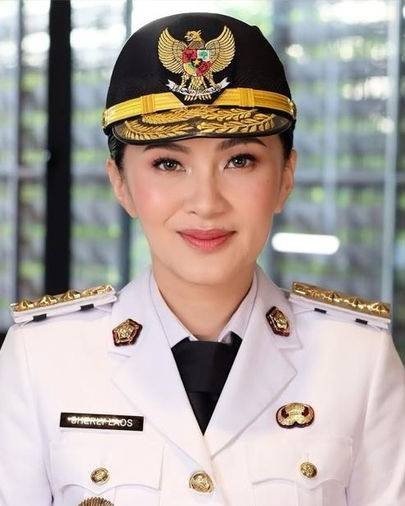

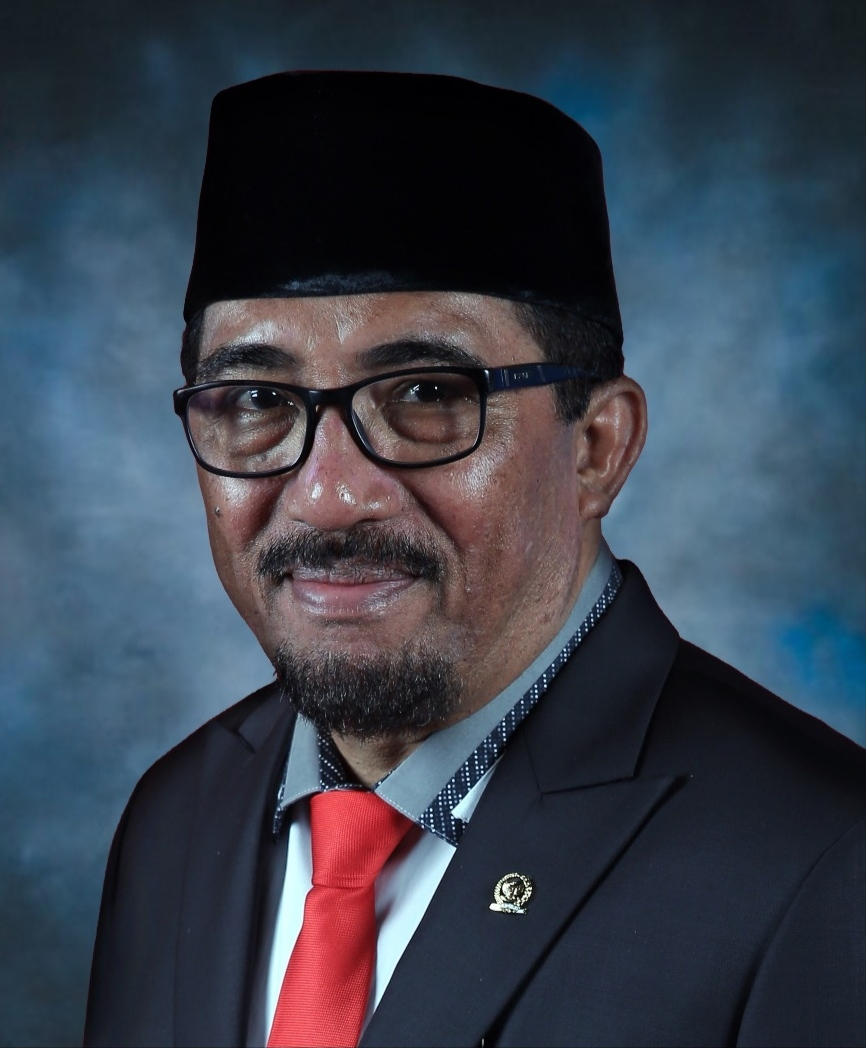

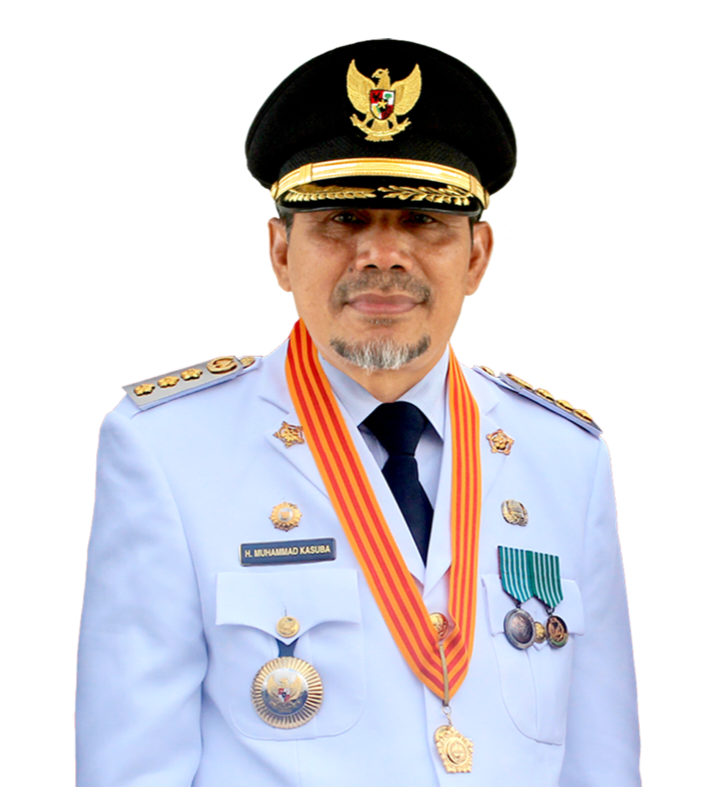

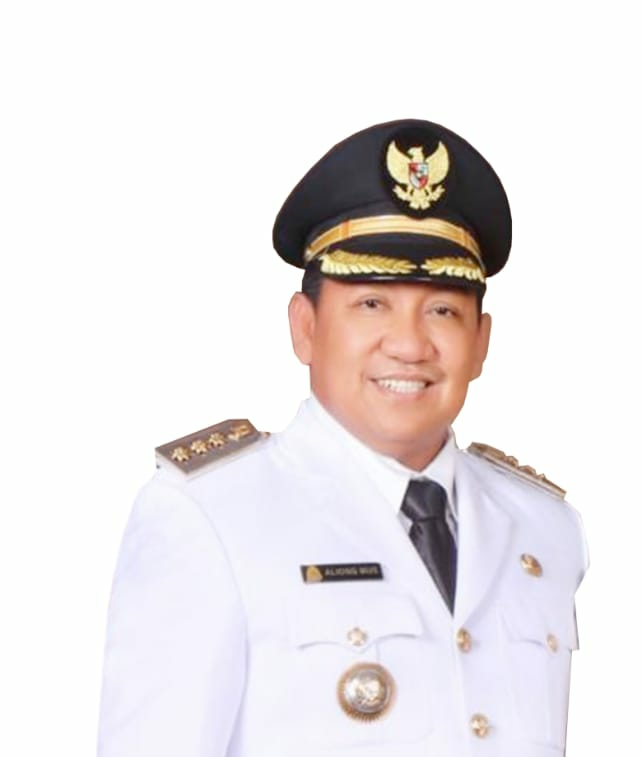
| Candidate | Sherly Tjoanda | Husain Alting Sjah |
| Party | Independent | PDI-P |
| Running mate | Sarbin Sehe | Asrul Rasyid Ichsan |
| Popular vote | 359,416 | 168,174 |
| Percentage | 51.68% | 24.18% |
| Candidate | Muhammad Kasuba | Aliong Mus |
| Party | PKS | Golkar |
| Alliance | – | KIM Plus |
| Running mate | Basri Salama | Sahril Thahir |
| Popular vote | 91,297 | 76,605 |
| Percentage | 13.13% | 11.01% |
- Results map by district
Governor before election
Samsuddin Abdul Kadir (acting)
Independent
Elected Governor
Sherly Tjoanda
Independent

The 2024 North Maluku gubernatorial election was held on 27 November 2024 as part of nationwide local elections to elect the governor and vice governor of North Maluku for a five-year term. The previous election was held in 2018. Gubernatorial candidate Benny Laos, a former regent of Morotai Island, died in a speedboat explosion before the election. Laos' coalition nominated his widow, Sherly Tjoanda, in his place, who went on to win the election with 51% of the vote. Husain Alting Sjah of the Indonesian Democratic Party of Struggle (PDI-P), the titular Sultan of Tidore and a former Senator, placed second with 24%.

== Electoral system ==
The election, like other local elections in 2024, follow the first-past-the-post system where the candidate with the most votes wins the election, even if they do not win a majority. It is possible for a candidate to run uncontested, in which case the candidate is still required to win a majority of votes "against" an "empty box" option. Should the candidate fail to do so, the election will be repeated on a later date.

== Candidates ==
According to electoral regulations, in order to qualify for the election, candidates were required to secure support from a political party or a coalition of parties controlling nine seats (20 percent of all seats) in the North Maluku Regional House of Representatives (DPRD). As no parties won nine or more seats in the 2024 legislative election, parties are required to form coalitions in order to nominate a candidate. Candidates may alternatively demonstrate support to run as an independent in form of photocopies of identity cards, but no independent candidates registered prior to the deadline set by the General Elections Commission (KPU).

The previously elected governor, Abdul Ghani Kasuba, had served two terms and was therefore ineligible to run in the election. He was also arrested by the Corruption Eradication Commission in December 2023.

=== Potential ===
The following are individuals who have either been publicly mentioned as a potential candidate by a political party in the DPRD, publicly declared their candidacy with press coverage, or considered as a potential candidate by media outlets:

- Aliong Mus (Golkar), two-term regent of Taliabu Island.
- Benny Laos, former regent of Morotai Island. (Deceased)
- Ahmad Hidayat Mus (Golkar), former regent of Sula Islands.
- Husain Syah, senator representing North Maluku and the titular Sultan of Tidore.
- Taufik Madjid, secretary-general of the Ministry of Villages, Development of Disadvantaged Regions, and Transmigration.

== Political map ==
Following the 2024 Indonesian legislative election, twelve political parties are represented in the North Maluku DPRD:

| Political parties | Seat count |
|---|---|
| Party of Functional Groups (Golkar) | 8 / 45 |
| Indonesian Democratic Party of Struggle (PDI-P) | 5 / 45 |
| NasDem Party | 5 / 45 |
| Prosperous Justice Party (PKS) | 5 / 45 |
| People's Conscience Party (Hanura) | 5 / 45 |
| National Awakening Party (PKB) | 4 / 45 |
| Great Indonesia Movement Party (Gerindra) | 4 / 45 |
| National Mandate Party (PAN) | 3 / 45 |
| Democratic Party (Demokrat) | 3 / 45 |
| Perindo Party | 1 / 45 |
| Crescent Star Party (PBB) | 1 / 45 |
| Garuda Party | 1 / 45 |

== Incidents ==
=== Death of Benny Laos ===
Six weeks before the election, Benny Laos, former Regent of Morotai Island and candidate for Governor, died after a speedboat explosion while campaigning in Taliabu Island on 12 October 2024. The explosion happened when Laos' speedboat Bela 72 was refueling in a regional port at Bobong, West Taliabu. As refueling commenced, a sudden explosion occurred and the speedboat caught fire. North Maluku Police clarified that Benny Laos was among a group of victims caught in the blast and he was among the six victims who died in this incident. Acting Governor of North Maluku Samsuddin Abdul Kadir and Minister of Home Affairs Tito Karnavian gave their condolences. However, there was suspicion arose surrounding the circumstances of Benny Laos' death with social media users questioning whether the cause was a genuine accident or an assassination attempt.

With existing electoral law in place, the coalition that nominated Benny Laos were allowed to name a replacement candidate in seven days after his death. The coalition that nominated Benny which includes NasDem, Demokrat, PPP, PKB, PAN, PSI, Gelora, and Labour nominated his widow, Sherly Tjoanda in his place. Her candidacy was confirmed by KPU on 24 October 2024.

=== Hate speech allegations ===
Husain Syah of Tidore was reported to the General Election Supervisory Agency (Bawaslu) for allegations of racism committed during the gubernatorial election debate held in Tidore. Husain Syah spoke in Tidore "'ifa no cou lada, lada ngone mancia ua" which translates to "Don't choose the Dutch, white people because they are not our people". The PDI-P, the party that nominated the Sultan of Tidore, defended his statement by saying Husain Syah was quoting Nuku of Tidore and clarified his speech as a warning to not compromise with outsiders and condemned anyone who is offended by the Sultan's words as outsiders while saying that they should broaden their point of view regarding to the quote.

== Results ==
| Candidate | Running mate | Party | Votes | % |
|---|---|---|---|---|
| Sherly Tjoanda | Sarbin Sehe | Independent | 359,416 | 51.68 |
| Husain Alting Sjah | Asrul Rasyid Ichsan | Indonesian Democratic Party of Struggle | 168,174 | 24.18 |
| Muhammad Kasuba | Basri Salama | Prosperous Justice Party | 91,297 | 13.13 |
| Aliong Mus | Sahril Thahir | Golkar | 76,605 | 11.01 |
| Total | | | 695,492 | 100.00 |
| Valid votes | | | 695,492 | 98.09 |
| Invalid votes | | | 13,571 | 1.91 |
| Total votes | | | 709,063 | 100.00 |
| Registered voters/turnout | | | 942,076 | 75.27 |
Source: KPU Maluku Utara

Candidate vote share by district
Husain–Asrul

Aliong–Sahril

Kasuba–Basri

Sherly–Sarbin

== Aftermath ==
Sherly Tjoanda and Sarbin Sehe won the election with 51%. Her victory was hailed as a historic win as she was the first Chinese Indonesian Protestant woman to be elected governor. She along with Hidayat Arsani who won the 2024 Bangka Belitung Islands gubernatorial election, and Ria Norsan who won the 2024 West Kalimantan gubernatorial election, created another historic milestone as the first Chinese Indonesians who were directly elected as Governor after failed attempts to reach this milestone by Basuki Tjahaja Purnama who contested the 2007 Bangka Belitung Islands gubernatorial election and the 2017 Jakarta gubernatorial election.
