= Laos (disambiguation) =

Laos is a country in southeast Asia.

Laos or LAOS may also refer to:

- Lao River, a river of southern Italy
- Laüs, an ancient Greek colony situated on the above river
- Vjosa, a river of Epirus
- Galangal, a.k.a. Laos, an oriental spice
- Popular Orthodox Rally, known as LAOS, Greek right-wing populist/nationalist political party
- Alpinia galanga, a plant in the ginger family
- Benny Laos (1972–2024), Indonesian politician
- Sherly Tjoanda Laos (born 1982), Indonesian politician
