= 2024 Bangka Belitung Islands gubernatorial election =

- 27 November 2024
- Turnout: 60.02%
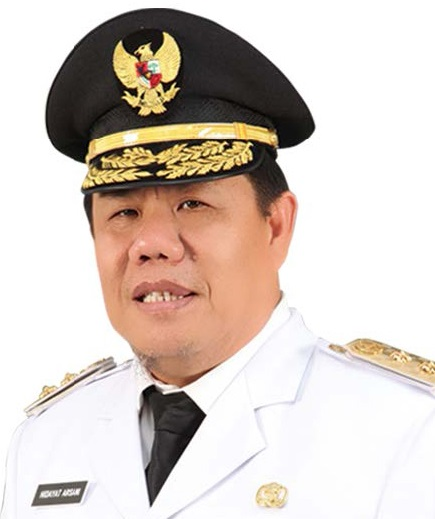

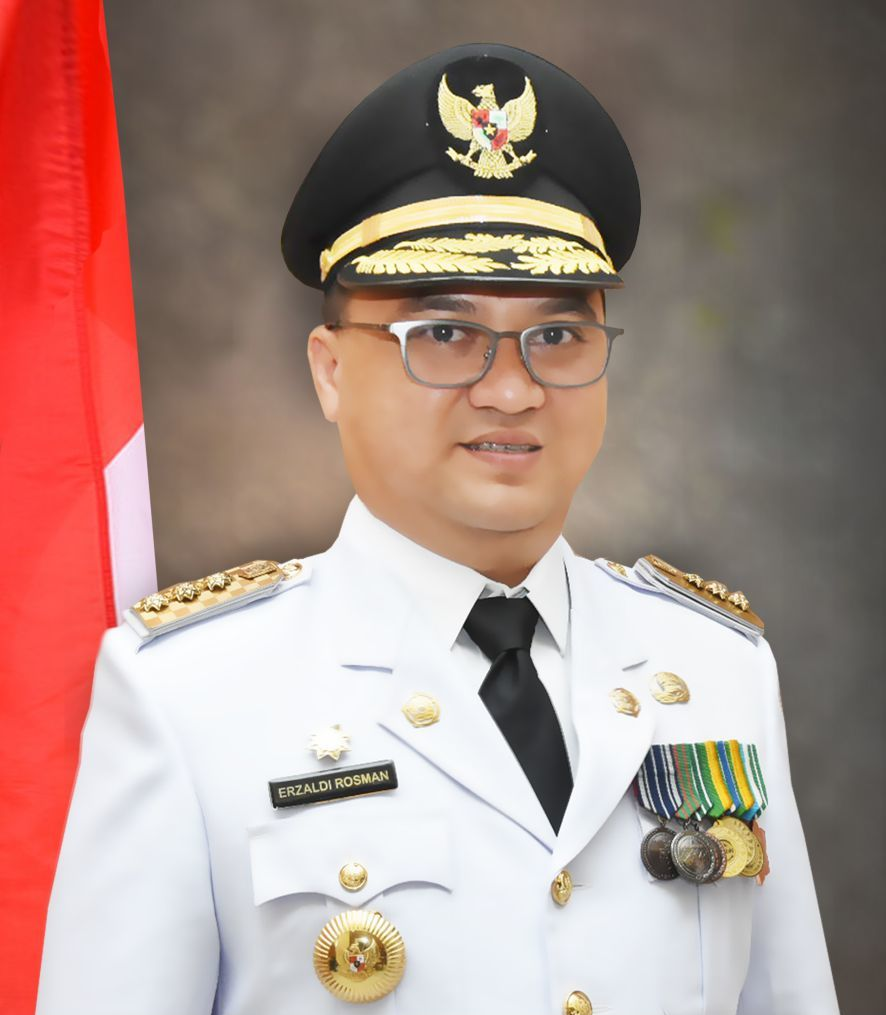
Candidate	Hidayat Arsani	Erzaldi Rosman Djohan
Party	Golkar	Gerindra
Alliance	–	KIM Plus
Running mate	Hellyana	Yuri Kemal Fadlullah
Popular vote	299,591	290,548
Percentage	50.77%	49.23%
- Results map by district (Interactive version)
Governor before election
Sugito (acting)
Independent
Elected Governor
Hidayat Arsani
Golkar

The 2024 Bangka Belitung Islands gubernatorial election was held on 27 November 2024 as part of nationwide local elections to elect the governor and vice governor of the Bangka Belitung Islands for a five-year term. The previous election was held in 2017. Former Vice Governor Hidayat Arsani of Golkar secured a narrow victory, receiving 50% of the vote. He defeated former Governor Erzaldi Rosman Djohan of the Gerindra Party, who received 49%.

== Electoral system ==
The election, like other local elections in 2024, follow the first-past-the-post system where the candidate with the most votes wins the election, even if they do not win a majority. It is possible for a candidate to run uncontested, in which case the candidate is still required to win a majority of votes "against" an "empty box" option. Should the candidate fail to do so, the election will be repeated on a later date.

== Candidates ==
According to electoral regulations, in order to qualify for the election, candidates were required to secure support from a political party or a coalition of parties controlling 9 seats (20 percent of all seats) in the Bangka Belitung Islands Regional House of Representatives (DPRD). The Indonesian Democratic Party of Struggle, which won 9 of 45 seats in the 2024 legislative election, is the only party eligible to nominate a candidate without forming a coalition with other parties. However, following a Constitutional Court of Indonesia decision in August 2024, the political support required to nominate a candidate was lowered to between 6.5 and 10 percent of the popular vote. Candidates may alternatively demonstrate support to run as an independent in form of photocopies of identity cards, which in Bangka Belitung Islands's case corresponds to 106,744 copies. No independent candidates registered with the General Elections Commission prior to the set deadline.

=== Declared ===
The following candidates qualified to contest the election:

1
Candidate from Gerindra and PBB
Erzaldi Rosman Djohan	Yuri Kemal Fadlullah
for Governor	for Vice Governor
Governor of Bangka Belitung Islands (2017–2022)	PBB Figure
Parties
19 / 45 (42%) PKB (2 seats); Gerindra (7 seats); Nasdem (6 seats); PBB (1 seat); Demokrat (3 seats)

2
Candidate from Golkar and PPP
Hidayat Arsani	Hellyana
for Governor	for Vice Governor
Vice Governor of Bangka Belitung Islands (2014–2017)	Member of DPRD Bangka Belitung Islands PPP
Parties
26 / 45 (58%) PDI-P (9 seats); Golkar (8 seats); PKS (6 seats); PPP (3 seats)

=== Potential ===
The following are individuals who have either been publicly mentioned as a potential candidate by a political party in the DPRD, publicly declared their candidacy with press coverage, or considered as a potential candidate by media outlets:

- Erzaldi Rosman Djohan (Gerindra), previous governor.
- Hidayat Arsani (Golkar), former vice governor.
- Naziarto, former provincial secretary.

== Political map ==
Following the 2024 Indonesian legislative election, nine political parties are represented in the Bangka Belitung Islands DPRD:

Political parties	Seat count
Indonesian Democratic Party of Struggle (PDI-P)	9 / 45
Party of Functional Groups (Golkar)	8 / 45
Great Indonesia Movement Party (Gerindra)	7 / 45
NasDem Party	6 / 45
Prosperous Justice Party (PKS)	6 / 45
United Development Party (PPP)	3 / 45
Democratic Party (Demokrat)	3 / 45
National Awakening Party (PKB)	2 / 45
Crescent Star Party (PBB)	1 / 45

== Results ==
Candidate	Running mate	Party	Votes	%
Hidayat Arsani	Hellyana	Golkar	299,591	50.77
Erzaldi Rosman Djohan	Yuri Kemal Fadlullah	Gerindra Party	290,548	49.23
Total			590,139	100.00
Valid votes			590,139	90.63
Invalid votes			61,030	9.37
Total votes			651,169	100.00
Registered voters/turnout			1,084,999	60.02
Source: KPU Kepulauan Bangka Belitung

== Aftermath ==
Hidayat Arsani, along with his running mate Hellyana, won the election with 50% of the vote. Hidayat Arsani and Ria Norsan, who won the 2024 West Kalimantan gubernatorial election, became the first Chinese Muslims to be elected governors in Indonesia. They, along with Sherly Tjoanda, who won the 2024 North Maluku gubernatorial election, created another historic milestone as the first Chinese Indonesians who were directly elected Governor after failed attempts to reach this milestone by Basuki Tjahaja Purnama, who contested the 2007 Bangka Belitung Islands and 2017 Jakarta gubernatorial elections.
