= Governor of Bangka Belitung Islands =

Head executive of Bangka Belitung Islands Province, Indonesia

Erzaldi Rosman Djohan has served as the governor of Bangka-Belitung Islands, Indonesia, since 2017.

#	Portrait	Name	Took office	Left office	Term	Note	Vice
—		Amur Muchasim	9 February 2001	22 April 2002	—	(Note: Acting Governor)	
1		Hudarni Rani	22 April 2002	26 April 2007	1		Suryadi Saman
2		Eko Maulana Ali	26 April 2007	26 April 2012	2		Syamsuddin Basari
2		Eko Maulana Ali	26 April 2012	30 July 2013	3	(Note: Died in Office)	Rustam Effendi
—		Rustam Effendi	12 August 2013	23 September 2013	3	(Note: Acting Governor)	—
3		Rustam Effendi	23 September 2013	26 April 2017	3		Hidayat Arsani
4		Erzaldi Rosman Djohan	12 May 2017	12 May 2022	4		Abdul Fatah
5		Hidayat Arsani	17 April 2025	present	5		Hellyana

== See also ==
- List of current provincial governors in Indonesia
