= List of current Indonesian governors =

The following is a list of current governors of the Indonesian provinces.

Indonesia is administratively divided into thirty-eight provincial-level subjects: twenty-nine regular provinces, seven special autonomous provinces (Aceh, Central Papua, Highland Papua, Papua, South Papua, Southwest Papua, West Papua), one special (istimewa) region (Special Region of Yogyakarta), and one special (khusus) region (the outgoing Special Capital Region of Jakarta). There is also one future provincial-level city (the future Capital City of Nusantara), which would officially become the 39th province after the enactment of a presidential decree on the new state capital.

The Capital City of Nusantara is headed by a national cabinet ministerial-level authority head appointed directly by the president, concurrently serving as governor for five-year terms independently from cabinet terms, and the province does not have a legislative body. While the Special Region of Yogyakarta has its own legislative body, the province is headed by the Sultan of Yogyakarta who reigns for life (divided into five-year terms for ceremonial purposes). Other provinces have their own local government, headed by a governor, and have their own legislative body. The governors and members of local representative bodies are elected by popular vote for five-year terms.

== Current ==
Note: Italic denotes acting/temporary/interim office holder(s).

Province	Photo	Governor	Party	Took office	End of term	Past governors
Aceh		Muzakir Manaf	Aceh Party	12 February 2025	12 February 2030	List
North Sumatra		Bobby Nasution	Gerindra	20 February 2025	20 February 2030	List
West Sumatra		Mahyeldi Ansharullah (2nd term) (Note: Has served continuously as governor since 25 February 2021)	PKS	20 February 2025	20 February 2030	List
Riau		Sofyan Hariyanto	Golkar	5 November 2025	20 February 2030	List
Riau Islands		Ansar Ahmad (2nd term) (Note: Has served continuously as governor since 25 February 2021)	Golkar	20 February 2025	20 February 2030	List
Jambi		Al Haris (2nd term) (Note: Has served continuously as governor since 7 July 2021)	PAN	20 February 2025	20 February 2030	List
South Sumatra		Herman Deru (2nd term)	NasDem	20 February 2025	20 February 2030	List
Bengkulu		Helmi Hasan	PAN	20 February 2025	20 February 2030	List
Bangka Belitung Islands		Hidayat Arsani	Golkar	17 April 2025	17 April 2030	List
Lampung		Rahmat Mirzani Djausal	Gerindra	20 February 2025	20 February 2030	List
Banten		Andra Soni	Gerindra	20 February 2025	20 February 2030	List
Jakarta, Special Capital Region		Pramono Anung	PDI-P	20 February 2025	20 February 2030	List
West Java		Dedi Mulyadi	Gerindra	20 February 2025	20 February 2030	List
Central Java		Ahmad Luthfi	Gerindra	20 February 2025	20 February 2030	List
Yogyakarta, Special Region		Hamengkubuwono X	Independent	10 October 2022 (Note: Has served as governor since 3 October 1998)	10 October 2027	List
East Java		Khofifah Indar Parawansa (2nd term)	PKB	20 February 2025	20 February 2030	List
Bali		I Wayan Koster (2nd term)	PDI-P	20 February 2025	20 February 2030	List
West Nusa Tenggara		Lalu Muhamad Iqbal	Gerindra	20 February 2025	20 February 2030	List
East Nusa Tenggara		Emanuel Melkiades Laka Lena	Golkar	20 February 2025	20 February 2030	List
West Kalimantan		Ria Norsan	Gerindra	20 February 2025	20 February 2030	List
Central Kalimantan		Agustiar Sabran	Gerindra	20 February 2025	20 February 2030	List
South Kalimantan		Muhidin	PAN	20 February 2025	20 February 2030	List
East Kalimantan		Rudy Mas'ud	Golkar	20 February 2025	20 February 2030	List
Nusantara, Capital City		Basuki Hadimuljono	Independent	5 November 2024 (Note: Has served as interim head of authority since 3 June 2024)	5 November 2029	List
North Kalimantan		Zainal Arifin Paliwang (2nd term) (Note: Has served continuously as governor since 15 February 2021)	Gerindra	20 February 2025	20 February 2030	List
West Sulawesi		Suhardi Duka	Demokrat	20 February 2025	20 February 2030	List
South Sulawesi		Andi Sudirman Sulaiman (2nd term)	Gerindra	20 February 2025	20 February 2030	List
Southeast Sulawesi		Andi Sumangerukka	Gerindra	20 February 2025	20 February 2030	List
Central Sulawesi		Anwar Hafid	Demokrat	20 February 2025	20 February 2030	List
Gorontalo		Gusnar Ismail (2nd term)	Demokrat	20 February 2025	20 February 2030	List
North Sulawesi		Yulius Selvanus	Gerindra	20 February 2025	20 February 2030	List
Maluku		Hendrick Lewerissa	Gerindra	20 February 2025	20 February 2030	List
North Maluku		Sherly Tjoanda	Demokrat	20 February 2025	20 February 2030	List
Southwest Papua		Elisa Kambu	Gerindra	20 February 2025	20 February 2030	List
West Papua		Dominggus Mandacan (2nd term)	NasDem	20 February 2025	20 February 2030	List
Central Papua		Meki Nawipa	PDI-P	20 February 2025	20 February 2030	List
South Papua		Apolo Safanpo	Golkar	20 February 2025	20 February 2030	List
Highland Papua		John Tabo	Golkar	17 April 2025	17 April 2030	List
Papua		Mathius Fakhiri	Golkar	8 October 2025	8 October 2030	List

== See also ==
- Provinces of Indonesia
