= Mandacan =

Mandacan is a Papuan surname. Notable people with the surname include:

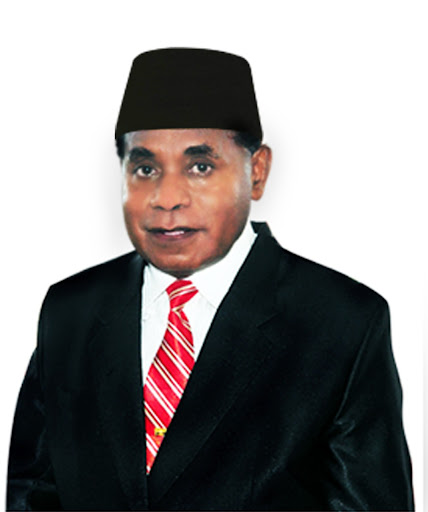
Nathaniel Mandacan

- Bernard Mandacan, Indonesian politician
- Dominggus Mandacan (born 1959), Indonesian politician
- Marinus Mandacan (born 1974), Indonesian politician
- Nataniel Mandacan (born 1962), Indonesian politician
