= Chuwit Chitsakul =

Thai businessman and politician

Chuwit Chitsakul (Thai: ชูวิทย์ จิตรสกุล) was a Thai businessman and politician.

== Personal life ==
Chuwit was born on the 22 October 1937. Chuwit received his accountancy degree from Chulalongkorn University. He is married to Sutraporn Chitsakul and owns automobile businesses in Phrae Province and Nan Province.

== Political career ==
Chuwit was a parliamentary candidate of the Ruam Thai Party and was elected to the House of Representatives of Thailand in 1988 as one of the representatives of Phrae Province after winning the by-election and served two terms in the House of Representatives of Thailand alongside Narong Wongwan who also represented Phrae and was the leader of the Ruam Thai Party (later renamed the Solidarity Party).

== Royal decorations ==
- Commander of The Most Noble Order of the Crown of Thailand
