= Sudin =

The name Sudin is a male name meaning good day, it originates from India and Bengal. Sudin is both a given name and a surname-. Notable people with the name include:

- Sudin Dhavalikar (born 21 November 1956), Indian politician
- Ahmad Lebai Sudin (born 1958), Malaysian politician
- Aleksandr Sudin (born 1950), Kazakhstani politician
- Elke Reva Sudin (born 1987), American painter
- Fahreza Sudin (born 2000), Indonesian footballer
- Jagataren Devi Sudin, Nepalese politician
