= Ngeow Sze Chan =

- Traditional Chinese: 饒師泉
- Simplified Chinese: 饶师泉
Transcriptions
Standard Mandarin
- Hanyu Pinyin: Ráo Shīquán
Southern Min
- Hokkien POJ: Jiâu Sai-chôaⁿ

On his conferment of the A.M.N. by the Yang di-Pertuan Agong of Malaysia (1996).

At dinner with Lee Kuan Yew.

At Age 21 (1936).

Dr. Ngeow Sze Chan (1915–2002) was a prominent Chinese physician based in Kuala Lumpur, Malaysia, during the mid to late 20th century. He was known in the region as “The Father of Modern Traditional Chinese Medicine” due to his influence on the practice.

At the age of 22, Ngeow Sze Chan graduated from the Shanghai College of Traditional Chinese Medicine (now known as Shanghai University of Traditional Chinese Medicine). A year later he immigrated to Kuala Lumpur where he started a TCM practice.

During his lifetime, Ngeow Sze Chan spearheaded a number of activities leading to the establishment of the following organizations:

1. The Selangor Chinese Medical Society (est. 1945).
2. The Central Malaysian Chinese Medical Association (est. 1948), now known as the Malaysian Chinese Medical Association.
3. The Chinese Medical Free Clinic (est. 1954, Kuala Lumpur). This clinic provides free consultation and medicine to the poor.
4. The Traditional Chinese Medical Institute of Malaysia (est. 1955). The mission of this institute is to train Chinese physicians to provide treatment for patients of the Chinese Medical Free Clinic. Ngeow Sze Chan was Dean of this institute until 1995.

His other philanthropic deeds include building a school (Yang Tao Xiao Xue) and a bridge (Golden Anniversary Bridge) in his native hometown of Yang Tao in the Guangdong province.

From 1948 to 1970 Ngeow Sze Chan was Chief Editor of the Medicine Weekly column for the China Press newspaper where he shared his medical experience with the public. He also served for many years as Voluntary Director of Chinese Medicine in Tung Shin Hospital . "A Collection of Ngeow Sze Chan’s Medical Writings” was published in commemoration of his 80th birthday by the Chinese Physicians’ Association of Malaysia.

Ngeow Sze Chan was married to Chong Show Mee (d. 1986, Malaysia). They had 5 sons, 3 daughters, 20 grandchildren and 23 great grandchildren.
