= Tuala Falani Chan Tung =

Ambassador to Belgium and the European Union

Tuala Falani Chan Tung is a Samoan diplomat and public servant. He served as Samoan Ambassador to Belgium and the European Union from 2005 to 2012.

Chan Tung commenced his schooling in Samoa and then pursued studies overseas where obtaining BA and MA degrees in Economics. He began work in the Department of Economic Development, which later became the Department of Trade, Commerce and Industry, eventually becoming its chief executive officer. Following a major restructuring, in which the Samoan government's 26 departments and ministries were reduced through mergers to 18, he stayed trade consultant for the Ministry of Foreign Affairs and Trade. In September 2005 he was appointed Ambassador to Belgium and the European Union, replacing the retiring H. E. Tauiliili William Meredith. As of 2020, he is on the board of the Central Bank of Samoa.

In November 2022 he was appointed chair of the Remuneration Tribunal.

Chan Tung got the matai title "Tuala" from the village of Leauvaa.
