= Hudarni Rani =

Indonesian politician (1950–2022)

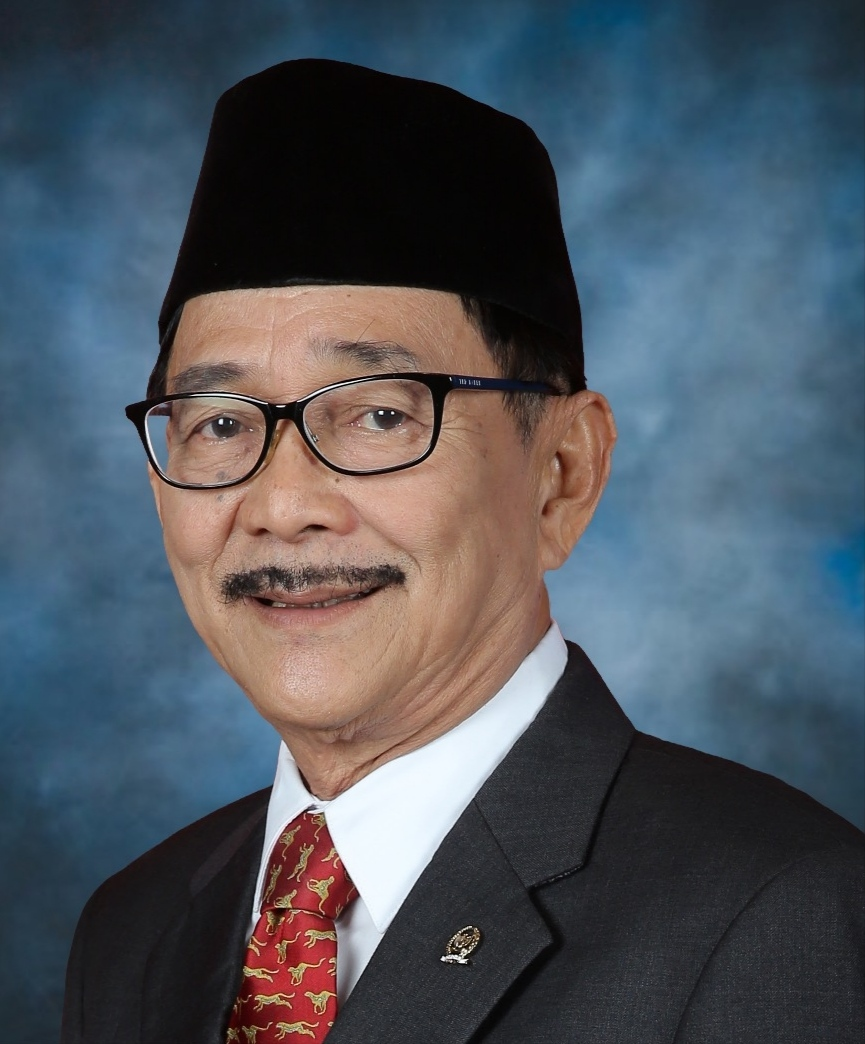

Indonesian Senator from Bangka-Belitung Islands
- In office 1 October 2014 – 8 April 2022

Governor of Bangka-Belitung Islands
- In office 22 April 2002 – 25 April 2007
- Preceded by: Amur Muchasim (acting)
- Succeeded by: Eko Maulana Ali

Member of Bangka-Belitung DPRD
- In office 1999–2002

Member of Pangkal Pinang City Council
- In office 1997–1999

Personal details
- Born: 20 November 1950; Sungailiat, Bangka-Belitung, Indonesia
- Died: 8 April 2022 (aged 71); Jakarta, Indonesia

Ahmad Hudarni Rani (20 November 1950 – 8 April 2022) was an Indonesian politician who was a member of the Regional Representative Council. Rani was the first elected Governor of Bangka-Belitung Islands, serving between 2002 and 2007.

== Biography ==
Rani was born in the town of Sungailiat in Bangka Regency on 20 November 1950. He went through his first twelve years of education there, before studying his higher education in Bandung.

In the 1980s, he worked in the tin mining company UPTB (today PT Timah). In 1997, he was elected speaker of Pangkal Pinang's city council. He later joined the provincial council (DPRD) of Bangka-Belitung and became its deputy speaker.

After winning a gubernatorial vote in the provincial council, he was sworn into office on 22 April 2002 as the province's first elected governor, with a delay caused by differences between the provincial and national regulations. His term expired and Eko Maulana Ali replaced him on 25 April 2007 after defeating Rani in the province's first direct gubernatorial election.

He was later elected as a member of the Regional Representative Council representing his home province and was sworn in on 1 October 2014.

Rani died on 8 April 2022 in his Jakarta apartment after suffering a suspected asthma attack.
