= Erzaldi Rosman Djohan =

Indonesian politician (born 1969)

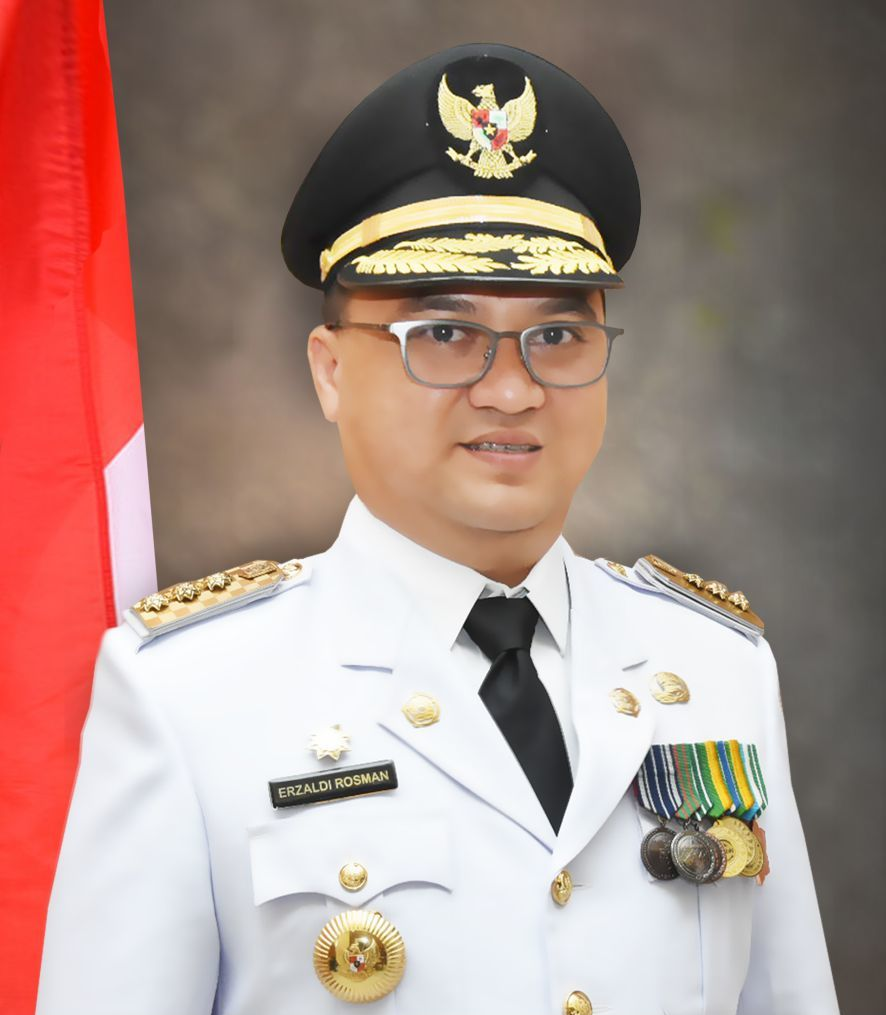

Governor of Bangka-Belitung Islands
- In office 12 May 2017 – 12 May 2022
- Deputy: Abdul Fatah
- Preceded by: Rustam Effendi
- Succeeded by: Ridwan Djamaluddin (acting); Hidayat Arsani

Regent of Central Bangka
- In office 17 February 2016 – 12 May 2017
- Governor: Rustam Effendi
- Deputy: Ibnu Saleh
- Preceded by: Sunardi (acting)
- Succeeded by: Ibnu Saleh
- In office 24 September 2010 – 24 September 2015
- Governor: Eko Maulana Ali; Rustam Effendi
- Deputy: Patrianusa Sjahrun
- Preceded by: Abu Hanifah
- Succeeded by: Sunardi (acting)

Vice Regent of Central Bangka
- In office 2005–2010
- Preceded by: Sunardi (acting)
- Succeeded by: Ibnu Saleh

Personal details
- Born: October 31, 1969 (age 56) Pangkal Pinang, Bangka Belitung, Indonesia
- Party: Gerindra (since 2016)
- Other political affiliations: Golkar (2001–2016)
- Spouse: Melati Erzaldi
- Children: Febryano Ammar Raffi; Nakita Phedra Khoirunisa; Tabina Azka Zafirah
- Parents: Rosman Djohan (father); Norma Idroes (mother)
- Relatives: Herry Erfian (brother)
- Education: IPDN
- Occupation: Politician

Erzaldi Rosman Djohan (born 31 October 1969) is an Indonesian politician who served as the governor of Bangka-Belitung Islands from 2017 to 2022. Prior to becoming governor, he was elected two times as the regent of Central Bangka Regency.

== Early life and education ==
Djohan was born on 31 October 1969 in Pangkal Pinang (then part of South Sumatra province) from Rosman Djohan and Norma Idroes. He completed his high school education in Pangkal Pinang, before moving to Jakarta, earning a diploma in 1994 from Tarumanegara University. Later, he also obtained a bachelor's degree and masters from an economics institute.

== Career ==
Before entering politics, Djohan worked at several companies, including a property company between 1999 and 2005. In 2004, he was elected to Bangka-Belitung's Regional House of Representatives (DPRD) as part of Golkar, though he only held the seat until 2005 when he was elected as Central Bangka's vice-regent. In 2010, he was elected regent, and was elected for his second term in 2015 with 57.1% of votes. His first term expired on 24 September 2015, before he was sworn in for a second term on 17 February 2016.

Djohan declared his candidacy for the governorship of the province in August 2016. By then, he had moved to Gerindra, and became the chairman of its provincial branch. In the following 2017 gubernatorial election, Djohan won 38.9% (213,442) of votes in a four-way election, defeating incumbent governor Rustam Effendi.

In 2024, Djohan is running for Governor of Bangka Belitung for the second term with a pair Yuri Kemal Fadlullah, who is the son of the Leader of the Crescent Star Party and former Minister of Law and Legislation, Minister of Justice and Human Rights and State Secretary of Indonesia Yusril Ihza Mahendra.

=== Governorship ===
On 12 May 2017, Djohan was sworn in as governor. Months after his inauguration, Djohan declared a moratorium on issuing new tin mining licenses in the province, intended to tackle illegal mining on the island and allow the provincial government to develop new regulations on ecologically friendly mining practices. He noted his intentions in an interview with Jakarta Globe to move away from tin mining, and develop tourism and metallurgical industries such as thorium extraction.

Alongside South Sumatra governor Herman Deru, Djohan has supported a bridge spanning the Bangka Strait, connecting Bangka Island with mainland Sumatra.

== Honours ==
- Lencana Melati Pramuka
- Lencana Darma Bakti Pramuka
- Satyalancana Pembangunan - 2019
- Satyalancana Karya Satya
