= Rudy Chua =

Indonesian politician

Rudy Chua (born 3 October 1970) is an Indonesian politician and legislator who has served five consecutive terms as a member of the Regional People's Representative Council (DPRD) for the Riau Islands Province (Kepri). He is a prominent cadre of the People's Conscience Party (Partai Hati Nurani Rakyat, Hanura).

== Early life and education ==
Rudy Chua was born in Tanjungpinang City. He is married and follows the Buddhist faith.

He pursued the following education:

- High School (SMA): He graduated from SMAN 1 Tanjungpinang in 1990.
- Bachelor of Economics (S.E.): He graduated from the Faculty of Economics at Trisakti University in Jakarta, studying from 1990 to 1994.
- Master of Law (M.H.): He obtained his post-graduate degree from Universitas Internasional Batam, completing his studies between 2013 and 2015.

== Honors ==
In recognition of his social and humanitarian work, Rudy Chua was awarded a high distinction from the Indonesian government:

- Satyalancana Kebaktian Sosial: He received the Social Service Meritorious Medal (Satyalancana Kebaktian Sosial) from the President of Indonesia, Joko Widodo. The award was presented by Vice President Ma'ruf Amin in Banjarmasin, South Kalimantan on 20 December 2019, during the commemoration of National Social Solidarity Day.

== Political career and focus ==
Rudy Chua commenced his career in elective politics in 2004.

=== Mayoral Election Attempt ===
In the 2013 local elections (Pilkada) for the city of Tanjungpinang, Rudy Chua ran as a candidate for Vice Mayor of Tanjungpinang on a ticket with mayoral candidate Husnizar Hood. They were defeated by the winning ticket of Lis Darmansyah and Syahrul.

=== DPRD Tenure and Legislative Role ===
Rudy Chua has served five consecutive periods in the DPRD, making him one of the longest-serving legislators in the province. His most recent election, the 2024–2029 term, saw him re-elected with the highest individual vote count in his district, Kepri I (Tanjungpinang).

He consistently serves on Commission II of the DPRD, which is responsible for economy, finance, and tourism. His advocacy in the area of public utilities, particularly water and electricity in the Bintan Island region, has earned him the nicknames "electric man and water man". His legislative work has included:

- Water Management: Advocating for the provincial government to expand water coverage and maximize the use of infrastructure like Waduk Kawal to increase household connections.
- Economic Services: Reviewing public works projects (like the Batu 12 flood polder) and checking the efficiency of public service centres (like the Mal Pelayanan Publik in Tanjungpinang) to ensure effective delivery.
