= Benny Laos =

Indonesian businessman and politician (1972-2024)

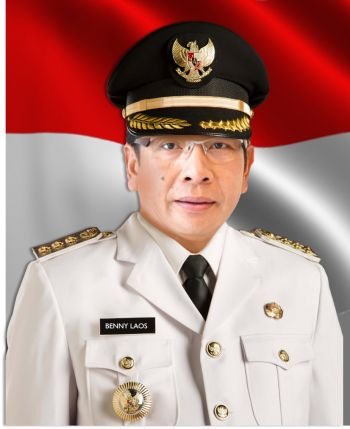
- Official portrait, 2017

Regent of Morotai
- In office 22 May 2017 – 22 May 2022
- Governor: Abdul Ghani Kasuba; Bambang Hermawan (acting)
- Deputy: Asrun Padoma
- Preceded by: Rusli Sibua; Samsuddin Abdul Kadir (acting)
- Succeeded by: Muhammad Umar Ali (acting)

Personal details
- Born: 8 August 1972 Ternate, North Maluku Regency, Indonesia
- Died: 12 October 2024 (aged 52) Bobong Port, Taliabu Island, North Maluku, Indonesia
- Party: Demokrat
- Spouse: Sherly Tjoanda (m. 2005–2024)
- Children: 3
- Occupation: Politician, businessman

Benny Laos (8 August 1972 – 12 October 2024) was an Indonesian politician and businessman who served as the Regent of Morotai from 2017 to 2022. He was a candidate for Governor of North Maluku in the 2024 election but died in a speedboat accident shortly before the election. His wife, Sherly Tjoanda, subsequently took over his candidacy and won the election, becoming the first female governor of North Maluku.

== Political career ==
Benny Laos served as the Regent of Morotai, an island regency in North Maluku, from 2017 to 2022. In 2024, he ran as a candidate for Governor of North Maluku, supported by a coalition of eight political parties, including NasDem, PKB, Democrats, PAN, PPP, Gelora, PSI, and the Labor Party. His running mate was Sarbin Sehe, a former official at the local religious affairs office.

== Death ==
On 12 October 2024, Laos was killed in a speedboat accident at Bobong Port in Taliabu Island Regency, North Maluku. The speedboat, named Bella 72, caught fire and exploded while refueling, resulting in the deaths of six passengers, including Benny Laos, and injuring ten others, among them his wife, Sherly Tjoanda. Following his death, his widow Sherly Tjoanda replaced him as the gubernatorial candidate and won the election.

== Personal life ==
Benny Laos was married to Sherly Tjoanda on 28 May 2005 until his death in 2024. They had three children: Edbert (born 11 March 2006), Edelyn (born 18 April 2007), and Edrick (born 8 July 2009). Before entering politics, Benny Laos was a businessman.
