= Hidayat Arsani =

Indonesian businessman and politician

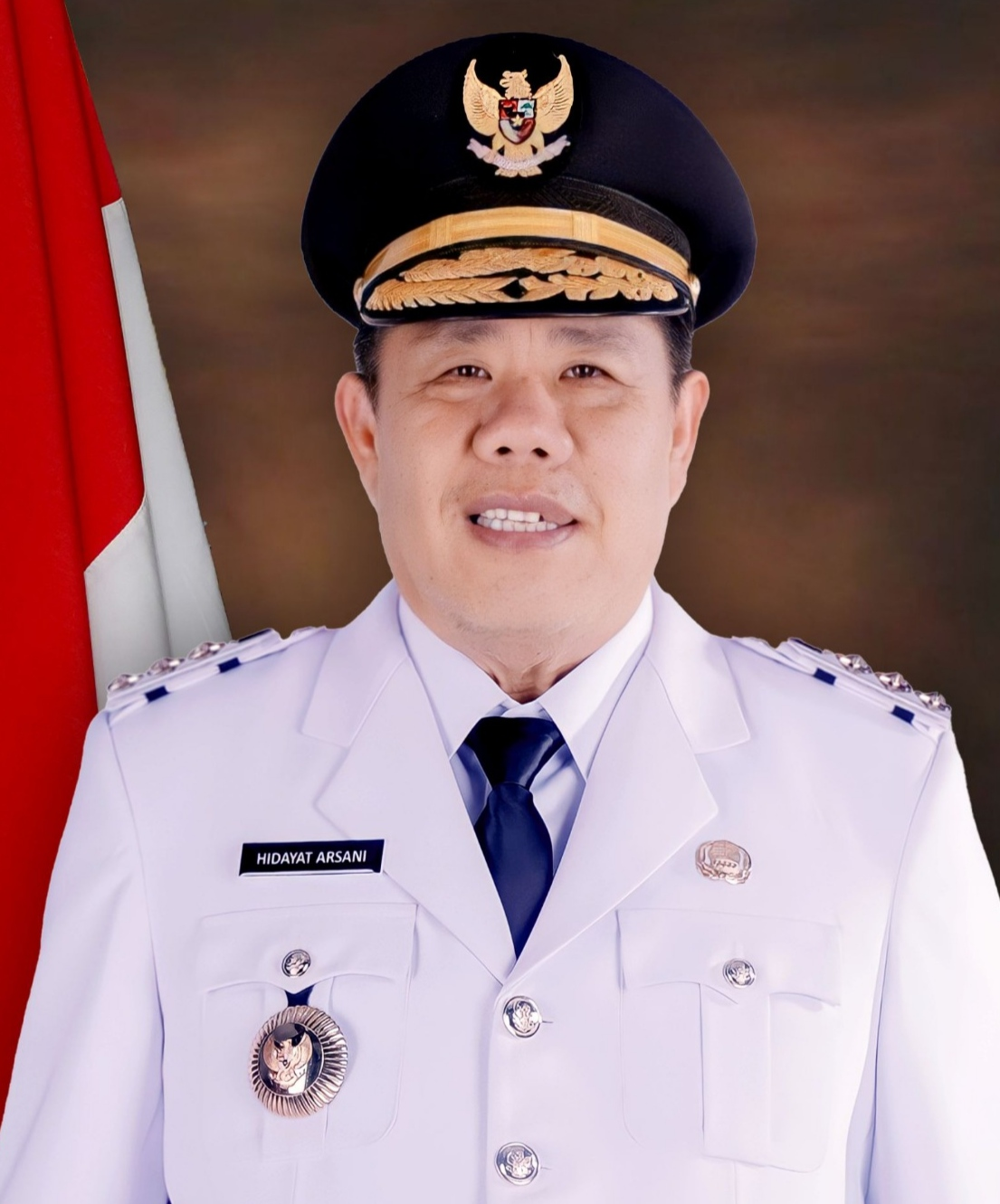
- Arsani as governor

Governor of Bangka Belitung Islands
- Incumbent
- Assumed office 17 April 2025
- Vice Governor: Hellyana
- Preceded by: Sugito (act.); Erzaldi Rosman Djohan

Vice Governor of Bangka Belitung Islands
- In office 12 May 2014 – 12 May 2017
- Governor: Rustam Effendi
- Preceded by: Rustam Effendi
- Succeeded by: Abdul Fatah

Personal details
- Born: 21 August 1963 (age 63) Pangkal Pinang, South Sumatra, Indonesia
- Party: Golkar
- Spouse: Ni Komang Widari
- Children: Hendra Erwanto; Hary Iswanto; Handy Hidayat; Hery Wijaya; Haikal Zulpika; M Habibi
- Education: STIE IBEK Pangkal Pinang

Hidayat Arsani (born 21 August 1963) is an Indonesian businessman and politician of the Golkar party who is the governor of the Bangka Belitung Islands. He had previously served as vice governor under Rustam Effendi from 2014 to 2017.

== Early life ==
Hidayat Arsani was born on 21 August 1963 in Pangkal Pinang. He is of Chinese descent. His birth parents dumped him in a trash can, and he was adopted by the couple Arsani and Muhaya. He completed high school in 1984 at Pangkal Pinang.

== Career ==
Arsani became an influential businessman in Bangka Belitung, with interests in shrimp farming, tin mining, hospitals, and schools. His companies are grouped under the Arsani Group. He also founded the daily newspaper Rakyat Pos in 2003. In 2012, he received an award from governor Eko Maulana Ali for contributions to provincial development. He had also served as chairman of the Indonesian Tin Association and the provincial branch of the Indonesian Journalists Association. In 2020, he began cultivating sugar palm plantations in the province.

=== Politics ===
In 2013, sitting governor of Bangka Belitung Eko Maulana Ali died in the middle of his term, and when his vice governor Rustam Effendi succeeded him, Arsani was elected by the provincial legislature to become Effendi's vice governor. At the time, he was chairman of Golkar's provincial branch in Bangka Belitung. He was sworn in as vice governor on 12 May 2014. He ran for governor in the 2017 Bangka Belitung Islands gubernatorial election, winning 105,567 votes (19.26%) and placing third out of four candidates with Erzaldi Rosman Djohan being elected governor. He ran for governor again in the 2024 gubernatorial election, defeating incumbent Djohan after winning 299,591 votes (50.77%).

== Family ==
He is married to Ni Komang Widari (b. 1987), and the couple has five children.
