= Eko Maulana Ali =

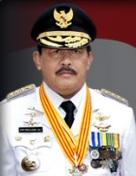

Governor of Bangka Belitung
- In office April 2007 – July 2013
- Preceded by: Hudarni Rani
- Succeeded by: Rustam Effendi

Personal details
- Born: 26 September 1951 Kelapa, Bangka Belitung, Indonesia
- Died: 30 July 2013 (aged 61) Jakarta, Indonesia
- Party: Golkar
- Spouse: Noorhari Astuti

Eko Maulana Ali (26 September 1951 – 30 July 2013) was the governor of Bangka Belitung from April 2007 until his death in July 2013.

In the 2007, Bangka Belitung Regional Election, he fought with the former Regent of East Belitung, Basuki Tjahaja Purnama, who he later defeated. He also served as Regent of Bangka Regency. In the 2012, Eko again run as a candidate for Governor of Bangka Belitung 2012 to 2017 by accompanying Member of Bangka Belitung Regional People's Representative Council Rustam Effendi supported by the Party of Functional Groups (Golkar), Indonesian Democratic Party of Struggle (PDI-P), and Prosperous Justice Party (PKS). With the results of this recapitulation, Eko and Rustam became Governor and Deputy Governor of Bangka Belitung 2012-2017.

== Death ==
Eko died on 30 July 2013, aged 61, from complications of kidney disease in MMC Hospital, Jakarta. Eko's second inauguration as Governor of Bangka Belitung was only held in April 2012. Over the past year, leadership in Bangka Belitung was handed over to the Deputy Governor of Bangka Belitung, Rustam Effendi to continue his remaining time as Governor.
