= Abdul Ghani Kasuba =

Indonesian politician (1951–2025)

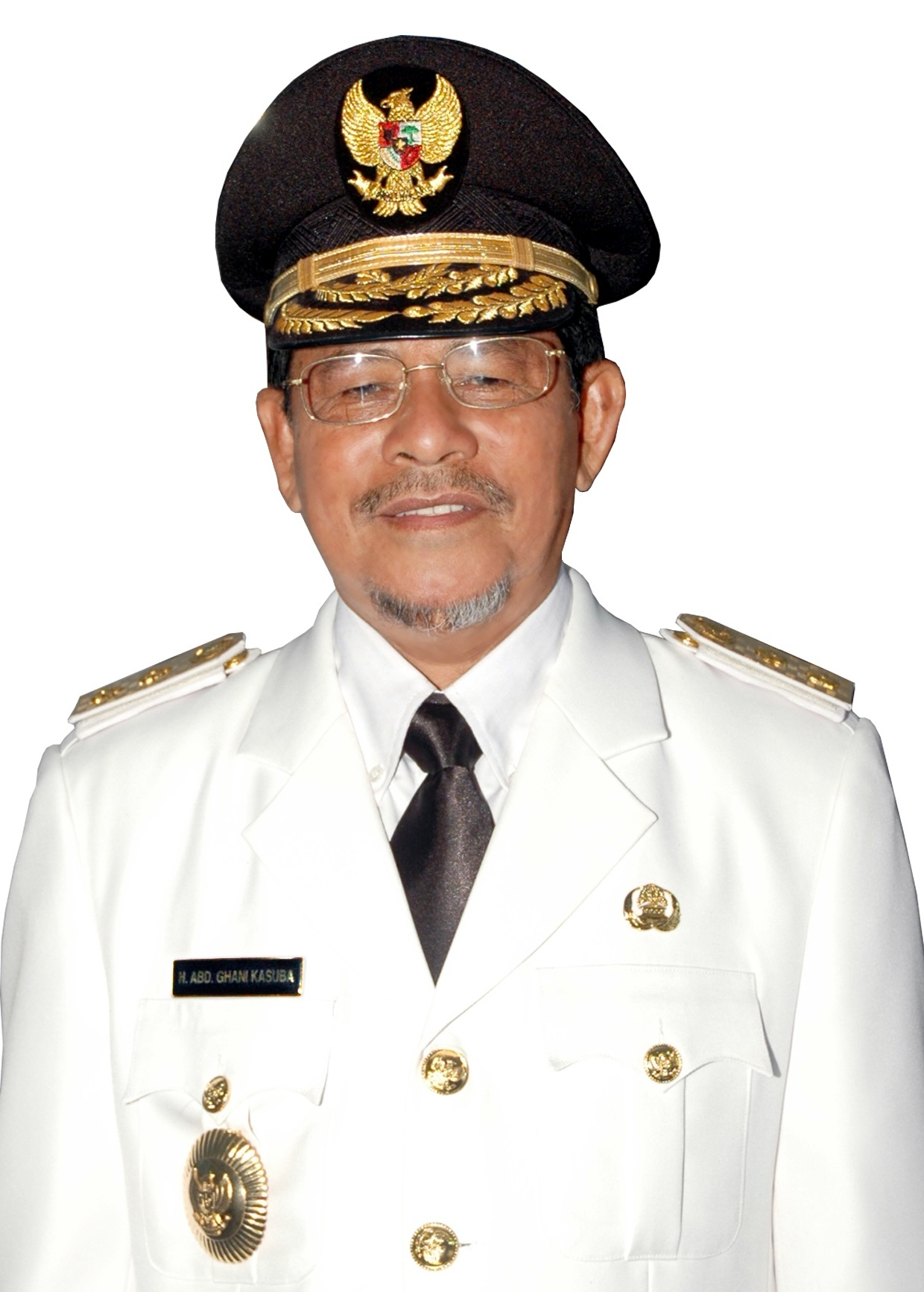

Governor of North Maluku
- In office 10 May 2019 – 20 December 2023
- Deputy: Al Yasin Ali
- Preceded by: Bambang Hermawan (acting)
- Succeeded by: Al Yasin Ali (acting)
- In office 5 May 2014 – 5 May 2019
- Deputy: Muhammad Natsir Thaib
- Preceded by: Tanribali Lamo (acting)
- Succeeded by: Bambang Hermawan (acting)

Personal details
- Born: 21 December 1951 Bacan Islands, South Halmahera Regency, North Maluku, Indonesia
- Died: 14 March 2025 (aged 73) Ternate, North Maluku, Indonesia
- Citizenship: Indonesian
- Spouse: Faoniah Hi Djaohar
- Children: Muhammad Thariq Kasuba; Nazlatan Ukhra Kasuba; Aminatuz Zahrah Kasuba; Nurul Izzah Kasuba
- Education: Islamic University of Madinah
- Occupation: Politician

Abdul Ghani Kasuba (21 December 1951 – 14 March 2025) was an Indonesian politician and the governor and lieutenant governor of North Maluku.

Kasuba denoted South Halmahera Regency as a region he wanted to develop as the province's tourism hub. In 2017, he inaugurated the Widi International Fishing Tournament as one of those ways.

After visiting representatives of the Jinchun Group in Guangzhou, Kasuba successfully negotiated for the group to build a nickel smelter on Obira in the Obi Islands. He was later arrested on 20 December 2023 due to a corruption case.

Kasuba died in Ternate, North Maluku, Indonesia on 14 March 2025, at the age of 73.

== Corruption case ==
On 18 December 2023, Kasuba was arrested by the Corruption Eradication Commission (KPK) during a sting operation. He was transported back to Jakarta for interrogation and subsequently detained by the KPK. Kasuba, along with 18 other North Maluku provincial officials, faced allegation of receiving substantial funds from Infrastructure projects in the province with budget surpassing 500 billion rupiahs.

In the course of this operation, KPK confiscated cash totaling 725 million rupiahs as part of the suspected 2.2 billion rupiahs. Kasuba stood accused of his involvement in corrupt practices related to bidding processes for positions and the procurement of goods and services.
