= Sherly Tjoanda =

Indonesian politician (born 1982)

Sherly Tjoanda Laos
- 蔡任珍
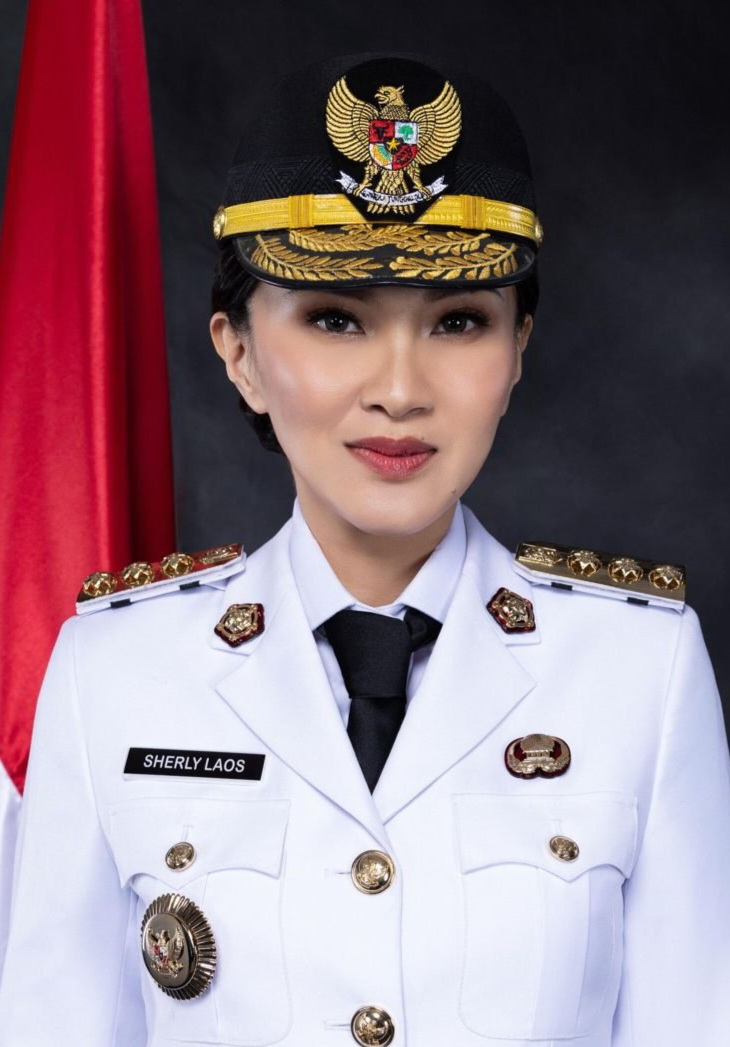
- Official portrait, 2025

Governor of North Maluku
- Incumbent
- Assumed office 20 February 2025
- Deputy: Sarbin Sehe
- Preceded by: Abdul Ghani Kasuba; Samsuddin Abdul Kadir (acting)

Head of Family Welfare Empowerment of Morotai Island Regency
- In office 22 May 2017 – 22 May 2022
- Preceded by: Hikmah Rusli Sibua
- Succeeded by: Nurlela Muhammad Umar Ali (acting)

Personal details
- Born: Sherly Tjoanda; 12 August 1982 (age 44) Ambon, Maluku, Indonesia
- Party: Democratic
- Spouse: Benny Laos (m. 2005; died 2024)
- Children: 3
- Parents: Paulus Tjoanda (father); Maria Margaretha Liem (mother)
- Education: Petra University, Inholland University
- Occupation: Politician, businesswoman

Sherly Tjoanda Laos (Chinese: 蔡任珍; pinyin: Cài Rènzhēn; Pe̍h-ōe-jī: Chhòa Līm-tin; born 12 August 1982) is an Indonesian politician who has served as the Governor of North Maluku since 20 February 2025. She is the first female governor of the province, having been elected in 2024 following the death of her husband, Benny Laos, who was a gubernatorial candidate.

== Early life and education ==
Sherly Tjoanda was born on 12 August 1982, in Ambon, Maluku, to Paulus Tjoanda and Maria Margaretha Liem. She is of Chinese descent, with Hakka maternal lineage. She pursued her undergraduate studies at Petra University in Surabaya, majoring in International Business Management, and later earned a master's degree from Inholland University, Netherlands.

== Career ==
Prior to her political career, Tjoanda was actively involved in several organizations. She served as the Chair of the TP PKK (Family Welfare Movement) in Morotai from 2017 to 2022. She also chaired the Bela Peduli Foundation, which supports social initiatives such as aid for orphans, and was engaged with the Indonesian Farmers' Harmony Association. In addition, she held the position of Director at PT Bela Group, a company she co-developed with her husband.

== Political career ==
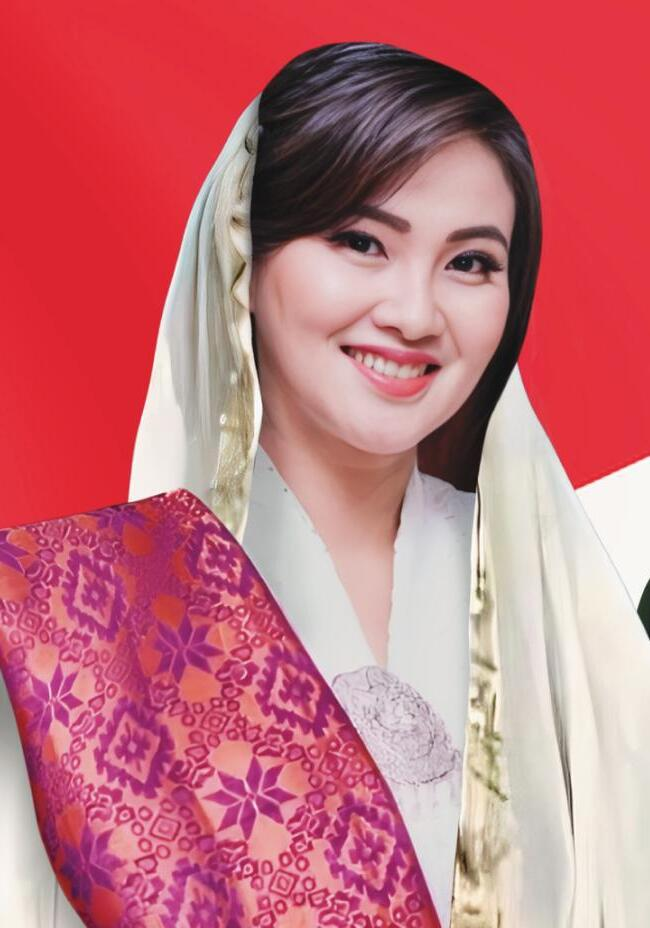
Tjoanda in 2024

In 2024, Tjoanda entered politics following the death of her husband, Benny Laos, in a speedboat accident on 12 October 2024. Originally a gubernatorial candidate, Laos's passing led a coalition of eight political parties—including NasDem, PKB, Democrats, PAN, PPP, Gelora, PSI, and the Labour Party—to nominate Tjoanda as his replacement. Running with Sarbin Sehe as her deputy, she won the election with 50.73% of the vote based on preliminary counts, defeating competitors including incumbent figures. She was inaugurated as Governor of North Maluku on 20 February 2025, as the province’s first female governor.

== Controversies ==
In November 2025, Tempo magazine reported that Tjoanda is listed as the largest shareholder of PT Karya Wijaya inherited from her late husband Benny Laos, whose remaining shares are also held by their three children. PT Karya Wijaya initially owned a concession on Gebe, Central Halmahera Regency, covering an area of 500 hectares and a nickel production operation mining business permit number 502/34/DPMPTSP/XII/2020 valid until 4 December 2040. Later, the company expanded its concession area from Central Halmahera Regency to East Halmahera Regency with a nickel production operation mining business permit number 04/1/IUP/PMDN/2025 covering an area of 1,145 hectares. The mining business permit came into effect on 17 January 2025, coinciding with the momentum of the North Maluku gubernatorial election. Met separately, two people familiar with mining activities in North Maluku said there were allegations that PT Karya Wijaya's mining permit was issued without going through the applicable mechanisms. Another problem is that the company is suspected of not having paid the reclamation guarantee in Gebe and has not built a sediment embankment, which has turned the sea water red. In the previous year, the North Maluku High Prosecutor's Office had investigated alleged corruption in the issuance process of 22 mining business permits. The case relates to permits issued during the transfer of licensing authority from the district or city government to the province in 2016 and from the provincial government to the central government in 2019. Of the 22 mining business permits that are suspected of being problematic, two of them belong to PT Karya Wijaya and PT Bela Kencana, companies owned by Laos and PT Bela Group. Prosecutors have questioned several people in this case, but there has been no further action. The Head of the Legal Information Section of the North Maluku High Prosecutor's Office, Richard Sinaga, has not yet responded to inquiries regarding developments in the case. The Head of the Licensing Section of the North Maluku Investment and One-Stop Integrated Services Agency, Muttaqin, stated that the mining business permits issued by the provincial government were based on complete administrative documents. He stated that so far there have been no issues with the permits of mining companies affiliated with Tjoanda. "Regarding the environmental impact analysis, you can ask the relevant agency," Muttaqin said. The Secretary General of the Ministry of Forestry, Mahfudz, confirmed that the 500 hectares of land listed in the mining business permit document belonging to PT Karya Wijaya in the forest area already have a forest area borrow-to-use permit. This is in accordance with Decree of the Minister of Environment and Forestry Number 1348 of 2024 dated 27 September 2024. Meanwhile, the 1,145-hectare mining concession area is suspected of not having received a forest area borrow-to-use permit. "But we are currently in the process of determining the boundaries of the work area," he said. On 19 November, Tjoanda spoke out about allegations of owning an illegal mining company. She admitted to having demanded accountability from several company managements, one of which was PT Karya Wijaya, which holds a mining concession in her area. According to Tjoanda, the company management denied the permit issues. They also claimed the company's permits were complete. "PT Karya Wijaya also only started operating in August 2025," she said. However, Tjoanda admitted that she was no longer an active manager at the family-owned company long before her gubernatorial candidacy. She had resigned from that position a month before being inaugurated as governor, then delegated professionals to manage the company. By law, Tjoanda said, officials cannot be active managers of a company, but they can be shareholders. "So there is no conflict of interest here," she said. Currently, as governor, her duty is to oversee and report to the relevant ministries if there are mining problems. In addition, the governor is also tasked with providing recommendations for the issuance of mining business permits. "But to this day, I have not issued a single recommendation regarding mining business permits," said Tjoanda.

On 3 March 2026, The Forest Area Regulation Task Force is investigating alleged violations by her mining company, PT Karya Wijaya, and is verifying the company's operations. "The process is still ongoing; there are no final results yet due to discrepancies in the verification data, which will be announced in due course," said Barita Simanjuntak, spokesperson for the Forest Area Regulation Task Force. He confirmed that the Forest Area Regulation Task Force is working in accordance with applicable laws and regulations. Therefore, all actions taken are solely for the sake of regulation. Simanjuntak also stated that the Forest Area Regulation Task Force is still verifying and collecting data on mining operations in North Maluku. In fact, verification is being carried out in 14 provinces and 30 regencies/cities, covering a total land area of 37,990,693 hectares. "In Southeast Sulawesi, Central Sulawesi, South Sulawesi, North Maluku, Papua, Bangka Belitung Islands, Gorontalo, North Sumatra, Maluku, and North Sulawesi," he said. According to Simanjuntak, there are 191 companies currently undergoing verification. The companies involved in the mining of nickel, coal, copper ore, gold, limestone, marble, quartz sand, iron ore, iron laterite, peridotite, and others. The alleged violations committed by PT Karya Wijaya were uncovered by the Mining Advocacy Network. The company, which operates on 51.3 hectares of land in Gebe, Central Halmahera Regency, and is owned by Tjoanda, was fined for illegal nickel mining activities.

== Personal life ==
Sherly Tjoanda was married to Benny Laos, a businessman who was the former regent of Morotai, from 2005 until his death in 2024. The couple had three children: Edbert, Edelyn, and Edrick.
