= Banka =

Banka, Banca or Bangka (Russian: банка, Azerbaijani: bankə) may refer to:

== Places ==
- Báng-kah khu, former name of Wanhua District in Taipei, Taiwan
- Banka or Bangka Island, an island between Sumatra and Singapore, see
- Banka, Bihar, a town and municipality in India
  - Banka Junction railway station
- Banka district in Bihar, India, with headquarters in Banka town
- Banka (Lok Sabha constituency) in Bihar
- Banka, Uttar Pradesh, a village in Uttar Pradesh, India
- Banka, Cameroon, a town
- Banka, Piešťany District, a village in the Trnava Region of Slovakia
- Bankə, a village and municipality in Azerbaijan also known as Banka

== People ==
- Bańka, a Polish surname
- Sant Banka, Maharashtran saint, and brother in law of Chokhamela

== See also ==
- Banca (disambiguation)
- Bangka (disambiguation)
- Banga (disambiguation)
- Banke (disambiguation)
