= Chinese in the Bangka Belitung Islands =

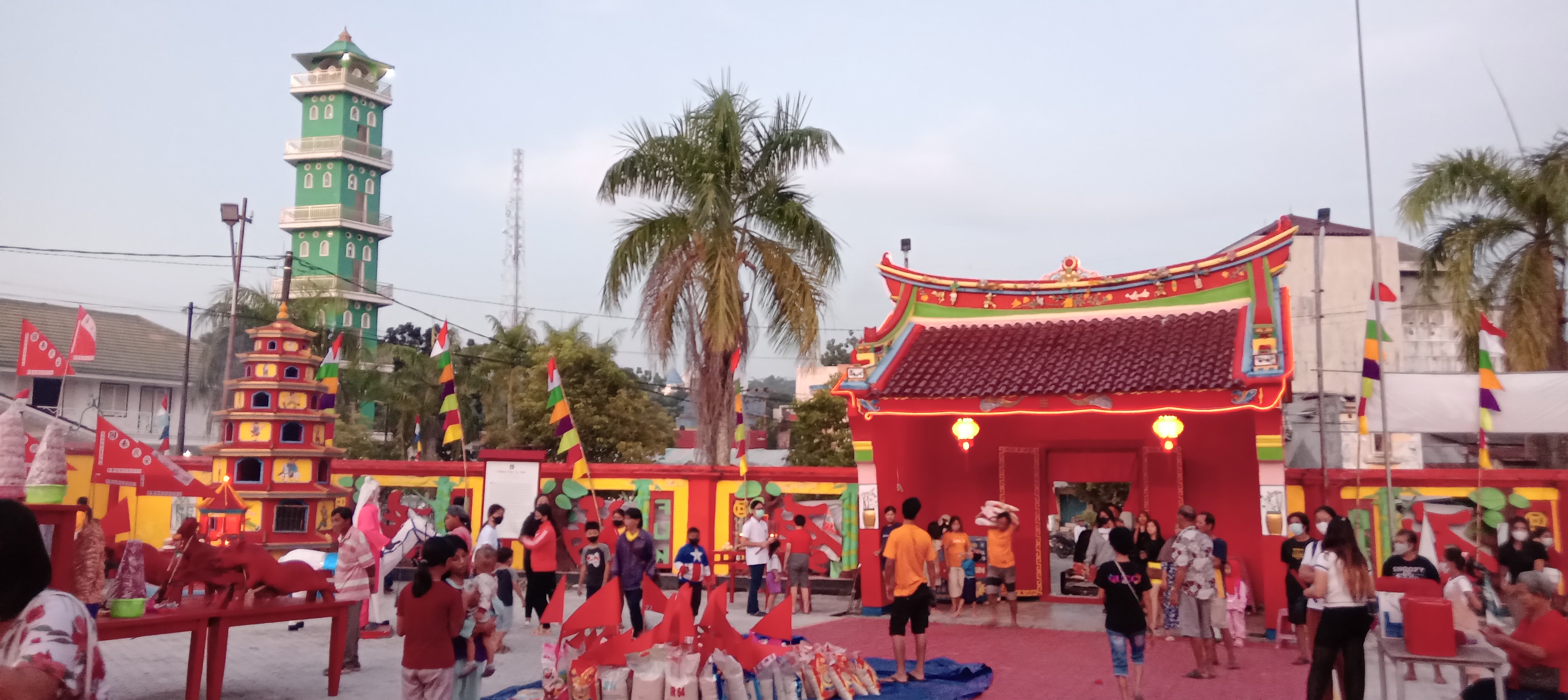
- Bangka Chinese people celebrating the Ghost Festival in the Kong fuk temple at Muntok

Regions with significant populations
- Indonesia
- Bangka Belitung Islands: 99,624 (2010 census)

Languages
- Hakka, Bangka Malay, Belitung Malay, Hokkien, Indonesian, Cantonese

Religion
- Chinese traditional religion, Buddhism, Christianity, Islam

Related ethnic groups
- Benteng Chinese, Peranakans, Bali Chinese, Maluku Chinese and other Chinese Indonesians

Chinese Indonesians have lived in Bangka Belitung Islands for centuries. Bangka Belitung is one of the regions with the largest Chinese population in Indonesia besides Java, Riau, North Sumatra and West Kalimantan.

Chinese immigrants came to the Bangka Belitung Islands in several waves during the 1700s and the 1800s. Many Hakkas from various parts of Guangdong came to the islands to work as tin miners.

Bangka Island Chinese is quite different from Belitung Island Chinese because the first Chinese generation who were entirely male and arrived in Bangka Island, left China without women, they took local women as wives, so many Chinese in Bangka had mixed blood (Peranakan), especially those who lived in the Eastern part of the island. Bangka Island Chinese language is a creole language mixed Malay and Hakka words. Belitung Chinese is considered purer (totok) because they were the first generation who arrived on the island, and they did so with Chinese wives after the 1800s. Although some town in Bangka Island, purer degree of Hakka can be heard as well, the Hakka-Malay mixture language is uniquely of Bangka Island Chinese. In Belitung, Chinese people adapted well with local culture. They changed their clothes and would like to wear Malay baju kurung with kebaya, pants with sarong. Hakka is spoken among the majority of Chinese speakers on the islands with a minority Hokkien-speaking population.

== Notable Chinese from Bangka Belitung ==
- Abraham Damar Grahita, Indonesian Basketball Player.
- Lim Tau Kian, Chinese-Muslim known for his contribution in first tin mining.
- Lim Boe Sing, businessman during East Indies period.
- Tjoeng A-tiam, Chinese Mayor of Mentok.
- Tan Hong Kwee, Kapitan Cina of Mentok (year 1832 – 1839).
- Tony Wen, born in Sungailiat, Indonesian independence activist.
- Basuki Tjahaja Purnama or Ahok, East Belitung Regent (2005 - 2006) and Governor of Jakarta (2014–2017).
- Basuri Tjahaja Purnama, Politician and businessman, former Regent of East Belitung (2010-2015)
- Myra Sidharta, writer and sinologist.
- Yap Yun Hap, University of Indonesia student, one of the victims of the Semanggi shootings
- Sunlie Thomas Alexander, writer and critic.
- Rudianto Tjen, politician, AKA Bacu.
- Hidayat Arsani, Vice Governor of Bangka Belitung Islands (2014-2017) and the current Governor of Bangka Belitung Islands (2025-2029).
- Bambang Patijaya, politician, Member of the House of Representatives (2019-present).
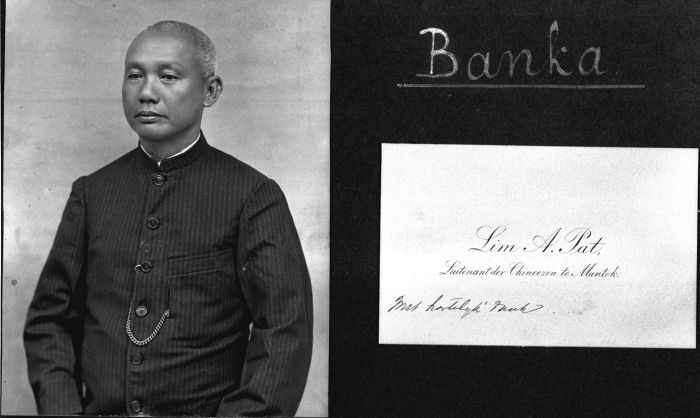
Lim A-pat

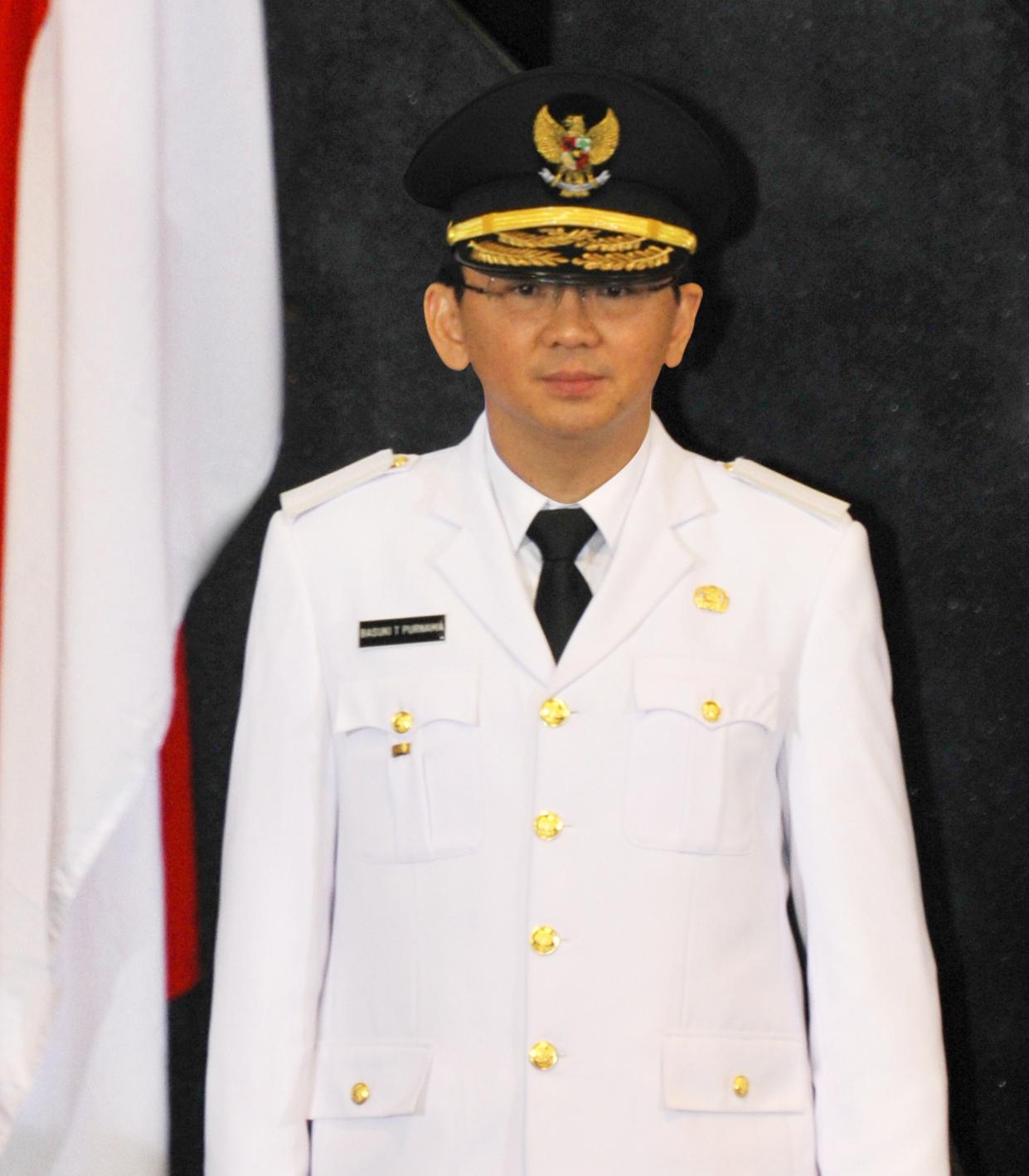
Basuki Tjahaja Purnama
