= Banga =

Banga may refer to:

== Arts and entertainment ==
- Banga (album), a 2012 album by Patti Smith
- A song by Ali Shaheed Muhammad from the 2004 album Shaheedullah and Stereotypes
- The name of Pontius Pilate's dog in Mikhail Bulgakov's novel The Master and Margarita
- BANGA, a collective of Angolan architects

== Food ==
- Banga (soup), a type of meat, fish and palm fruit soup from Southern Nigeria
- Agastache rugosa, a culinary herb known as banga in Korea

== Places ==
- Banga, Aklan, a municipality in the Philippines
- Banga, Angola, municipality in Angola
- Banga, Burkina Faso, a town in Burkina Faso
- Banga, Entebbe, Uganda
- Banga, India, a town and municipal council in Shahid Bhagat Singh Nagar district, Puniab, India
  - Banga Assembly Constituency
- Banga, Pakistan, a town in Faisalabad District, Punjab, Pakistan
- Banga, South Cotabato, a municipality in the Philippines
- Vanga Kingdom (also known as the Banga Kingdom), an ancient name for the region of Bengal in India and Bangladesh

== People ==
- Banga Sainis, a sub clan of Saini people
- Ajaypal Singh Banga, CEO of Mastercard
- Harindarpal Banga, Indian entrepreneur and philanthropist
- Mobutu Sese Seko Nkuku wa za Banga, Zairian politician and leader

== Other uses ==
- Banga (pottery), large earthen jars made in the Philippines
- Banga language, a language of Nigeria

== See also ==
- Banga, Punjab (disambiguation)
- Bangla (disambiguation)
- Bengal (disambiguation)
- Vanga (disambiguation)
- Paschimbanga or West Bengal, a state in eastern India
- Bangabhumi, a separatist movement in Bangladesh to create a Bengali Hindu country
- Bunga (disambiguation)
- Banka (disambiguation)
- Bangka (disambiguation)
