= Bańka =

Bańka is a Polish surname from a nickname for an obese, bulgy person (literal meaning: 'jar'). Notable people with the surname include:

- Piotr Bańka (born 1964), Polish politician
- Witold Bańka (born 1984), Polish sprinter and politician

== See also ==
- Banka (disambiguation)
