= Banke =

Banke may refer to:

- Banke District, a district in Nepal
- Bankə, a municipality in Azerbaijan
- Banke Bihari Temple, Hindu temple dedicated to Krishna in Vrindavan, India

The following people are called "Banke":

- Paul Banke (born 1964), American boxer
- Thomas Banke, English 16th-century Vice-Chancellor of Oxford University

== See also ==
- Banka (disambiguation)
