= Balinese Chinese =

Ethnic Chinese who live in Bali

Balinese Chinese Orang Tionghoa Bali 峇里島華人 巴厘島華人 ᬢᬶᬬᭀᬦ᭄ᬕ᭄ᬄᬯᬩᬮᬶ
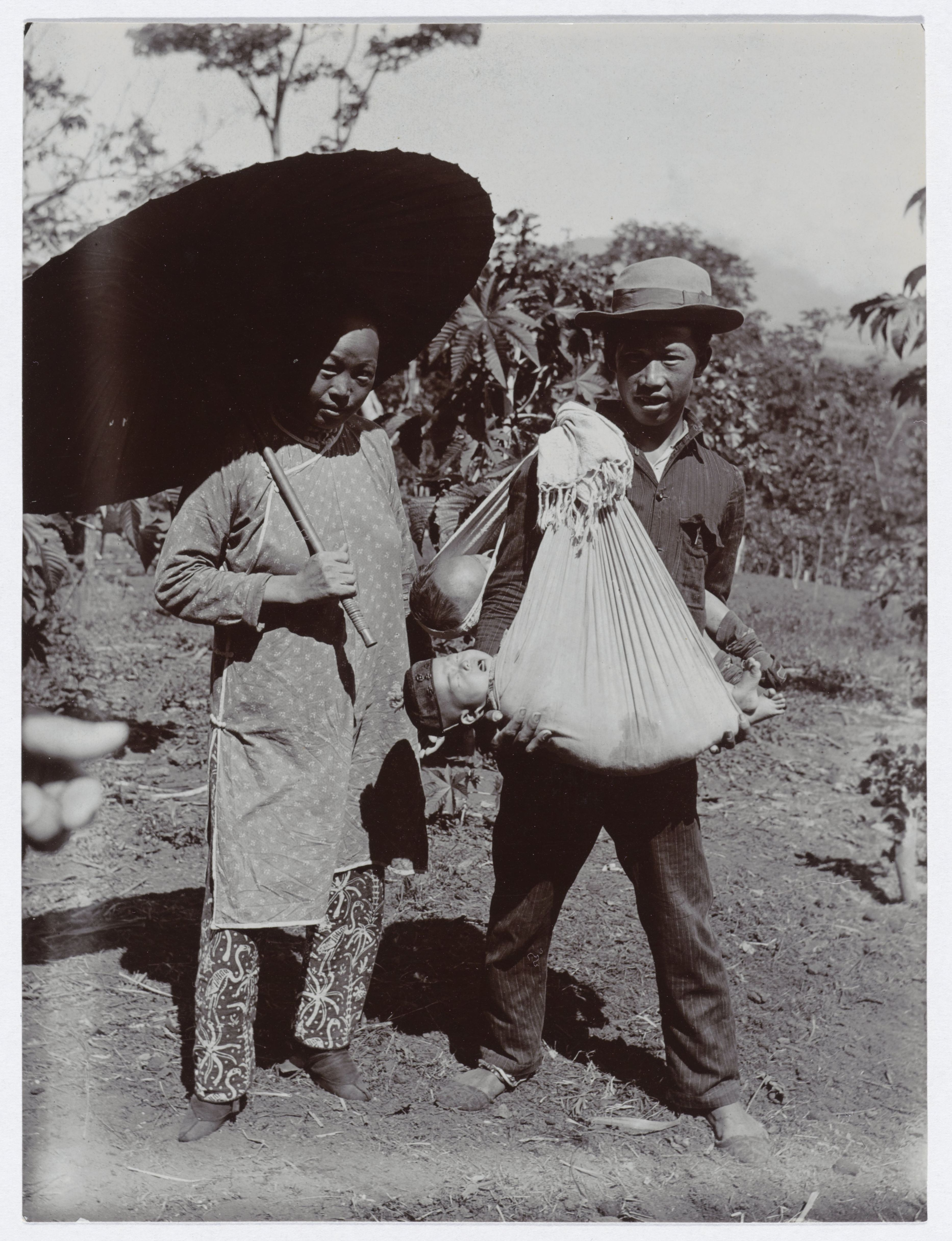
- A Chinese family in Bali (1900s)

Total population
- 14,970 (2010 Indonesian census)

Regions with significant populations
- Bali: 14,970 (0.38% of Bali population)
  - Denpasar: 8,900 (1.13%)
  - Badung: 1,542 (0.28%)
  - Buleleng: 1,378 (0.22%)
  - Tabanan: 988 (0.24%)
  - Gianyar: 416 (0.09%)
  - Karangasem: ? (0.06%)
  - Bangli: 66 (0.03%)
  - Klungkung: ? (0.01%)
- China: ~ 500 (1959) (Note: It is not known exactly how many population there, because no less than 100 thousand Chinese returned to their country in 1959, but there is a Balinese Chinese village called Bali Nansan Village, in Nansan, Quanzhou, Fujian, China which was inhabited by 500 people in 1959.)

Languages
- Balinese, Hokkien, Hakka, Hainanese, Teochew, Bali Aga and Indonesian

Religion
- Buddhism, Confucianism, Taoism, Hinduism, Christianity

Related ethnic groups
- Other Chinese Indonesians • Javanese Chinese • Bangka Belitung Chinese • Maluku Chinese, Balinese

Balinese Chinese (Indonesian: Orang Tionghoa Bali; pronounced [ˌoraŋ ˌt̪joŋhoa̯ ˈbali]; Mandarin Chinese: 峇里島華人 Bālí dǎo huárén; Balinese: ᬢᬶᬬᭀᬦ᭄ᬕ᭄ᬄᬯᬩᬮᬶ, romanized: tiyonghwa Bali) are ethnic Chinese people who live on Bali, Indonesia. According to the 2010 Indonesian census, Balinese Chinese numbered around 14,970 or 0.38% of the total population in Bali.

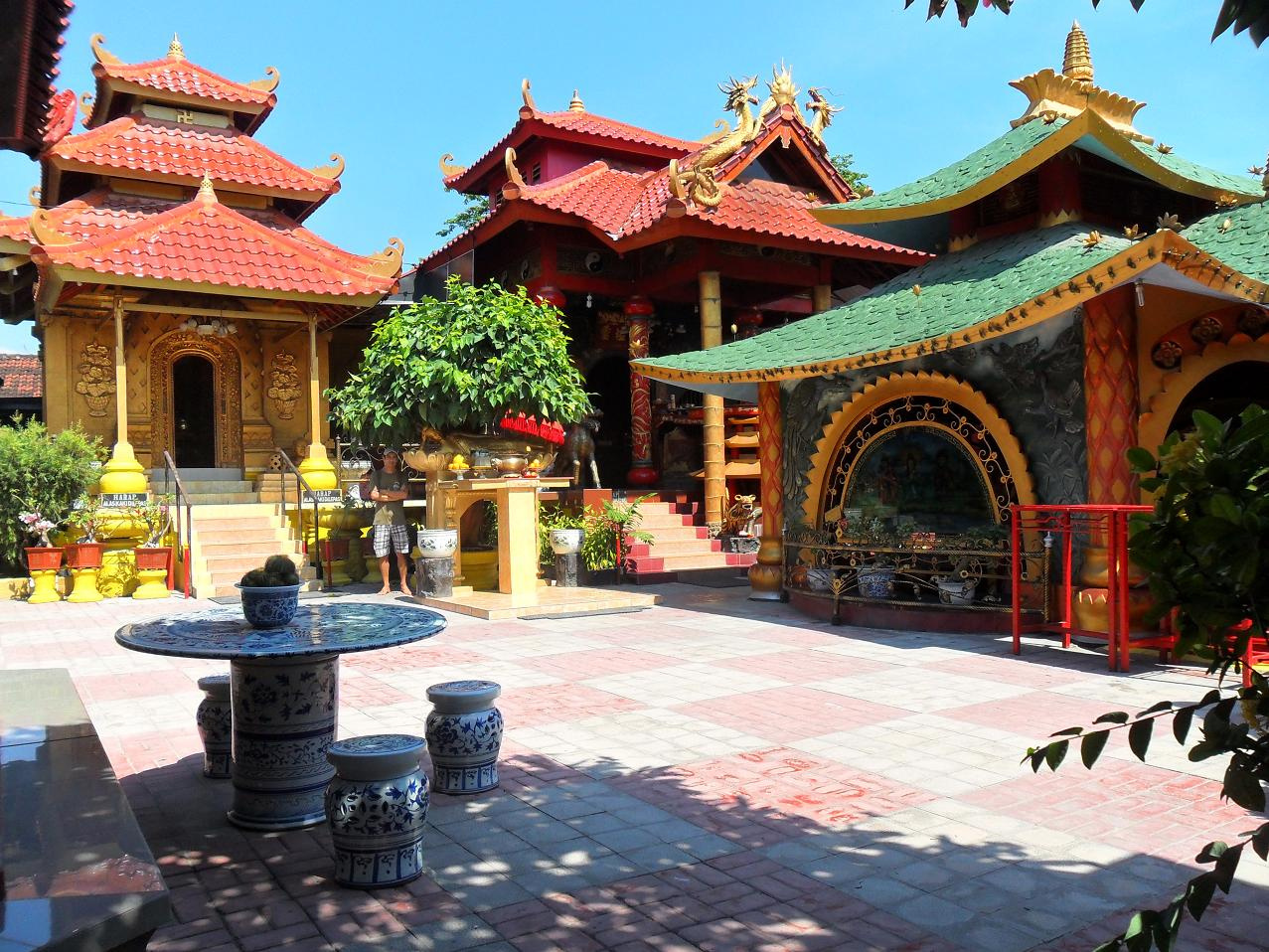
Chinese temple in Denpasar, Bali

== History ==
Sugi Lanus, a Balinese humanist and writer once made an analysis of Chinese-breed families in Bali. According to him, Chinese immigration to Bali is in different waves. In the pre-Majapahit era, the currency of the Balinese people was Mong locally known as Kepeng, a currency that is thought to have been originally used by Chinese people. The introduction of the Chinese currency indicated that Chinese trade controlled this island.

Pura Pucak Writing, which is thought to have existed around the 10th century AD in Bangli, wrote Sugi, cannot be separated from the connection between the legend of the marriage of a Chinese princess and a Balinese king. It is said that after the Chinese princess (surnamed Kang) married the king of Bali, they opened an area north of Mount Batur, on a stretch of fertile land about 4 kilometers from the Writing Temple. The place is called Bali-Kang, which until now is known as Pura Balingkang in Pingan Village. Pingan means peace in Chinese. Sugi noted that the Volkstelling Chinese census was a kind of census carried out by the Dutch government. The total number of Chinese immigrants who had entered Indonesia until 1930 had reached 1,233,214 people.

A number of Chinese descendants in Bali are spread across the triangular border of the three Kingdoms of Karangasem-Bangli-Klungkung. In Lampuk Hamlet, there are 6 clans that still live in Lampu: Lie, Siaw, Cwa, Po, Ang and Tan. When the New Order regime suppressed anything related to Chinese (unless it was profitable for the authorities), Balinese Chinese were still able to continue their traditions and beliefs. Balinese Chinese still pray at the Temple or Kongco, celebrate Chinese New Year (although without the fanfare of lion dance parades and firecrackers) and work like proper Indonesian citizens.

== See also ==
- Bali
- Chinese Indonesian
