= Vanga (disambiguation) =

Vangas are a group of birds found in Madagascar and Comoros, usually classified as the family Vangidae (including a list of birds in the family).

Vanga may also refer to:

- Vanga, Kenya, a village in Msambweni Constituency on the coast near the Tanzanian border
- Vanga, Kwilu, a village in the Democratic Republic of Congo
- Baba Vanga (1911–1996), Bulgarian prophetess
- Vanga Kingdom, an ancient kingdom in Bengal
- Vaṅga, the Sanskrit name for East Bengal
- Vanga Geetha, an Indian politician
- Sandeep Reddy Vanga, Indian filmmaker

== See also ==
- Banga (disambiguation)
- Bangla (disambiguation)
- Bengal (disambiguation)
- Vangaveeti (disambiguation)
