= Vangaveeti =

Vangaveeti may refer to:

- Vangaveeti Mohana Ranga (1948–1988), Indian politician
  - Vangaveeti (film), a 2016 Indian film

== See also ==
- Vanga (disambiguation)
