= Myra Sidharta =

Indonesian writer (born 1927)

- 歐陽春梅 欧阳春梅; Ōuyáng Chūnméi
- Born: Auw Jong Tjhoen Moy; 6 March 1927 (age 99); Belitung, Dutch East Indies (present-day Indonesia)
- Education: Leiden University; University of Indonesia
- Occupations: Writer; professor; psychologist
- Spouse: Priguna Sidharta (m. 1953; died 2003)
- Children: 3

Myra Sidharta (born Auw Jong Tjhoen Moy simplified Chinese: 欧阳春梅; traditional Chinese: 歐陽春梅; pinyin: Ōuyáng Chūnméi on 6 March 1927, Belitung) is an Indonesian writer, psychologist, and educator of Chinese descent. She specializes in Chinese Indonesian communities and Malay literature. In 2001, she published In Search of My Ancestral Home, which followed her journey back to her grandfather's town in China.

== Biography ==
Sidharta was born on the Indonesian island of Belitung into a Hakka Peranakan Chinese family. Her grandfather had emigrated from Meixian, Meizhou, Guangdong, China in 1872 and married a local Hakka woman. He and Sidharta's father worked for a Dutch mining company in town, allowing them to send their children to the Dutch schools available to employees. Her grandfather was concerned that his children and grandchildren would lose touch with their Chinese heritage, so encouraged them to learn Mandarin, which Sidharta excelled at. She also spoke Hakka Chinese at home. When the Japanese invaded in 1942, she finished her education at a hogere burgerschool in Batavia. She then studied psychology at Leiden University before returning home to study Indonesian literature at the University of Indonesia. She also began teaching psychology at the University of Indonesia at that time. Sidharta, who was born Auw Jong Tjhoen Moy, and other Chinese Indonesians were forced to change their names in 1966, so she adopted the name Myra Sidharta. Around this time, she began writing for publications including Kompas and The Jakarta Post.

Sidharta speaks German, Dutch, Belitung Malay (her birthplace's vernacular dialect and lingua franca), French, Mandarin, Hakka (her native Chinese dialect), Indonesian (national language) as well as English and is proficient in two other Chinese dialects namely Cantonese and Hokkien.

== Personal life ==
Sidharta met her husband, neuroscientist Priguna Sidharta (born Sie Pek Giok), while studying in Leiden. They married on 31 January 1953 and had three children: Sylvia, Julie, and Amir. After his death, she donated his medical books to Atma Jaya Catholic University of Indonesia.

== Selected works ==
Articles

- Myra Sidharta (1994). "Asmaraman Sukowati Kho Ping Hoo (b. 1926): Writer of Cloak-and-dagger Stories in Indonesia". Archipel. 48: 157–176.
- Claudine Salmon; Myra Sidharta (2000). "The Hainanese of Bali : A Little Known Community". Archipel. 60: 87–124.
- Claudine Salmon; Myra Sidharta (2006). "The Manufacture of Chinese Gravestones in Indonesia - A Preliminary Survey". Archipel. 72: 195–220.
- Claudine Salmon; Myra Sidharta (2007). "Traditional Chinese Medicine and Pharmacy in Indonesia – Some Sidelights". Archipel. 74: 165–204.
- Claudia Salmon; Myra Sidharta (2018). "Sino-Insulindian Private History Museums, Cultural Heritage Places, and the (Re)construction of the Past". Asian Culture.

Books

- Myra Sidharta (1989). 100 tahun Kwee Tek Hoay: dari penjaja tekstil sampai ke pendekar pena (in Indonesian). Pustaka Sinar Harapan. ISBN 978-979-416-040-4.
- Myra Sidharta (1992). "The Making of the Indonesian Chinese Woman". In E. B. Locher-Scholten; A. Niehof (eds.). Indonesian Women in Focus. Werkgroep lndonesische Vrouwenstudies. pp. 58–76. doi:10.1163/9789004488816_007. ISBN 978-90-67-18047-4.
- Myra Sidharta (2001). "In Search of My Ancestral Home". In Josephine Khu (ed.). Cultural Curiosity: Thirteen Stories about the Search for Chinese Roots. University of California Press. pp. 149–159. doi:10.1525/california/9780520223400.003.0009.
- Myra Sidharta (2001). "Jakarta through the eyes of 'Ko Put On'". In Peter J. M. Nas (ed.). Jakarta Batavia: Socio-Cultural Essays. Leiden: KITLV Press. pp. 157–173. doi:10.1163/9789004454293_010.
- Myra Sidharta (2004). Dari penjaja tekstil sampai superwoman: biografi delapan penulis peranakan (in Indonesian). Kepustakaan Populer Gramedi. ISBN 978-979-910-016-0.
- Myra Sidharta (2008). "10. Soyfoods in Indonesia". In Christine M. Du Bois; Chee Beng Tan; Sidney Wilfred Mintz (eds.). The World of Joy. NUS Press. pp. 195–207. ISBN 978-997-169-413-5.
- Myra Sidharta (2011). "CHAPTER 4: The Dragon's Trail in Chinese Indonesian Foodways". In Tan Chee-Beng (ed.). Chinese Food and Foodways in Southeast Asia and Beyond. NUS Press. pp. 107–123. doi:10.2307/j.ctv1ntg4x.9.
- Myra Sidharta (2015). Rita Sri Hastuti (ed.). Seribu senyum dan setetes air mata: kumpulan esai Myra Sidharta (in Indonesian). Penerbit Buku Kompas. ISBN 978-979-709-919-0.
