= Bunga =

Bunga may refer to

- Bunga, Uttarakhand, a hill station in the state of Uttarakhand, India
- Bunga bunga, an erotic entertainment
- Bunga mas, a tribute sent to the king of Siam by vassal states in the Malay Peninsula
- Bunga River, northeastern Nigeria
- Bunga bangkai, a common name in Indonesia for Amorphophallus titanum, the so-called "carrion flower"
- Bunga raya, the Malay name for Hibiscus rosa-sinensis, the national flower of Malaysia
- Bunga, or Botija, a Caribbean musical instrument of the aerophone type
- Bunga, a character from the Lion King spin-off The Lion Guard
- Bunga, an ethnic slur used in New Zealand for a pacific islander

== See also ==
- Banga (disambiguation)
- Bukit Bunga (disambiguation)

..
