= Bangka Malay =

Malayic language spoken in Indonesia

- bahase Bangka; base Bangka
- بهاس بڠك
- Native to: Indonesia (Province of Bangka Belitung Islands)
- Region: Bangka Island
- Ethnicity: Bangka Malay, Bangka Chinese, etc.
- Native speakers: (340,000 cited 2000 census)
- Language family: Austronesian: Malayo-Polynesian; (disputed); Malayic; Bangka Malay
- Dialects: Mentok; Belinyuliat; Sungailiat; Pangkalpinang; Toboali; Bangka Cina
- Writing system: Latin (Malay alphabet); Jawi

Language codes
- ISO 639-3: mfb
- Glottolog: bang1365
- ELP: Bangka
- Areas where Bangka Malay is a majority

Bangka or Bangka Malay (bahase Bangka or base Bangka, Belinyu dialect: baso Bangka, Jawi: بهاس بڠك), is a Malayic language spoken in Indonesia, specifically on the island of Bangka in the Bangka Belitung Islands of Sumatra. It is primarily spoken by the native Malay people of Bangka, as well as by immigrants from other parts of Indonesia and the Bangka Chinese, who use it as their second language in addition to their native Hakka. Bangka Malay is spoken exclusively on the island of Bangka, although it is related to Palembang Malay and Belitung Malay spoken on neighboring islands. There are five different dialects of Bangka Malay: the Pangkalpinang dialect, Mentok dialect, Belinyu dialect, Sungailiat dialect, and Toboali dialect. Each of these dialects has its own subdialects. Additionally, the Bangka Chinese community speaks their own dialect of Bangka Malay, which is influenced by Hakka. The differences between each of these dialects are mostly lies in their phonology and morphology, except for the Bangka Cina dialect, which also has slight differences in vocabulary.

In Bangka, Bangka Malay serves as the lingua franca among the island's diverse ethnic groups. It has been influenced by Palembang Malay, owing to Bangka's historical association with the Palembang Sultanate, as well as by Hakka, introduced by Chinese migrants, and standard Indonesian, the national language of Indonesia. Bangka Malay exhibits notable phonological and lexical differences from standard Indonesian and other Malay dialects, while its morphological structures generally remain identical, facilitating mutual intelligibility. It incorporates distinctive vocabulary that distinguishes it from both standard Indonesian and other dialects.

== Classification ==
Bangka Malay is a Malayic language. Speakers of Malayic language are spread from Brunei, Indonesia, Malaysia, Singapore, Southern Thailand, to the southernmost part of the Philippines. Malay is a member of the Austronesian family of languages, which includes languages from Taiwan, Southeast Asia and the Pacific Ocean, with a smaller number in continental Asia. Malagasy, a geographic outlier spoken in Madagascar in the Indian Ocean, is also a member of this language family. Although these languages are not necessarily mutually intelligible to any extent, their similarities are often quite apparent. In more conservative languages like Malay, many roots have come with relatively little change from their common ancestor, Proto-Austronesian language. There are many cognates found in the languages' words for kinship, health, body parts and common animals. Numbers, especially, show remarkable similarities.

Bangka Malay is closely related to other Malay dialects like Palembang Malay and Belitung Malay spoken on nearby islands, but closer to Loncong Malay spoken by nomadic sea gypsies from Belitung. However, Bangka Malay has its own distinct features in vocabulary, grammar, and pronunciation that set it apart from standard Indonesian and other Malay varieties.

== Geographic distribution and usage ==
Bangka Malay is exclusively spoken on Bangka and its surrounding islands, as well as by the Bangka diaspora living in other parts of Indonesia. However, Bangka Malay is not the only language spoken on the island. The Chinese community in Bangka, who migrated from Guangdong due to the booming tin mining industry in the 19th century, primarily speak Hakka or Mandarin, though many also speak Bangka Malay as a second language. On the other hand, the Orang Laut, sea nomads inhabiting the coastal regions of Bangka and the surrounding islands, speak a distinct variety of Malay known as Loncong or Sekak. Additionally, due to transmigration policies enacted during the Dutch colonial era and continuing through the New Order, many immigrants from Java and other parts of Indonesia have settled in Bangka, bringing their own languages and cultures with them.

Like other regional languages in Indonesia, Bangka Malay serves as an important and effective means of communication, especially within family settings, among peers, and in informal gatherings. In formal settings such as wedding parties, ceremonies, public meetings, and sermons in mosques or prayer rooms, people in Bangka almost always use Indonesian, sometimes mixed with Bangka Malay. Indonesian is also used in government offices, schools, and official ceremonies. While the language of instruction in schools is Indonesian, in the early grades of elementary school, teachers who are native to Bangka often use Bangka Malay to present lessons. In markets, Bangka Malay is generally used among Bangka people, while code-mixing with other regional languages, such as Palembang Malay, is common among people from outside Bangka. Additionally, with the growing influence of Indonesian as the national language, Bangka people are increasingly code-switching and code-mixing between Bangka Malay and Indonesian.

Bangka Malay holds a prestigious position among its speakers. This becomes apparent when students, university students, or officials returning from assignments outside Bangka converse with local elders or community leaders—they typically opt for Bangka Malay over Indonesian. This choice of language conveys a deeper respect to the elders and community leaders compared to using Indonesian. In fact, speaking Indonesian in such contexts after returning from outside Bangka can be seen as disrespectful.

== Dialects ==
There are five recognized dialects of Bangka Malay, namely Mentok, Belinyu, Sungailiat, Pangkalpinang, and Toboali, each corresponding to administrative units in Bangka. The Mentok dialect is often referred to as the West Bangka dialect, the Belinyu dialect as the North Bangka dialect, and the Toboali dialect as the South Bangka dialect. Meanwhile, the Sungailiat and Pangkalpinang dialects are collectively known as the Central Bangka dialect. In addition, the Chinese community in Bangka speaks a distinct dialect of Bangka Malay infused with Hakka influences. Each of these dialects consists of several sub-dialects, which may differ from one district or village to another. Most of the differences among these dialects primarily lie in phonology and morphology, with vocabulary differences being relatively minor. For example, the Belinyu dialect shows significant phonological influence from Palembang Malay, where words that typically end with [a] in standard Malay and Indonesian change to [o], such as apa 'what' becoming apo, kita 'we' becoming kito, and tiga 'three' becoming tigo. The Belinyu dialect also shares similar pronouns with Palembang Malay, such as kamek 'we (exclusive)'. Additionally, due to its interaction with Palembang Malay, the Belinyu dialect has adopted words from Javanese, including wong 'people' and lanang 'male'. Other Bangka Malay dialects, on the other hand, exhibit similarities with the Malay dialect spoken in Riau and Peninsular Malaysia, where words that typically end with [a] change to [e], such as apa 'what' becoming ape, rasa 'taste' becoming rase, and so on.

There are some lexical differences among different dialects, but they are limited, and each dialect is mostly mutually intelligible with the others. Below are examples of lexical differences in Bangka Malay across various dialects:

Standard Indonesian	Bangka Malay				English Translation
Standard Indonesian	West Bangka	North Bangka	South Bangka	Central Bangka	English Translation
Standard Indonesian	Mentok	Belinyu	Toboali	Sungailiat and Pangkalpinang	English Translation
hidup	idup	idup	idup	idup	to live
orang	orang	urang, wong	urong, urun	uran	people
kami	kami	kamek	kami	kami	we (exclusive)
rumah	romah	ruma	ruma	rumah	house
pergi	pegi	gi	gi	gi	to go
tidur	tidok	tiduk	tiduk	tiduk	to sleep
anak	budak	budak	berik	anak	kid
semua	semue	semuo	hamue	gale, segale	all

The Bangka Cina dialect, spoken by the Chinese community in Bangka, incorporates loanwords from Hakka. For example, amoi 'Chinese girls', which is derived from the Hakka word â-moi (阿妹), cion 'beautiful', which is derived from the Hakka word chiâng (靚), and hoklo 'rich person', which is derived from the Hakka word ho̍k-ló (學佬).

== Phonology ==
Bangka Malay, like many other regional languages in Indonesia, lacks a standardized phonological system. Each dialect may also have unique phonological features not found in other dialects. Nevertheless, the phonological system of most Bangka Malay dialects is largely based on standard Indonesian orthography.

=== Vowels ===
Like Indonesian, all Bangka Malay dialects have the same number of vowels, possessing six phonemic vowels: i, ə, e, a, o, and u.

	Front	Central	Back
Close	i		u
Mid	e	ə	o
Open		a	

Notes:

- In writing, /e/ and /ə/ are both represented as ⟨e⟩.
- Final /a/ in Baku Malay/Indonesian correspond to /ə/ in Bangka Malay, so Baku Malay/Indonesian ada /ada/ "to have" corresponds to Bangka Malay ade /adə/.
- Baku Malay/Indonesian /i/ and /u/ in closed syllables correspond to lower /e/ and /o/ in Bangka Malay, so Baku Malay/Indonesian pasir /pasir/ "sand" and taruh /taruh/ "to place" correspond to Bangka Malay paser /paser/ and tarok /taroʔ/.
- Unlike almost all other Malayic languages, Bangka preserves Proto-Malayic *ə in final closed syllables (lier /liər/, from *liher "neck"). This feature is also shared by Betawi (and therefore Indonesian slang) and the Palembang Lama dialect, considered within a relic area.

=== Consonants ===
All Bangka Malay dialects have 19 consonants, similar to Indonesian and Standard Malay. However, there are some differences in the articulation of certain consonants. For example, in Standard Malay and Indonesian, the consonant "w" is an approximant velar consonant, while in Bangka Malay, "w" is an approximant labial consonant.

		Labial	Dental	Alveolar	Alveopalatal	Velar	Glottal
Nasal		m		n	ɲ	ŋ	
Plosive/ Affricate	voiceless	p		t	t͡ʃ	k	ʔ
Plosive/ Affricate	voiced	b		d	d͡ʒ	ɡ	
Fricative				s			h
Approximant		w			j		
Trill				r			
Lateral				l			

Notes:

- In writing, the following phonemes are represented as thus:
  - /ŋ/ is ⟨ng⟩
  - /ɲ/ is ⟨ny⟩
  - /t͡ʃ/ is ⟨c⟩
  - /d͡ʒ/ is ⟨j⟩
  - /ʔ/ is ⟨k⟩
  - /j/ is ⟨y⟩
- /ʔ/ only occurs root-finally.

=== Diphthongs ===
In Bangka Malay, there are almost no words that begin with diphthongs. Generally, diphthongs are found at the end of words. In all dialects of the Bangka Malay language, there are three diphthongs, namely /ai̯/, /oi̯/, and /au̯/. The diphthongs /ai̯/ and /oy/ are fronting diphthongs, and the diphthong /aw/ is a backing diphthong. The use of these diphthongs can be seen below:

- /ai̯/: pantay 'beach', sungay 'river'
- /oi̯/: oy 'oi', amboy 'wow'
- /au̯/: suraw 'surau', bulaw 'fur'

The Pangkalpinang dialect has two additional diphthongs, which are /ow/ and /ey/. The Pangkalpinang dialect commonly employs the diphthongs /aw/ or /ow/ at the end of words, whereas other dialects typically use the vowel /u/. In addition, the Pangkalpinang dialect uses the diphthong /ey/ at the end of words, while other dialects use the vowel /i/ at the end of words. The use of these diphthongs can be seen below:

- /ou̯/: barow 'new' (other dialects: baru), batow 'stone' (other dialects: batu)
- /ei̯/: jarey 'finger' (other dialects: jari), kuncey 'key' (other dialects: kunci)

== Grammar ==
Along with Indonesian, standard Malay, and other Malayic languages, the word order in Bangka Malay is typically subject-verb-object (SVO). While there are notable exceptions, the grammar structure of Bangka Malay shares many similarities with Indonesian and Standard Malay.

=== Affixes ===
Bangka Malay has a number of affixes that can join with the base word to form an affixed word. In Bangka Malay, like other Malayic languages, there are three types of affixes: prefixes, infixes, and suffixes. Prefixes are affixes attached at the beginning of a word, suffixes are affixes added at the end of a word, and infixes are affixes inserted in the middle of a word. Similar to other Malayic languages, Bangka Malay words are composed of a root or a root plus derivational affixes. The root is the primary lexical unit of a word and is usually bisyllabic, of the shape CV(C)CV(C). Affixes are "glued" onto roots (which are either nouns or verbs) to alter or expand the primary meaning associated with a given root, effectively generating new words.

==== Prefixes ====
In every dialect of Bangka Malay, there are seven prefixes: N-, be-, te-, di-, peN-, se- and ke-. Specifically in the Toboali dialect, the prefix se- changes to ke- based on its phonological characteristics. These five dialects of Bangka Malay do not exhibit significant phonological changes in prefixes morphophonemically, in relation to other morphemes.

The prefix N- with a base form of verbs indicates 'performing the action described by the base form', such as merikin for 'counting'. When applied to nouns, the prefix N- signifies (1) 'becoming', as seen in mengarami for 'becoming salt', (2) 'making', as in merempah for 'making spices', (3) 'enjoying' or 'drinking', exemplified by ngopi meaning 'drinking coffee'. When used with adjectives, N- denotes 'becoming', like membesak for 'becoming large' or 'brightening up'.

In these dialects, the prefix N- changes to /n/ when followed by a word starting with a vowel phoneme. For example:

- N- + kapur 'calcium' → ngapur 'calcification'
- N- + kopi 'coffee' → ngopi 'to have a coffee'
- N- + kacaw 'messy' → ngacaw 'to mess up'

In those five dialects, the prefix N- changes to /n/ when followed by a word starting with the phoneme /g/. In the Mentok dialect, however, the phoneme /g/ does not undergo lenition, whereas in other dialects, the phoneme /g/ undergo lenition. For example:

- N- + gigit 'bite' → nggigit 'to bite' (other dialects is ngigit)
- N- + goyang 'shake' → nggoyang 'to shake' (other dialects is ngoyan)
- N- + gunting 'cut' → nggunting 'cut' (other dialects is nguntin)

In all five dialects of Bangka Malay, the prefix N- changes to /m/ when followed by a word that begins with the phoneme /p/. In this case, the phoneme /p/ will disappear. For example:

- N- + pacul 'hoe' → macul 'to hoe'
- N- + pegang 'hold' → megang 'to hold'
- N- + pukul 'punch' → mukul 'to punch'

In all five dialects of the Bangka Malay language, the prefix N- changes to /m/ when followed by a word that begins with the phoneme /b/. In this case, the phoneme /b/ does not undergo lenition in the Mentok dialect, whereas in the other dialects, the phoneme /b/ undergo lenition. For example:

- N- + beli 'buy' → mbeli 'to buy' (other dialects is meli)
- N- + buang 'throw' → mbuan 'to throw' (other dialects is muan)
- N- + bunuh 'kill' → mbunuh 'to kill' (other dialects is munuh)

In all five dialects of Bangka Malay, the prefix N- changes to /ŋe/ when followed by a word that consists of only one syllable. For example:

- N- + bom 'bomb' → ngebom 'to bomb'
- N- + cet 'paint' → ngecet 'to paint'
- N- + las 'weld' → ngelas 'to weld'

In all five dialects of Bangka Malay, the prefix N- changes to /ɲ/ when followed by a word that begins with the phoneme /s/. For example:

- N- + sapu 'broom' → nyapu 'to sweep'
- N- + sikat 'brush' → nyapu 'to brush'
- N- + sipak 'kick' → nyipak 'to kick'

In all five dialects of Bangka Malay, the prefix N- changes to /n/ when followed by a word that begins with the phoneme /t/. In this case, the phoneme /t/ will undergo lenition. For example:

- N- + tulis 'write' → nulies 'to write'
- N- + tangkep 'catch' → nangkep 'to catch'
- N- + tunjok 'point' → nunjok 'to appoint'

In all five dialects of the Bangka Malay language, the prefix N- changes to /n/ when followed by a word that begins with the phoneme /d/. In this case, the phoneme /d/ does not undergo lenition in the Mentok dialect, whereas in the other dialects, the phoneme /d/ undergo lenition. For example:

- N- + dapet 'get' → ndapet 'to get' (other dialects is napet)
- N- + darat 'land' → ndarat 'to land' (other dialects is narat)
- N- + denger 'hear' → ndenger 'to hear' (other dialects is nenger)

When followed by a word that begins with the phoneme /l/ or the phoneme /j/, the prefix N- changes to /n/. In this case, the phoneme /l/ or /j/ does not undergo lenition in the Mentok dialect. In the other dialects, the prefix N- changes to /ɲ/. In this case, the phoneme /l/ or /j/ undergo lenition. For example:

- N- + cuci 'wash' → nyuci 'to get' (other dialects is ncuci)
- N- + cube 'try' → nyube 'to try' (other dialects is ncube)
- N- + jual 'sell' → nyual 'to hear' (other dialects is njual)

When followed by a word that begins with the phoneme /l/, /r/, /w/, or /y/, the prefix N- changes to /ŋe/ in the Mentok dialect. In this case, the phonemes /l/, /r/, /w/, and /y/ do not undergo lenition. In the other dialects, the prefix N- changes to /me/. In this case, the phonemes /l/, /r/, /w/, and /y/ also do not undergo lenition. For example:

- N- + lapis 'layer' → ngelapis 'to layer' (other dialects is melapis)
- N- + lipet 'fold' → ngelipet 'to fold' (other dialects is melipet)
- N- + rase 'taste' → ngerase 'to taste' (other dialects is merase)

Some speakers of the Belinyu, Sungailiat, and Pangkalpinang dialects also use the allomorphs /meŋ/, /mem/, /men/, and /meɲ/ alongside the allomorphs /ŋ/, /m/, /n/, and /ɲ/. For example:

- N- + buang 'throw' → membuang or muang 'to throw'
- N- + tulis 'write' → menulis or nulis 'to write'
- N- + sipak 'kick' → menyipak or nyipak 'to kick'

The prefix be- with a base form of verbs signifies 'often performing the action described by the base form', such as beburu for 'often hunting'. The prefix be- with a base form of nouns denotes (1) 'having', as in beanak for 'having children', (2) 'ascending', like beuto for 'ascending a hill' or bermobil for 'using a car', (3) 'wearing', as in besepan for 'wearing trousers', (4) 'engaging in', such as bekebon for 'engaging in gardening' or 'gardening', and (5) 'containing', exemplified by beracun meaning 'containing poison'.

In all five dialects of Bangka Malay, the prefix be- changes to /ber/ when attached to a word that begins with a vowel phoneme. However, when attached to a word that begins with a different phoneme, the prefix be- does not change. For example:

- be- + perang 'war' → berperang 'to wage war'
- be- + asep 'smoke' → berasep 'smoky'
- be- + aek 'water' → beraek 'watery'

The prefix te- with a base form of verbs signifies 'completed, unintentional, or capable of performing the action described by the base form', such as teangkat for 'accidentally lifted' or 'able to be lifted'. The prefix te- with a base form of nouns means 'to emit', like tekemah for 'to emit a smell' or 'to urinate'. The prefix te- with a base form of adjectives means 'more', as in tepedas for 'more spicy' or 'spicier'.

In all five dialects of Bangka Malay, the prefix te- changes to /ter/ when attached to a word that begins with a vowel phoneme, whereas when attached to a word that begins with a different phoneme, the prefix te- does not change. For example:

- te- + angket 'lift' → terangket 'get lifted'
- te- + makan 'eat' → termakan 'get eaten'
- te- + buang 'throw' → terbuang 'get thrown'

The prefix peN- with a base form of verbs denotes 'someone or something that performs the action described by the base form', such as pencuci for 'someone or something that washes'. Prefix peN- with a base form of adjectives signifies 'having the quality of being lazy' or 'a tool for becoming', as seen in penalus for 'a tool for becoming smooth' or 'a smoother'.

In all five dialects of Bangka Malay, the prefix di- does not have any alternates. In these dialects, the prefix peN- changes to pen- when preceding words starting with /j/, /t/, /d/, /e/. In this case, /j/ and /t/ undergo lenition, while /d/, /e/, or /j/ do not undergo lenition. For example:

- peN- + tari 'dance' → penari 'dancer'
- peN- + dateng 'come' → pendateng 'newcomer'
- peN- + jale 'net' → penjale 'netter'

Prefix peN- changes to pen when preceding a word that begins with the phoneme /s/, and the phoneme /s/ undergo lenition. For example:

- peN- + sapu 'broom' → penyapu 'sweeper'
- peN- + suap 'bribe' → penyuap 'briber'
- peN- + sayang 'care' → penyayang 'carer'

Prefix peN- changes to /pe/ when preceding a word that begins with the phoneme /l/, /r/, /w/, or /j/. For example

- peN- + wares 'inherit' → pewares 'inheriter'
- peN- + wangi 'fragrant' → pewangi 'fragrance'
- peN- + rase 'taste' → perase 'taster'

The prefix se- with a base form of verbs signifies 'doing an action together with others', such as seminum for 'drinking together'. Prefix se- with a base form of nouns means 'using something together', like seromah for 'using a house together' or 'living together'. Prefix se- with a base form of adjectives denotes 'similar', as in sebesar for 'as big as' or 'of the same size'.

In all five dialects of Bangka Malay, the prefix se- does not have any alternates. For example:

- se- + romah 'house' → seromah 'whole house'
- se- + tinggi 'tall' → setinggi 'as tall as'
- se- + luas 'wide' → seluas 'as wide as'

The prefix ke- with a base form of verbs means 'to be affected by', such as kecopet for 'to be affected by pickpocketing' or 'to get pickpocketed'. Prefix ke- with a base form of adjectives signifies 'being viewed', like ketua for 'being viewed as a leader' or 'leader'.

In Bangka Malay, the prefix ke- does not have any alternates. For example:

- ke- + tue 'old' → ketue 'leader, elder'
- ke- + kaseh 'love' → kekaseh 'lover'
- ke- + liet 'see' → keliet 'visible'

==== Infixes ====
In Bangka Malay, there exist three infixes: -el-, -em-, -er-. However, these infixes are not that productive in forming new words within this language. There are very few newly formed words utilizing these infixes across the five dialects of Bangka Malay. In Bangka Malay, infix is defined as 'many or multiple', such as gerigi which means 'many teeth'. For example:

- -el- + tunjuk 'point' → telunjuk 'index finger'
- -el- + tapak 'footstep' → telapak 'palm'
- -em- + guncan 'shake' → gemuncan 'shaking'
- -em- + guruh 'thunder' → gemuruh 'thundering'

==== Suffixes ====
In Bangka Malay, there are three suffixes: -ken, -ne, and -an. The usage of these suffixes varies across the five dialects of Bangka Malay.

The suffix -ken with a base form of verbs means 'to put into or to make into', similar to the suffix -kan in Standard Indonesian and Malay, such as sarongken for 'to put into a sheath' or 'to sheath'. The suffix -ken with a base form of adjectives means 'to make more', such as kecitken for 'to make smaller' or 'to shrink'. The suffix -ken varies across different dialects. The Mentok, Belinyu, and Toboali dialects use -ken, the Sungailiat dialect also uses -ken, but pronounced as /kən/, and the Pangkalpinang dialect uses -kan. The usage of the suffix is shown below:

- duduk 'sit' + -ken → dudukken 'to make someone sit'
- minom 'drink' + -ken → minomken 'to make someone drink'
- lari 'run' + -ken → lariken 'to make someone run'

The suffix -nye with a base form of verbs or adjectives denotes 'something related to the matter mentioned in the base form', as seen in larinye, which refers to 'something related to running or its running'. The equivalent in Standard Indonesian and Malay for this suffix is -nya. The suffix also varies across different dialects. The Mentok dialect uses -nye, the Belinyu dialect uses -nyo, while the Sungailiat, Toboali, and Pangkalpinang dialects use -e, pronounced as /ə/. The usage is shown below:

- tinggi 'tall' + -nye → tingginye 'so tall'
- malam 'night' + -nye → malamnye 'so dark'
- puteh 'white' + -nye → putihnye 'so white'

The suffix -an, in Bangka Malay, is only used with verbs to form new words meaning 'tool or result of performing the action indicated by the base form', such as timbangan 'weight scale', which means 'tool for or result of weighing'. The suffix -an is only used in the Mentok, Sungailiat, and Pangkalpinang dialects. The Belinyu dialect often does not use the suffix -an. In fact, the Toboali dialect does not use this suffix at all. In the Belinyu dialect, words like cucian 'laundry' are expressed as baju kotor and tulisan 'writing' as tulis. The usage is shown below:

- main 'play' + -an → mainan 'toy'
- hari 'day' + -an → harian 'daily routine'
- cuci 'wash' + -an → cucian 'laundry'

=== Reduplication ===
The five dialects in Bangka Malay do not show variations in the use of full reduplication. Full reduplication is applied to nouns, verbs, and adjectives. Full reduplication with nouns is used to indicate plurality or forms resembling the base form. For example:

- kude-kude 'horse-horse'
- rumah-rumah 'house-house'
- pal-pal 'pole-pole' (from Dutch)

Full reduplication with verbs in Bangka Malay is used to indicate performing the action described by the base form repeatedly or continuously. For example:

- duduk-duduk 'sitting idly'
- jalan-jalan 'walking around'
- makan-makan 'eating together'

Full reduplication with adjectives in Bangka Malay is used to express intensity or to indicate being constantly in the state described by the base form. For example:

- pintar-pintar 'smart'
- rajin-rajin 'hardworking'
- sakit-sakit 'sick'

Partial reduplication with verbs is used to indicate repeated actions or reciprocal actions described by the base form. In this case, the Belinyu dialect uses the prefix be-, while other dialects use the prefix N-. For example:

- begebuk-gebuk 'to fight one another' (other dialects is gebuk-mengebuk)
- betarik-tarik 'to pull one another' (other dialects is tarik-menarik)
- betiru-tiru 'to mimic one another' (other dialects is tiru-meniru)

=== Nouns ===
Nouns can be combined with the suffixes -ku and -e as well as the prefix peN- or can be directly linked with numerals. There are some base words that are already counted as nouns. For example:

- burung 'bird'
- bini 'wife'
- sungot 'mouth'
- telo 'egg'
- asuk 'dog' (from Javanese)

Nouns can also be identified through a number of distinguishing features. For example, numerals are a stable determinant of nouns. Noun-forming affixes include -ku, -e, and peN-. Examples include:

- ketue 'leader' or 'elder'
- pemaling 'thief'
- penjerat 'trapper'
- umahku 'my house'
- binie 'his wife'

Nouns can also be combined with personal pronouns and demonstrative pronouns, such as ika' 'your', kite 'our (exclusive)', ini 'this' or itu 'that'. For example:

- umah ikak 'your house'
- umah kite 'our house'
- umah ini 'this house'
- umah itu 'that house'

Nouns can also be combined with quantitative structural words, such as banyak 'many' or tiap 'every'. For example:

- banyak umah tebakar 'many houses are on fire'
- banyak urang nanam kupi 'many people are planting coffees'
- bakarung-karung kupi 'sacks of coffee'
- tiap urang Islam 'every Muslims'

=== Verbs ===
Verbs are words that can be used as commands or words that have the affixes me-, di-, be-, ke-, -kan. There are several verbs that are already in the form of base words. For example:

- ambik 'take'
- duduk 'sit'
- kejar 'chase'
- tugak 'call'

The affixes that determine verbs are as follows:

- mawak 'to bring'
- nyerong 'to push'
- dicekek 'got strangled'
- dimakan 'got eaten'
- betemu 'to meet'
- bebunyi 'to sound'
- kedengar 'to be heard'
- kepanas 'to feel hot'
- basuhken 'to wash'
- polidangken 'to throw'
- teinjak 'got stepped'
- tegantung 'got hanged'

The structural word lah in commands serves as a determinant for verbs. For example:

- pangkulah 'to grasp'
- bacelah 'to read'
- simpenlah 'to keep'

=== Adjectives ===
Adjectives are words that can be compared and occupy specific positions in sentences. Adjectives can be basic words consisting of two syllables or occasionally just one syllable. For example:

- kayo 'rich'
- kutor 'dirty'
- burok 'bad'
- besak 'big'
- kecit 'small'

Adjectives can also take the form of derived words, which can be created by adding prefixes or through reduplication. For example:

- sepacak-pacake 'as much as possible'
- sekecit-kecite 'as small as possible'
- tekayo 'richest'
- tetinggi 'highest'

There are several adverbs that can function as determiners for adjectives. These adverbs can occupy positions both before and after adjectives in sentences. Examples include umon 'really', sikit 'a little', paling 'most', and dak 'not'. The usage of these words can be seen below:

- panas umon 'really hot'
- kutor umon 'really dirty'
- merah sikit 'a little red'
- maju sikit 'a little forward'
- paling gancang 'the fastest'
- paling membantu 'the most helpful'
- dak luas 'not wide'
- dak sihat 'not healthy'

=== Adverbs ===
Adverb can occupy both the initial and final positions in a sentence. Examples of adverbs include agik 'again', di sini 'here', pelan 'slowly', and terang umon 'clearly'. Their usage can be seen in the following examples:

- Urang tu ngisahken kisahe sekali agik. 'The man told his story once again'
- Urang tu ngisahken kisahe di sini. 'The man tells his story here.'
- Die nyupir pelan. 'He's driving the car slowly.'
- Terang umon die ngisah kisahe. 'He's telling the story clearly.'

The degree of comparison of adverbs can be divided into comparative and superlative. Examples of comparative adverbs are:

- lambat nue 'slower'
- jelas nue 'clealer'

Examples of superlative adverbs are:

- selambete 'slowest'
- sejelase 'clearest'

=== Pronouns ===
Pronouns in Bangka Malay can be divided into personal pronouns, demonstrative pronouns and interrogative pronouns.

==== Personal pronouns ====
This table shows an overview over the most commonly and widely used personal pronouns in Bangka Malay.

Person	Singular	Plural		
Person	Singular	Neutral	Exclusive	Inclusive
1st person	aku, ku, kami, saye, sayo		kami, kamek	kite, kito
2nd person	ikak, kau, ka, saudara, engka, ente	diorang, ikak, jorang		
3rd person	die, nya, no, nyo, ikak, entei, beliau	ikak, mereka		

There can exist different pronouns in Bangka Malay with the same English equivalent, depending on the politeness level or other usage. For example, "I" in Bangka Malay can be translated as aku or saye. Saye is usually used in more polite situations, while aku is the opposite.

The usage of personal pronouns varies among the dialects of Bangka Malay. For example, sayo 'I', kamek 'we (exclusive)', and kito 'we (inclusive)' are primarily used in the Belinyu dialect, while other dialects use saye, kami, and kite respectively. The word ente 'you', borrowed from Arabic, is primarily used in the Central Bangka dialect (Pangkalpinang and Sungailiat). The word ikak can have different meanings depending on the dialect. In the Mentok dialect, it means 'you,' whereas in the Toboali dialect, it means 'them.'

==== Interrogative pronouns ====
Examples of interrogative pronouns in Bangka Malay include ape/apo 'what', siape/sape/sapo 'who/whose', macem mane/cemane 'how', hape 'who (Toboali dialect)', berape 'how much', sebile 'when', hebile 'when (Toboali dialect)', and ngape 'why'. The usage of the aforementioned words are shown below:

- Ape gawe ikak? 'What are your jobs?'
- Etek sape ni masok dapor kite ni? 'Whose duck came into our kitchen?'
- Cobelah pakai akel cemane care e bise pulang. 'Try to use your wits to figure out how you can go home.'
- Berape angke plat motor ka? 'What is your motorcycle's license plate number?'
- Yo sebile bawak urang rumah e ke sini? 'When will you bring your wife here?'
- Ngape ka begegese cem tu, santai bai. 'Why are you so restless? Just calm down.'

==== Demonstrative pronouns ====
There are two demonstrative pronouns in Bangka Malay. Ni "this, these" is used for a noun generally near to the speaker. Tu "that, those" is used for a noun generally far from the speaker. Either may sometimes be equivalent to English "the". There is no difference between singular and plural. Example of the usage of these words are shown below:

- Tolong isik angen ban motorku ni. 'Please fill up my motorbike's tires.'
- Belagak e ka ni. You are so arrogant.'
- Nasik di atas meja tu lah basik. 'The rice on the table is already spoiled.'
- Kanak-kanak tu maen bal terus. 'The children keep playing the ball.'

== Vocabulary ==
Like other Malayic languages, Bangka Malay features several unique vocabularies that are not found in Standard Malay or Indonesian. Additionally, each dialect within Bangka Malay has its own lexical differences. As Bangka was historically governed by the Palembang Sultanate, there has been significant lexical influence from Palembang Malay on Bangka Malay, particularly in the Belinyu dialect. Bangka Malay has absorbed loanwords from Palembang Malay, such as sikok 'one', betino 'female', and mato 'eye'. In addition, under the influence of Palembang Malay, Bangka Malay has incorporated a significant number of Javanese loanwords, as Javanese was once the court language of the Palembang Sultanate. Terms such as buntut 'tail' and kuping 'ear' have entered Bangka Malay via Palembang Malay, originating from Javanese. The influence of Javanese and other regional languages on Bangka Malay may have increased due to the influx of migrants from other parts of Indonesia to Bangka. With Indonesian holding the status of the national language and serving as the language of education and business in Indonesia, Bangka Malay has gradually begun to absorb many loanwords from Indonesian. This phenomenon is not only observed in Bangka Malay, but also in other regional languages throughout the country.

There is also some influence of foreign languages on Bangka Malay, notably from Hakka, Dutch and Arabic. The influx of immigrants from Guangdong in the 19th century led to a significant Hakka community settling in Bangka. As a result, Bangka Malay has incorporated vocabulary from Hakka. As Bangka was once under Dutch rule, similar to other parts of Indonesia, it adopted a few loanwords from Dutch. Some words derived from Dutch in Bangka Malay are not found in standard Indonesian or other languages, such as bal 'ball', which in standard Indonesian and Malay is translated as bola, as well as uto 'car' which in standard Indonesian and Malay is translated as mobil or kereta respectively. Arabic words entered Bangka Malay due to the spread of Islam or Arab migration to Bangka, examples include afdhol 'better' and ente 'you'.

Below are examples of commonly used Bangka Malay vocabulary in various dialects, along with their Indonesian and English translations:

=== Numerals ===
Number	Mentok	Belinyu	Toboali	Sungailiat and Pangkalpinang	Indonesian	English
1	sekok	sikok	hikok	sikok	satu	one
2	due	duo	due	due	dua	two
3	tige	tigo	tige	tige	tiga	three
4	empat	empat	empat	empat	empat	four
5	lime	limo	lime	lime	lima	five
6	enam	nem	enam	enam	enam	six
7	tujuh	tuju	tujo	tujuh	tujuh	seven
8	lapan	lapan	lapan	lapan	delapan	eight
9	sembilan	semilan	hembilan	sembilan	sembilan	nine
10	sepulo	sepulu	hampuloh	sepuloh	sepuluh	ten
11	sebelas	sebelas	hebelas	sebelas	sebelas	eleven
20	due pulo	duo pulu	due puloh	due puloh	dua puluh	twenty
50	lime pulo	limo pulu	lime puloh	lime puloh	lima puluh	fifty
100	seratus	seratuh	heratus	seratus	seratus	one hundred
500	lime ratus	limo ratuh	lime ratus	lime ratus	lima ratus	five hundred
1000	seribu	seribu	heribu	seribu	seribu	one thousand
5000	lime ribu	limo ribu	lime ribu	lime ribu	lima ribu	five thousand
100,000	seratus ribu	seratuh ribu	heratus ribu	seratus ribu	seratus ribu	one hundred thousand
1,000,000	sejute, sekok jute	sejuto, sikok juto	hejute, hikok jute	sejute, sikok jute	sejuta, satu juta	one million

=== Directions ===
Mentok	Belinyu	Toboali	Sungailiat and Pangkalpinang	Indonesian	English
nyi	ni	ini	ni	ini	this
tu	tu	itu	tu	itu	that
sini	sini	hini	sini	sini	here
sane	sano	hane	sane	sana	there
disini	disini	dihini	disini	disini	over here
disane	disano	dihane	disane	disana	over there
kiri	kiri	kiri	kiri	kiri	left
kanan	kanan	kanan	kanan	kanan	right
atas	atas	atas	atas	atas	up
baweh	baweh	baweh	baweh	bawah	down
utara	utaro	utara	utare	utara	north
selatan	selatan	helet	selatan	selatan	south
timur	timur	timur	timur	timur	east
barat	barat	barat	barat	barat	west

=== Personal Pronouns ===
Mentok	Belinyu	Toboali	Sungailiat and Pangkalpinang	Indonesian	English
aku, kami, saye	ku, sayo	aku, saye	ku, saye	aku, saya	I
ikak, kau	kau	engkak	ka, ikak	kamu, engkau	you
kite	kito	kite	kite	kita	we (inclusive)
kami	kamek	kami	kami	kami	we (exclusive)
diorang, jorang	diorang, jorang, mereko	ikak, mereka	diorang, jorang	mereka	they/them
die	nyo, no	die	die, ente	dia	he/she

=== Interrogatives Pronouns ===
Mentok	Belinyu	Toboali	Sungailiat and Pangkalpinang	Indonesian	English
ape	apo	ape	ape	apa	what
siape, sape	sapo	hape	sape	siapa	who
ngape	napo	ngape	ngape	kenapa, mengapa	why
mane	mano	mane	mane	mana	where
sebile	kapan	hebile	sebile	kapan	when
macem mane	macem mano	macem mane	macem mane	bagaimana	how
berape	berapo	berape	berape	berapa	how much

=== Nouns ===
Mentok	Belinyu	Toboali	Sungailiat and Pangkalpinang	Indonesian	English
laki-laki	lanang	laki-laki	laki-laki	laki-laki	men
puan	betino	bini	bini	perempuan	female
mate	mato	mate	mate	mata	eye
idung	idung	idung	idung	hidung	nose
telinge	kuping	bilung	bilong	telinga	ear
kaki	kakik	kaki	kaki	kaki	leg
kulit	kulit	kulit	kulit	kulit	skin
kepale	kepalak	kepale	kepalak	kepala	head
buntut	buntut	buntut	buntut	ekor	tail
aik	aek	aik	aik	air	water
pasir	pasir	pasir	pasir	pasir	sand
mateari	matoari	mateari	mateari	matahari	sun
bulan	bulan	bulan	bulan	bulan	moon
burong	burung	burung	borong	burung	bird
ikan	ikan	ikan	ikan	ikan	fish
kebau	kebu	kerbau	kerbau	kerbau	buffalo
sapi	sapi	hapi	sapi	sapi	cow

=== Verbs ===
Mentok	Belinyu	Toboali	Sungailiat and Pangkalpinang	Indonesian	English
minom	minum	minom	minom	minum	to drink
makan	makan	makan	makan	makan	to eat
gigit	gigit	gigit	gigit	gigit	to bite
liat	liat	tingok	liat	lihat	to see
dengar	denger	denger	denar	dengar	to hear
tiduk	tiduk	tiduk	tiduk	tidur	to sleep
rase	aso, rasa	rase	rase	rasa	to taste
mandik	mandi	mandek	mandik	mandi	to shower
tau	tau	tau	tau	tahu	to know
berenang	berenang	berenang	berenang	berenang	to swim
duduk	duduk	duduk	duduk	duduk	to sit
berik	berek	merek, berek	berik	beri	to give
cium	sium	cium	cium	cium	to kiss
datang	datang	datang	datang	datang	to come
bediri	bediri	bediri	bediri	berdiri	to stand
bejalan	bejalan	bejalan	bejalan	berjalan	walking
becakap	bengomong	becakap	bengomong	berbicara	talking

=== Adjectives ===
Mentok	Belinyu	Toboali	Sungailiat and Pangkalpinang	Indonesian	English
panas	panas	panas	panas	panas	hot
sejuk	dinin	dingin	dingin	dingin, sejuk	cold
penuh	panu	penoh	penoh	penuh	full
baru	baru	baru	baru	baru	new
lame	usan	lame	lame	usang, lama, tua	old
baik	baik	baik	baik	baik	good
rusak	rusak	rusak	rusak	rusak	broken
panjang	panjang	panjang	panjang	panjang	long
basa	basa	basa	basa	basah	wet
tinggi	tinggi	tinggi	tinggi	tinggi	tall
endep	endep	bawa, rendah	rendah, endep	rendah	short
kosong	kosong	kusong	kosong	kosong	empty
sedih	sedi	hedi	sedih	sedih	sad
senang	gembira	heneng	senang	senang, gembira	happy
marah	mara	mara, benci	meranin	marah	angry
berani	berani	berani	berani	berani	brave
takut	takut	takut	takut	takut	scary

== Writing system ==
Bangka Malay was historically written in the Jawi script, also known as Arab-Melayu or Gundul script. This script was introduced during the rule of the Palembang Sultanate in Bangka. In the past, many manuscripts found in Bangka are written in the Jawi script. The usage of the script gradually diminishes during the Dutch colonization, due to the introduction of formal education which uses the Latin script. Today, the use of the Jawi script for day-to-day communication is very rare. It is now primarily reserved for cultural purposes, such as writing calligraphy.

Since the Dutch colonial era, the people of Bangka have predominantly used the Latin script with the Indonesian orthography. Consequently, the orthography in Bangka Malay has undergone several changes. During the Dutch era, the Bangka Malay-speaking community used the Van Ophuijsen Spelling System. From 1947 to 1972, they used the Republican Spelling System. Since 1972, the Bangka Malay-speaking community has been using the Enhanced Spelling System. Nevertheless, the earlier Latin orthographic systems still have a significant influence on the Bangka Malay-speaking community. Many of them, especially the older generation, have not fully adopted the Enhanced Spelling System. The influence of the old orthographic systems is clearly evident in the writing of words containing letters that were replaced by other letters in the Enhanced Spelling System.

There are still many people, possibly a significant number, who write words like cube 'to try', naman 'delicious', and jangui 'chin' with spellings such as chube, nyaman, and djanggu respectively. When writing reduplicated words and prepositions, it appears that many people in Bangka have not yet adopted the Enhanced Spelling System. They write reduplicated words using the numeral two and connect prepositions directly with the following noun. For instance, the phrase dikulamkulam 'in the ponds' is written as dikulam2, which is still based on the old Republican Spelling System, whereas according to the Enhanced Spelling System, it should be written as di kulam-kulam. Therefore, it can be concluded that the Bangka Malay-speaking community has not yet adopted a uniform orthographic system for writing their language with the Latin alphabet.

== Literature ==
Like other Malayic languages, Bangka Malay has a tradition of oral literature in the form of poetry and prose. Each region in Bangka may have its own unique version of oral literature. Oral literature in the form of prose consists of folk tales. Poetry, on the other hand, includes various forms such as pantun, campak, mantra, and jampi. The Bangka Malay pantun has a physical structure consisting of: diction, imagery, concrete words, figurative language, as well as rhyme and rhythm. The meaning in pantun is built through an inner structure consisting of: themes, feelings, tones, as well as atmosphere and message. In Bangka, Pantun serves functions such as communication, cultural identity, embellishment of oral traditions, means of propagation, educational tool, embodiment of customs, entertainment, cultural symbols, fostering heroism, and as a means to enhance humanity among the Bangka Malay community. Campak is a local call-and-response type of pantun used in traditional ceremonies to accompany the Campak dance, a traditional dance originating from Bangka.

Below are some examples of pantuns that originated from Bangka along with its Indonesian and English translation:

Bangka Malay
Miak ko sayang jangen macem ya

Ngape ke dateng ki marah-marah.

Ko dek de tau ujong pangka.

Apa-apa sebeb e.

Sudeh taharu cendane uli

Sudeh la tau betanyak pula.

Amoy yang ki bonceng kemaren lu

Jangen belagek budu.

Indonesian
Adek aku sayang jangan begitu

Kenapa aku datang kamu marah-marah.

Aku tidak tahu ujung pangkalnya

Apa-apa sebabnya.

Sudah gaharu cendana pula

Sudahlah tahu bertanya pula.

Cecek Cina yang kamu bonceng kemaren dulu

Jangan berlagak bodoh.

English
My little brother don't be like that

Why are you getting angry when I am coming.

I don't know the beginning or the end of it

Any reason for it.

Already agarwood and sandalwood as well

You already know yet you still asked.

The Chinese girl you rode with yesterday

Don't act stupid.

== Bibliography ==
- Silahidin, Sofyan; Saleh, YuslizaI; Burhan, Ahyar (1991). Ragam dan Dialek Bahasa Bangka [Varieties and dialects of the Bangka language] (PDF) (in Indonesian). Jakarta: Department of Education and Culture. ISBN 979-459-105-X.
- Mustafa, Zulkarnain; Gani, Zainal Abidin; Silahiddin, Sofian; Saleh, Yuslizal; Aliana, Zainul Arifin (1984). Struktur Bahasa Melayu Bangka [Structure of the Bangka Malay language] (PDF) (in Indonesian). Jakarta: Agency for Language Development and Cultivation.
- Arif, R.M; Nursato, Suwami; Gaffar, Zainal Abidin; Sulainum, H. Mas'ud; Saleh, Yuslizal (1984). Latar Belakang Sosial Bahasa Melayu Bangka [Social Background of the Bangka Malay language] (PDF) (in Indonesian). Jakarta: Agency for Language Development and Cultivation.
- Susilo, Firman (2018). Kamus Bahasa Melayu Bangka – Indonesia [Bangka Malay – Indonesian Dictionary] (PDF) (in Indonesian). Pangkalpinang: Bangka-Belitung Language Center.
