= Banca =

Banca may refer to:

== Places ==
- Bangka Island, an island lying east of Sumatra, part of Indonesia
- Banca, Pyrénées-Atlantiques, a commune of the Pyrénées-Atlantiques département, France
- Banca, Tasmania, a locality in Tasmania, Australia
- Banca, Vaslui, a commune in Vaslui County, Romania
- Banca, a village in Dealu Morii Commune, Bacău County, Romania

== Other ==
- Banca or Bangka (boat), a Philippine outrigger canoe
