= Bangka =

Bangka may refer to:

- Bangka Island, an island of Indonesia
- Bangka Island (North Sulawesi)
- Bangka Regency, Indonesia
- Bangka Strait, a strait of Indonesia
- Wanhua District, Taipei City
- Bangka (boat), Philippine outrigger sailing ships, also spelled banca or panca
- Bangka language, spoken in Indonesia
