= Piotr Bańka =

Polish politician

Councilor of the Silesian Regional Assembly
- Incumbent
- Assumed office 2018

Personal details
- Born: 20 October 1964 (age 61) Myszków
- Party: Law and Justice
- Education: Medical University of Silesia
- Occupation: Doctor, local official, politician

Piotr Bańka (born October 20, 1964, in Myszków) is a doctor, Polish politician and local official.

== Biography ==
He graduated from the Medical University of Silesia.

He is a member of Law and Justice political party in Poland. From 1998 to 2018 Bańka was a councilor of the Myszków County Council. From 2010 to 2014 he was in the executive board of the Myszków County. In 2018 local elections he successfully won the seat of a councilor in the Silesian Regional Assembly.
