= Belinyu =

Belinyu 勿里洋
- District
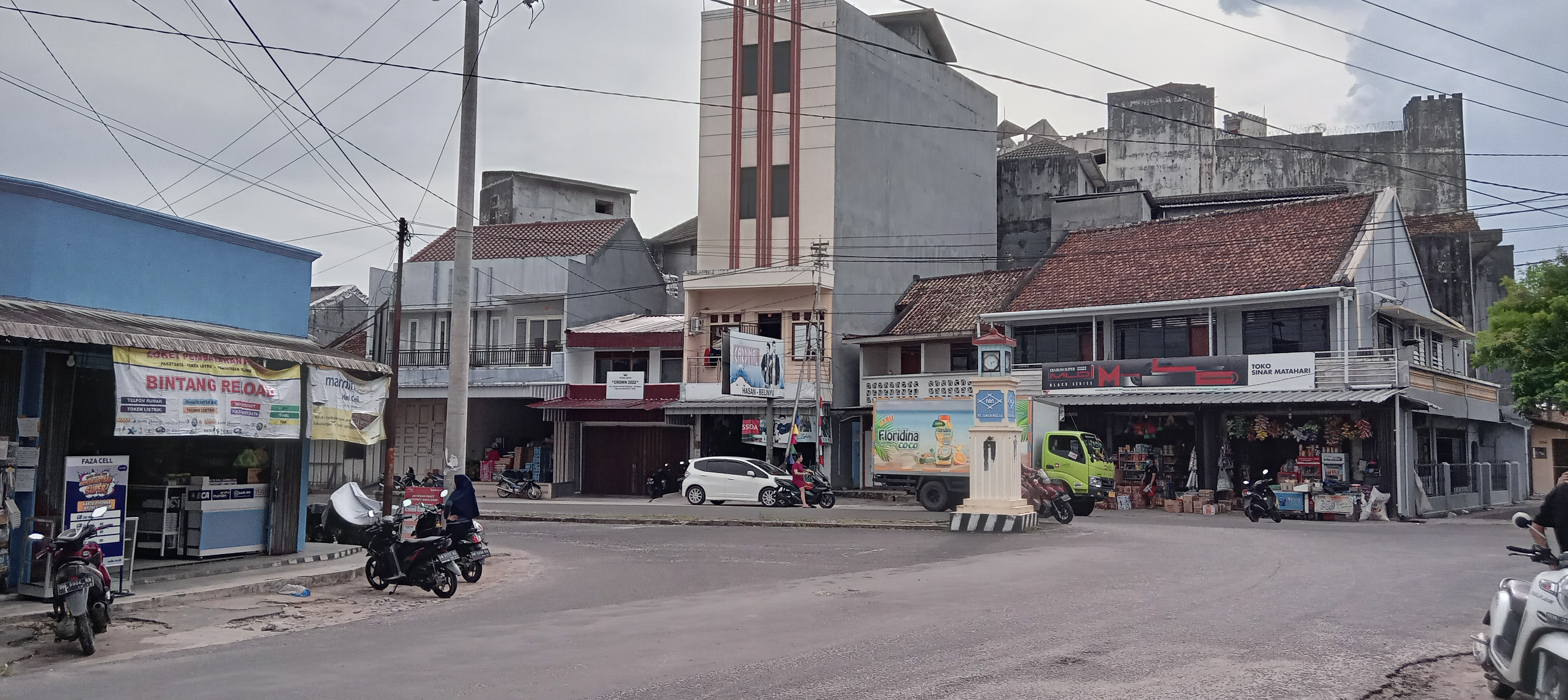
- Gajah Mada street, Belinyu's downtown

- Location of Belinyu in Bangka-Belitung
- Coordinates: 1°38′S 105°46′E
- Country: Indonesia
- Province: Bangka Belitung Islands
- Regency: Bangka Regency

Area
  - Total: 546.5 km^{2} (211.0 sq mi)

Population (2020)
  - Total: 50,200
  - Density: 91.9/km^{2} (238/sq mi)
- Time zone: UTC+7 (Western Indonesia Time)
- Area code: +62717

Belinyu is a town and district (kecamatan) of Bangka Regency, in the Bangka-Belitung province of Indonesia. The district is located on the northern tip of Bangka Island.

== History ==
By the 19th century, tin mines were already operating in Belinyu. Edward Balfour recorded that the mines in Belinyu were established by a Chinese from Palembang, referred to as Demang Ko. In 1919, steam turbines were installed in Mantung (within Belinyu) to supply electrical power to tin mining operations in Bangka.

Following the independence of Indonesia, the island of Bangka was subdivided into five administrative regions (kewedanan). Belinyu was made the seat of the North Bangka kewedanan, and while the other four kewedanan eventually became regencies, Belinyu was absorbed into Bangka Regency.

== Administration ==
Belinyu is subdivided into seven urban villages (kelurahan) and five rural villages (desa).

== Gallery ==
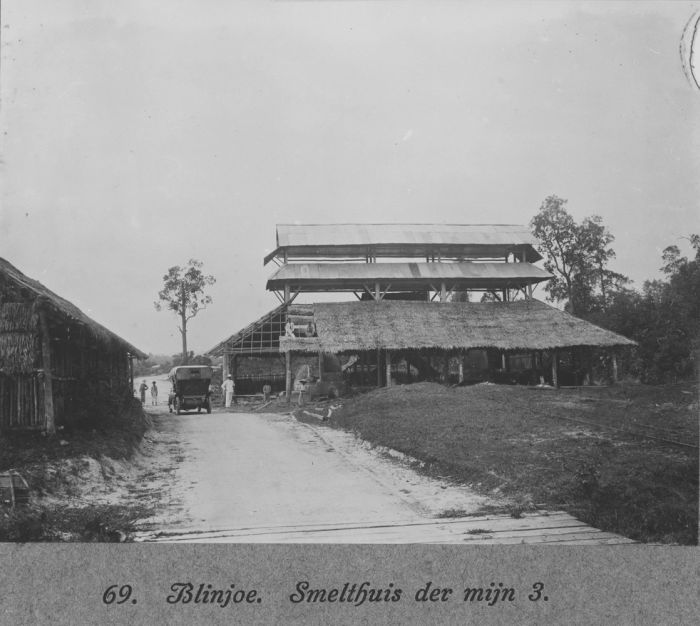
A smelting house in Belinyu (1914).

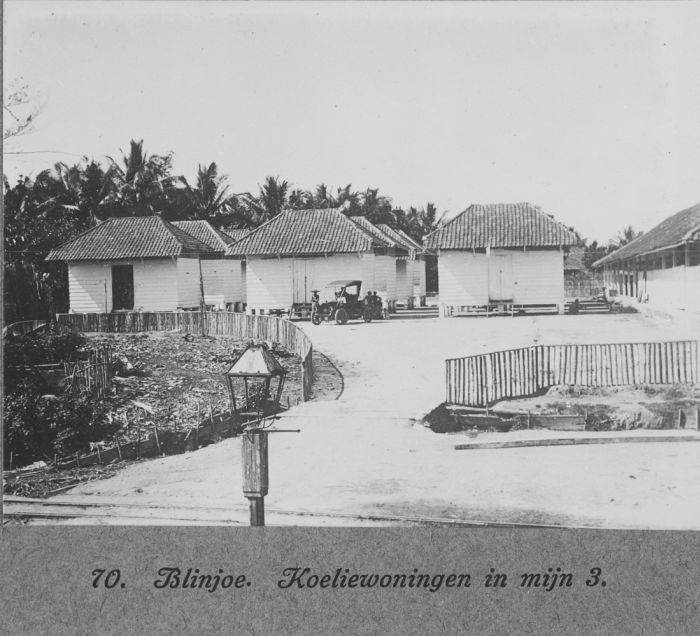
Tin miners' housing in Belinyu during the Dutch period.

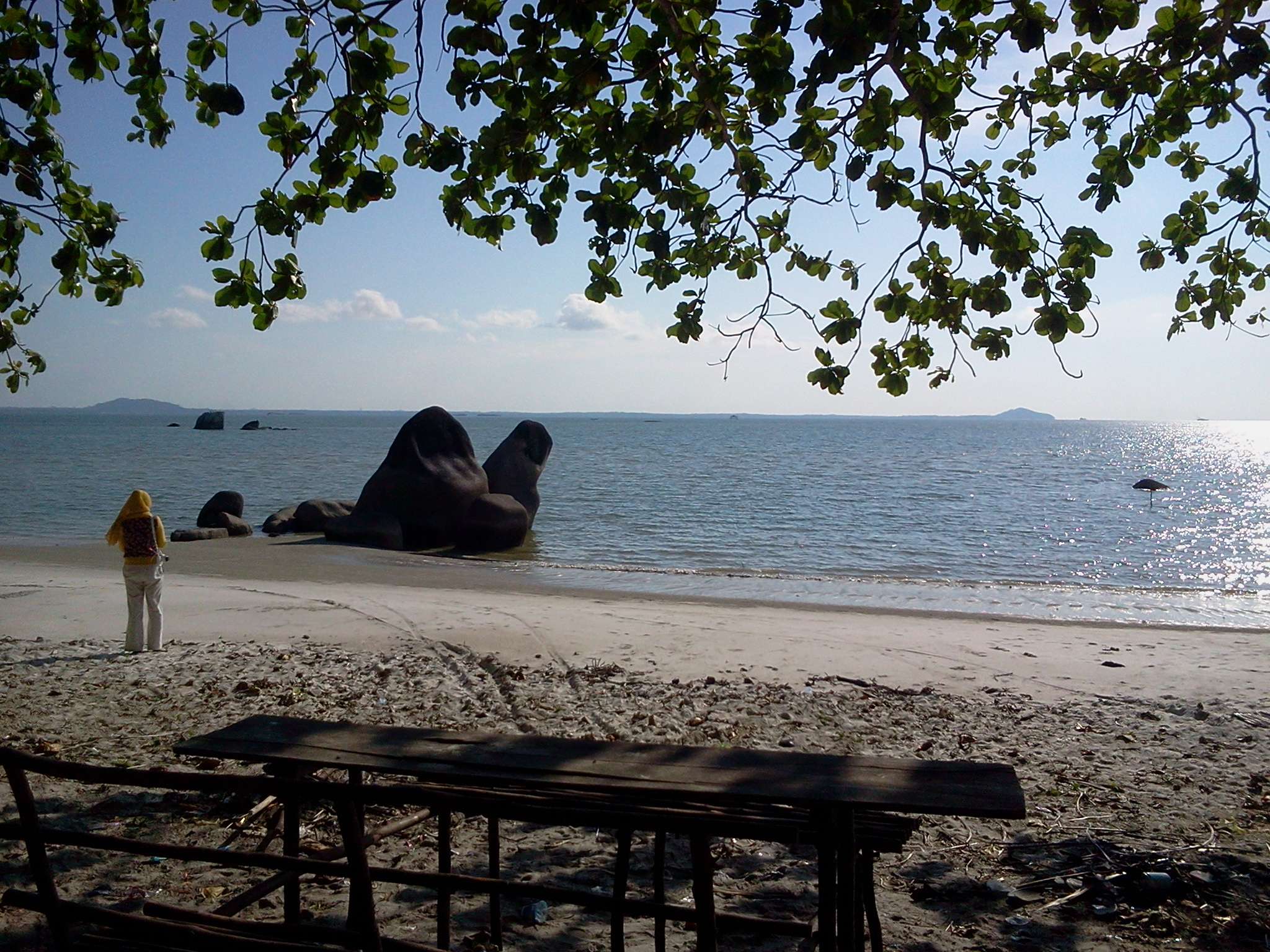
A beach in Belinyu.

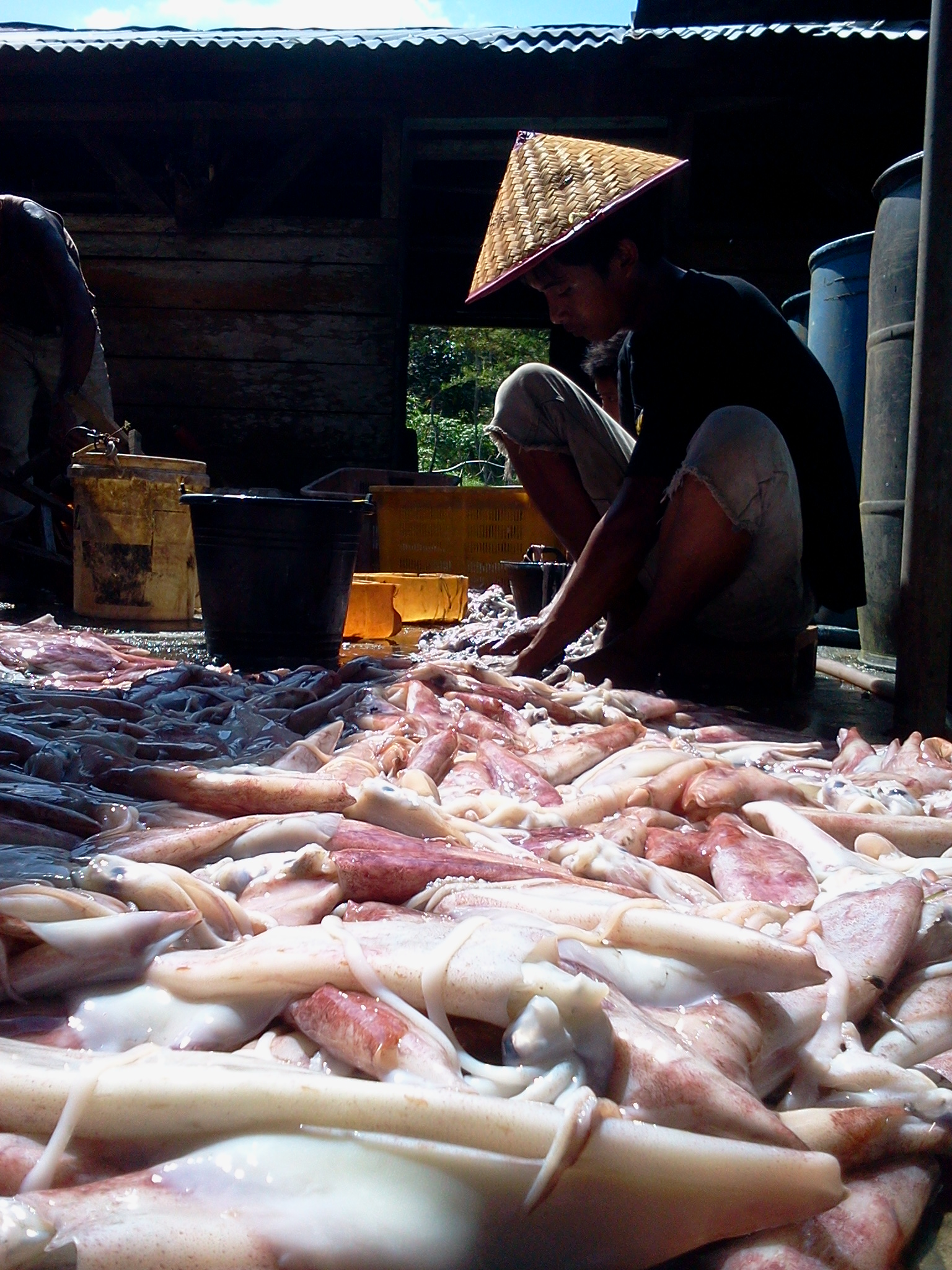
Seafood landed in Belinyu.
