= Banka, Uttar Pradesh =

Banka
- Village
- Location in Uttar Pradesh Banka (India)
- Coordinates: 27°45′42″N 80°11′2″E
- Country: India
- State: Uttar Pradesh
- District: Lakhimpur Kheri District

Banka is a small village, administered as part of Jang Bahadur Ganj village in Lakhimpur Kheri District, Uttar Pradesh, India. It is noted for its temple to the Goddess of English.

== English temple ==
The English temple was built near the Nalanda Public Shiksha Niketan School from April 2010 onwards in black granite and inaugurated on 25 October in honour of the anniversary of Thomas Babington Macaulay, 1st Baron Macaulay's birthday. It contains a Statue of Liberty-inspired statue of the goddess wearing hat and gown, clutching a pen and a guide to the Indian Constitution. A computer screen by its side features the Buddhist Dharmachakra. The walls are adorned with numerous symbols related to the maths and sciences. The purpose of the temple is to promote the English language among the Dalit peoples, which local governors believe crucial to the future success of the area and improving education.
