= Belitung Malay =

Malayic language spoken in Indonesia

- Sedentary Belitung Malay
- base Belitong بهاس بليتوڠ
- Pronunciation: ba.sə bəli.toŋ
- Native to: Indonesia (Bangka Belitung)
- Region: Belitung
- Ethnicity: Belitung Malay, Belitung Chinese, etc.
- Native speakers: 313,047 (2023 estimate)
- Language family: Austronesian: Malayo-Polynesian; (disputed); Malayic; Belitung Malay
- Writing system: Latin (Indonesian alphabet); Jawi (historical)

Language codes
- ISO 639-3: –
- Glottolog: sede1248
- Areas where Belitung Malay is primarily spoken

Belitung Malay (base Belitong, Jawi: بهاس بليتوڠ), or Sedentary Belitung Malay, is a Malayic language spoken in Indonesia, specifically on the island of Belitung in the Bangka Belitung Islands of Sumatra. The language is primarily spoken by the native Malay people of Belitung, as well as by ethnic Chinese who have inhabited Belitung for centuries, using it as a second language alongside their native Hakka. This language is distinguished from Loncong language, another Malay variety spoken by nomadic sea gypsies from Belitung. Additionally, it is spoken by migrants from other parts of Indonesia residing in Belitung, including Javanese and Sundanese, as well as by the Belitung diaspora living in various regions across Indonesia. Belitung Malay serves as the lingua franca among the people of Belitung, encompassing not only Malays but also other ethnic groups living in the island. It is predominantly used in informal settings such as family gatherings or marketplaces. In contrast, standard Indonesian is preferred for formal situations, including government offices and schools, reflecting its status as the official and national language of Indonesia. Code-switching between Belitung Malay and standard Indonesian is common in the Belitung community, particularly in informal and semi-formal contexts. Other ethnic groups, such as the Chinese, also frequently code-switch and code-mix between Hakka and Belitung Malay.

Belitung Malay is a vernacular Malay variety that shares linguistic features with peninsular Malay, Eastern Sumatra Malay, and the Malay variety of West Kalimantan. Belitung Malay exhibits a closer resemblance to the Malay spoken in Sumatra and Kalimantan than to standard Jakarta Indonesian, particularly in terms of phonology and lexicon. The language has received significant influence from other languages, such as Hakka, Dutch and Arabic, as well as Javanese and standard Indonesian. Belitung Malay has absorbed Javanese loanwords due to Belitung's historical rule by the Palembang Sultanate, where the court language, Palembang Malay, was influenced by Javanese. Additionally, Indonesian, as the official language, has also become a source of loanwords. While Belitung Malay includes words not found in standard Indonesian, the two languages are generally mutually intelligible.

== Classification ==
Belitung Malay is a Malayic language. Speakers of Malayic language are spread from Brunei, Indonesia, Malaysia, Singapore, Southern Thailand, to the southernmost part of the Philippines. Malay is a member of the Austronesian family of languages, which includes languages from Taiwan, Southeast Asia and the Pacific Ocean, with a smaller number in continental Asia. Malagasy, a geographic outlier spoken in Madagascar in the Indian Ocean, is also a member of this language family. Although these languages are not necessarily mutually intelligible to any extent, their similarities are often quite apparent. In more conservative languages like Malay, many roots have come with relatively little change from their common ancestor, Proto-Austronesian language. There are many cognates found in the languages' words for kinship, health, body parts and common animals. Numbers, especially, show remarkable similarities.

Belitung Malay is closely related to other Malayic languages spoken in neighboring regions, such as Bangka Malay and Palembang Malay, as well as various Malay varieties found in West Kalimantan, the eastern coast of Sumatra, and outlying islands. Since Indonesian is a standardized form of Malay, Belitung Malay is also related to it, and the two are generally mutually intelligible. However, Belitung Malay possesses unique characteristics, particularly in its phonology and lexicon, that distinguish it from Indonesian and other Malay varieties.

== Geographic distribution and usage ==
Belitung Malay is exclusively spoken on Belitung and its outlying islands. Administratively, this area consists of two regencies in the Bangka Belitung province: Belitung Regency and East Belitung Regency. It is also spoken by Belitung diasporas living in other parts of Indonesia. Belitung Malay is the mother tongue of the Malay people on the island. The Chinese people primarily use Hakka and Mandarin as their native tongues, though many also understand Belitung Malay as a second language and use it to communicate with Malays and other ethnic groups. On the other hand, migrants in Belitung from other parts of Indonesia speak Belitung Malay in addition to their native languages, especially in the market.

Belitung Malay is a spoken language used by Belitung speakers when talking with family members, friends, and co-workers on informal occasions in markets, shops, stalls, and so forth. It also functions as a lingua franca; non-Malay people, such as Chinese and Bugis, among others in the area, often choose to speak Belitung Malay between people from different ethnic groups. Belitung Malay is not used in formal situations in Belitung; it is not taught in schools or used in governmental offices. Instead, Indonesian, the official language of Indonesia, is learned at school. Children are exposed to Indonesian from birth through television, the internet, national ceremonial speeches, magazines, newspapers, books, and other media. Nonetheless, Belitung Malay retains its dominance as an everyday language. Increasing usage of Indonesian has led many Belitung Malay speakers to code-switch and code-mix between standard Indonesian and Belitung Malay.

== Phonology ==
Belitung Malay, like many other regional languages in Indonesia, lacks a standardized phonological system. Nevertheless, many of the phonological system designed for Belitung Malay is loosely based on standard Indonesian orthography.

=== Vowels ===
Like Indonesian and Standard Malay, Belitung Malay possesses 6 phonemic vowels /i, ə, e, a, o, u/.

	Front	Central	Back
Close	i		u
Mid	e	ə	o
Open		a	

Notes:

- In writing, /e/ and /ə/ are both represented as ⟨e⟩.
- Final /a/ in Baku Malay/Indonesian correspond to /ə/ in Belitung Malay, so Baku Malay/Indonesian ada /ada/ "to have" corresponds to Belitung Malay ade /adə/.
- Baku Malay/Indonesian /i/ and /u/ in closed syllables correspond to lower /e/ and /o/ in Belitung Malay, so Baku Malay/Indonesian pasir /pasir/ "sand" and taruh /taruh/ "to place" correspond to Belitung Malay paser /paser/ and tarok /taroʔ/.

=== Consonants ===
Belitung Malay has 19 consonants.

		Labial	Dental	Alveolar	Postalveolar	Velar	Glottal
Nasal		m		n	ɲ	ŋ	
Plosive/ Affricate	voiceless	p		t	t͡ʃ	k	ʔ
Plosive/ Affricate	voiced	b		d	d͡ʒ	ɡ	
Fricative	voiceless			s			
Fricative	voiced			z			
Approximant			l		j	w	
Trill				r			

Notes:

- In writing, the following phonemes are represented as thus:
  - /ŋ/ is ⟨ng⟩
  - /ɲ/ is ⟨ny⟩
  - /t͡ʃ/ is ⟨c⟩
  - /d͡ʒ/ is ⟨j⟩
  - /ʔ/ is ⟨k⟩
  - /j/ is ⟨y⟩
- /ʔ/ only occurs root-finally.
- Unlike Standard Malay and Indonesian, Belitung Malay has no /h/ phoneme.
- Final /ʔ/ in some root words in Belitung Malay correspond to Standard Malay/Indonesian /h/ such as Belitung Malay tarok /taroʔ/ which corresponds to Standard Malay/Indonesian taruh /taruh/ "to place".

=== Diphthongs ===
Belitung Malay features five diphthongs, typically found at the end of words: /ei̯/, /au̯/, /ai̯/, /oi̯/, and /ui̯/. Examples of these diphthongs in use are shown below:

- /ei̯/: /mei̯/ 'May'
- /au̯/: /surau̯/ 'surau'
- /ai̯/: /sampai̯/ 'arrive'
- /oi̯/: /amoi̯/ 'Chinese girls' (from Hakka)
- /ui̯/: /unt͡ʃui̯/ 'pipe'

== Grammar ==
Along with Indonesian, standard Malay, and other Malayic languages, the word order in Belitung Malay is typically subject-verb-object (SVO). While there are notable exceptions, the grammar structure of Belitung Malay shares many similarities with Indonesian and Standard Malay.

=== Affixes ===
Belitung Malay has a number of affixes that can join with the base word to form an affixed word. In Belitung Malay, like other Malayic languages, there are four types of affixes: prefixes, infixes, suffixes and circumfix. Prefixes are affixes attached at the beginning of a word, suffixes are affixes added at the end, and infixes are affixes inserted in the middle. A circumfix or discontinuous affix partly attaches to both the front and back of the base form. Like other Malayic languages, Belitung Malay words consist of a root or a root plus derivational affixes. The root, typically bisyllabic in the shape CV(C)CV(C), serves as the core lexical unit and is usually a noun or verb. Affixes are applied to roots to modify or expand their meaning, creating new words.

==== Prefixes ====
In Belitung Malay, various prefixes alter the meaning of base words differently. The following are examples of common prefixes in Belitung Malay, their meanings, and words:

Prefixes	Meaning	Examples of base words	Examples of derived words
ngeN-	When added to the base form of verbs, it indicates 'performing the action described by the base form'.	itong 'count'	ngitong 'counting'
ngeN-	When added to the base form of verbs, it indicates 'performing the action described by the base form'.	libar 'wide'	ngelibar 'to widen'
ngeN-	When added to the base form of verbs, it indicates 'performing the action described by the base form'.	rusak 'broken'	ngerusak 'to break'
ngeN-	When added to the base form of verbs, it indicates 'performing the action described by the base form'.	ilang 'gone'	ngilang 'to disappear'
ngeN-	When added to the base form of verbs, it indicates 'performing the action described by the base form'.	gigit 'bite'	ngegigit 'to bite'
peN-	When added to the base form of verbs, it denotes 'someone or something that performs the action'.	beriq 'to give'	pemeriq 'giver'
peN-	When added to the base form of verbs, it denotes 'someone or something that performs the action'.	durong 'to push'	pendurong 'pusher'
peN-	When added to the base form of verbs, it denotes 'someone or something that performs the action'.	putong 'to cut'	pemutong 'cutter'
peN-	When added to the base form of verbs, it denotes 'someone or something that performs the action'.	suro 'to instruct'	penyuro 'instructor'
peN-	When added to the base form of verbs, it denotes 'someone or something that performs the action'.	ajar 'to teach'	pengajar 'teacher'
be-	When added to verbs, it signifies 'often performing the action'. With nouns, it denotes 'having', 'ascending', 'wearing', 'engaging in', or 'containing'.	cakap 'talk'	becakap 'to talk'
be-	When added to verbs, it signifies 'often performing the action'. With nouns, it denotes 'having', 'ascending', 'wearing', 'engaging in', or 'containing'.	duit 'money'	beduit 'to have money'
be-	When added to verbs, it signifies 'often performing the action'. With nouns, it denotes 'having', 'ascending', 'wearing', 'engaging in', or 'containing'.	kerje 'job'	bekerje 'to work'
be-	When added to verbs, it signifies 'often performing the action'. With nouns, it denotes 'having', 'ascending', 'wearing', 'engaging in', or 'containing'.	utang 'debt'	berutang 'to owe'
be-	When added to verbs, it signifies 'often performing the action'. With nouns, it denotes 'having', 'ascending', 'wearing', 'engaging in', or 'containing'.	kibit 'hold'	bekibitan 'to hold on'
te-	When added to verbs, it signifies 'completed, unintentional, or capable of performing the action'. With nouns, it means 'to emit', and with adjectives, it indicates 'more'.	ambiq 'to take'	teambiq 'get taken'
te-	When added to verbs, it signifies 'completed, unintentional, or capable of performing the action'. With nouns, it means 'to emit', and with adjectives, it indicates 'more'.	beli 'to buy'	tebeli 'get bought'
te-	When added to verbs, it signifies 'completed, unintentional, or capable of performing the action'. With nouns, it means 'to emit', and with adjectives, it indicates 'more'.	minum 'to drink'	teminum 'get drank'
te-	When added to verbs, it signifies 'completed, unintentional, or capable of performing the action'. With nouns, it means 'to emit', and with adjectives, it indicates 'more'.	bawa 'to bring'	tebawa 'get brought'
te-	When added to verbs, it signifies 'completed, unintentional, or capable of performing the action'. With nouns, it means 'to emit', and with adjectives, it indicates 'more'.	adok 'to mix'	teradok 'get mixed'
de-	When added to the base form of nouns or verbs, it signifies 'to be... by'.	pukul 'to hit'	depukul 'to be hit'
de-	When added to the base form of nouns or verbs, it signifies 'to be... by'.	timbak 'to shoot'	detimbak 'to be shot'
de-	When added to the base form of nouns or verbs, it signifies 'to be... by'.	main 'to play'	demainkan 'to be played'
de-	When added to the base form of nouns or verbs, it signifies 'to be... by'.	jage 'to protect'	dejage 'to be protected'
de-	When added to the base form of nouns or verbs, it signifies 'to be... by'.	gangguq 'to disturb'	degangguq 'to be disturbed'
ke-	When added to the base form of verbs, it means 'to be affected by'. With adjectives, it signifies 'being viewed'.	tue 'old'	ketue 'leader', 'elder'
ke-	When added to the base form of verbs, it means 'to be affected by'. With adjectives, it signifies 'being viewed'.	limaq 'five'	kelimaq 'the fifth'
ke-	When added to the base form of verbs, it means 'to be affected by'. With adjectives, it signifies 'being viewed'.	tige 'three'	ketige 'the third'
ke-	When added to the base form of verbs, it means 'to be affected by'. With adjectives, it signifies 'being viewed'.	ndak 'intend'	kendak 'intention'
ke-	When added to the base form of verbs, it means 'to be affected by'. With adjectives, it signifies 'being viewed'.	tunu 'burn'	ketunu 'burnt'
se-	When added to the base form of verbs, it signifies 'doing an action together with others'. With nouns, it means 'using something together', and with adjectives, it denotes 'similar'.	umaq 'mother'	seumaq 'one mother'
se-	When added to the base form of verbs, it signifies 'doing an action together with others'. With nouns, it means 'using something together', and with adjectives, it denotes 'similar'.	berat 'heavy'	seberat 'as heavy as'
se-	When added to the base form of verbs, it signifies 'doing an action together with others'. With nouns, it means 'using something together', and with adjectives, it denotes 'similar'.	jat 'evil	sejat 'as evil as'
se-	When added to the base form of verbs, it signifies 'doing an action together with others'. With nouns, it means 'using something together', and with adjectives, it denotes 'similar'.	masin 'salty'	semasin 'as salty as'
se-	When added to the base form of verbs, it signifies 'doing an action together with others'. With nouns, it means 'using something together', and with adjectives, it denotes 'similar'.	tetaq 'cut'	setetaw 'one cut'
ku-	When added to the base form of verbs, it indicates 'ownership' or 'possession'. It is equivalent to 'my' or 'mine' in English.	makan 'to eat'	kumakan 'I eat'
ku-	When added to the base form of verbs, it indicates 'ownership' or 'possession'. It is equivalent to 'my' or 'mine' in English.	antar 'to send'	kuantar 'I send'
ku-	When added to the base form of verbs, it indicates 'ownership' or 'possession'. It is equivalent to 'my' or 'mine' in English.	cariq 'to find'	kucariq 'I find'
ku-	When added to the base form of verbs, it indicates 'ownership' or 'possession'. It is equivalent to 'my' or 'mine' in English.	beriq 'to give'	kuberiq 'I give'
ku-	When added to the base form of verbs, it indicates 'ownership' or 'possession'. It is equivalent to 'my' or 'mine' in English.	gantong 'to hang'	kugantong 'I hang'

==== Suffixes ====
Like prefixes, suffixes in Belitung Malay also alter the meaning of base words in various ways. The following are examples of common suffixes in Belitung Malay, their meanings, and some words:

Suffixes	Meaning	Examples of base words	Examples of derived words
-an	When added to the base form of verbs, it signifies 'tool or result of performing the action indicated by the base form'.	main 'to play'	mainan 'toys'
-an	When added to the base form of verbs, it signifies 'tool or result of performing the action indicated by the base form'.	makan 'to eat'	makanan 'food'
-an	When added to the base form of verbs, it signifies 'tool or result of performing the action indicated by the base form'.	pikir 'to think'	pikiran 'thoughts'
-an	When added to the base form of verbs, it signifies 'tool or result of performing the action indicated by the base form'.	cuci 'to wash'	cucian 'laundry'
-an	When added to the base form of verbs, it signifies 'tool or result of performing the action indicated by the base form'.	potong 'to cut'	potongan 'pieces'
-eq	When added to the base form of verbs, it signifies that the action described by the verb is directed towards or affecting an object.	limpar 'to throw'	limpareq 'to throw at something'
-eq	When added to the base form of verbs, it signifies that the action described by the verb is directed towards or affecting an object.	tanam 'to plant'	tanameq 'to plant at something'
-eq	When added to the base form of verbs, it signifies that the action described by the verb is directed towards or affecting an object.	tulis 'to write'	tuliseq 'to write at something'
-eq	When added to the base form of verbs, it signifies that the action described by the verb is directed towards or affecting an object.	kumpul 'to gather'	kumpuleq 'to gather something'
-eq	When added to the base form of verbs, it signifies that the action described by the verb is directed towards or affecting an object.	datang 'to visit'	datangeq 'to visit someone/something'
-kan	When added to the base form of verbs, it signifies 'to put into or to make into'. With adjectives, it means 'to make more'.	banyak 'many'	banyakkan 'to add more'
-kan	When added to the base form of verbs, it signifies 'to put into or to make into'. With adjectives, it means 'to make more'.	buat 'to make'	buatkan 'make it'
-kan	When added to the base form of verbs, it signifies 'to put into or to make into'. With adjectives, it means 'to make more'.	angkat to carry'	angkatkan 'carry it'
-kan	When added to the base form of verbs, it signifies 'to put into or to make into'. With adjectives, it means 'to make more'.	turut 'to follow'	turutkan 'follow it'
-kan	When added to the base form of verbs, it signifies 'to put into or to make into'. With adjectives, it means 'to make more'.	isiq 'to fill'	isiqkan 'fill it'
-e	When added to the base form of verbs or adjectives, it denotes to 'something related to the matter mentioned in the base form'.	banyak 'many'	banyake 'so many'
-e	When added to the base form of verbs or adjectives, it denotes to 'something related to the matter mentioned in the base form'.	nakal 'naughty'	nakale 'so naughy'
-e	When added to the base form of verbs or adjectives, it denotes to 'something related to the matter mentioned in the base form'.	ruma 'house'	rumae 'his/her house'
-e	When added to the base form of verbs or adjectives, it denotes to 'something related to the matter mentioned in the base form'.	ramai 'crowded'	ramaie 'so crowded'
-e	When added to the base form of verbs or adjectives, it denotes to 'something related to the matter mentioned in the base form'.	bagus 'good	baguse 'so good'

==== Infixes ====
In Belitung Malay, infixation of a base word typically signifies 'many or multiple' of that particular base word. The following are some examples of common infixes used in Belitung Malay:

Infixes	Examples of base words	Examples of derived words
-el-	kupor 'sound of fish jumping on the water'	kelupor 'sound of many fishes jumping on the water'
-el-	juntai 'swinging'	jeluntai 'many people swinging'
-em-	guro 'thunder'	gemuro 'many thunders'
-em-	tali 'rope'	temali 'many ropes'
-em-	telepor 'sound of something falling on the floor'	temelepor 'sound of many things falling on the floor'
-er-	gigi 'tooth'	gerigi 'many teeth'
-er-	gebos 'surprising sound'	gerebos 'many surprising sounds'

==== Circumfixes ====
There are several circumfixes in Belitung Malay, each with its own specific meanings. The following are some examples of common circumfixes used in Belitung Malay:

Circumfixes	Meaning	Examples of base words	Examples of derived words
be-....-an	When added to the base form of verbs or adjectives, it signifies 'state', 'condition', or 'result of the action or process denoted by the base word'.	kibit 'to hold'	bekibitan 'to hold one another'
be-....-an	When added to the base form of verbs or adjectives, it signifies 'state', 'condition', or 'result of the action or process denoted by the base word'.	dekat 'near'	berdekatan 'to be near each another'
be-....-an	When added to the base form of verbs or adjectives, it signifies 'state', 'condition', or 'result of the action or process denoted by the base word'.	jao 'far'	bejaoan 'to be far from one another'
be-....-an	When added to the base form of verbs or adjectives, it signifies 'state', 'condition', or 'result of the action or process denoted by the base word'.	juntai 'to swing'	bejuntaian 'to swing with one another'
peN-....-an	When added to the base form of verbs, it signifies 'actions', 'processes', 'results', or 'objects' related to the base word.	kubor 'to bury'	penguboran 'burial'
peN-....-an	When added to the base form of verbs, it signifies 'actions', 'processes', 'results', or 'objects' related to the base word.	timbak 'to shoot'	penimbakan 'shooting'
peN-....-an	When added to the base form of verbs, it signifies 'actions', 'processes', 'results', or 'objects' related to the base word.	tulong 'to assist'	petulongan 'assistance'
peN-....-an	When added to the base form of verbs, it signifies 'actions', 'processes', 'results', or 'objects' related to the base word.	cariq 'to search'	pencariqan 'searching'
ke-....-an	When added to the base form of adjectives, it signifies 'too' or 'the state or quality' of the base word.	aus 'thirsty'	keausan 'thirst', 'too thirsty'
ke-....-an	When added to the base form of adjectives, it signifies 'too' or 'the state or quality' of the base word.	lapar 'hungry'	kelaparan 'hunger', 'too hungry'
ke-....-an	When added to the base form of adjectives, it signifies 'too' or 'the state or quality' of the base word.	jujor 'honest'	kejujoran 'honesty', 'too honest'
ke-....-an	When added to the base form of adjectives, it signifies 'too' or 'the state or quality' of the base word.	keciq 'small'	kekeqian 'smallness', 'too small'
se-....-e	When added to the base form of adjectives, it signifies 'completeness' or 'entirety' of the base word.	bagus 'good'	sebaguse 'as good as possible'
se-....-e	When added to the base form of adjectives, it signifies 'completeness' or 'entirety' of the base word.	keciq 'small'	sekeciqe 'as small as possible'
se-....-e	When added to the base form of adjectives, it signifies 'completeness' or 'entirety' of the base word.	cepat 'fast'	secepate 'as fast as possible'
se-....-e	When added to the base form of adjectives, it signifies 'completeness' or 'entirety' of the base word.	gede 'large'	segedee 'as large as possible'
ngeN-....-kan	When added to the base form of verbs or adjectives, it indicates 'causing someone or something to perform the action denoted by the base word'.	cariq 'to find'	ngencariqkan 'to find for'
ngeN-....-kan	When added to the base form of verbs or adjectives, it indicates 'causing someone or something to perform the action denoted by the base word'.	dudok 'to sit'	ngendudokkan 'to sit for'
ngeN-....-kan	When added to the base form of verbs or adjectives, it indicates 'causing someone or something to perform the action denoted by the base word'.	waris 'inherit'	ngewariskan 'to inherit for'
ngeN-....-kan	When added to the base form of verbs or adjectives, it indicates 'causing someone or something to perform the action denoted by the base word'.	limpar 'to throw'	ngelimparkan 'to throw for'
ngeN-....-eq	When added to the base form of verbs, it indicates 'doing at something'.	masok 'to enter'	ngemasokeq 'to enter something'
ngeN-....-eq	When added to the base form of verbs, it indicates 'doing at something'.	tanam 'to plant'	ngetanameq 'to plant something'
ngeN-....-eq	When added to the base form of verbs, it indicates 'doing at something'.	limpar 'to throw'	ngelimpareq 'to throw something'
ngeN-....-eq	When added to the base form of verbs, it indicates 'doing at something'.	gusok 'to brush'	ngegusokeq 'to brush something'
de-....-kan	When added to the base form of verbs, it indicates ' action done to or for someone or something'.	tulis 'to write'	detuliskan 'to be written by'
de-....-kan	When added to the base form of verbs, it indicates ' action done to or for someone or something'.	cariq 'to find'	decariqkan 'to be found by'
de-....-kan	When added to the base form of verbs, it indicates ' action done to or for someone or something'.	terbang 'to fly'	deterbangkan 'to be flown by'
de-....-kan	When added to the base form of verbs, it indicates ' action done to or for someone or something'.	beli 'to buy'	debelikan 'to be bought by'
de-....-eq	When added to the base form of verbs or nouns, it indicates 'action is done to or directed towards an object'.	bace 'to read'	debaceeq 'to be read'
de-....-eq	When added to the base form of verbs or nouns, it indicates 'action is done to or directed towards an object'.	cakap 'talk'	decakapeq 'to be criticized'
de-....-eq	When added to the base form of verbs or nouns, it indicates 'action is done to or directed towards an object'.	sakit 'hurt'	desakiteq 'to be hurt'
de-....-eq	When added to the base form of verbs or nouns, it indicates 'action is done to or directed towards an object'.	limpar to throw'	delimpareq 'to be thrown'

=== Reduplication ===
There are several types of reduplication in Belitung Malay: full reduplication, reduplication of base forms in complex words, reduplication with affixation, and reduplication with phoneme replacement. Reduplication in Belitung Malay serves various purposes depending on the type of word. For nouns, it indicates pluralization or resemblance to something. Verbs use reduplication to denote reciprocal actions, repetitive actions, leisurely actions, or intensity. Adjectives use it to signify a high degree or intensity. Lastly, numerals use reduplication to express collectivity.

In full reduplication, the entire base form is repeated without phoneme changes or the addition of affixes. For example:

- itam-itam 'black-black'
- pute-pute 'white-white'
- mikaq-mikaq 'you guys'
- keciq-keciq 'small-small'

Reduplication of base forms in complex words is the repetition of affixed words where only the base form is repeated. This type of reduplication in Belitung Malay occurs in affixed words such as:

- ngeliat-liat 'to see around'
- deputong-putong 'to cut into pieces'
- berjalan-jalan 'to walk around'
- kelimaq-limaqe 'all five of them'
- teantok-antok 'to bump repeatedly'
- sekampong-kampong 'the whole village'
- keciq-keciqan 'small scale'
- takut-takuteq 'to scare repeatedly'
- dekat-dekatkan 'to get closer repeatedly'
- cucuq-cucuqe 'his/her grandchildren'

Repetition with affixation involves repetition of the base form occurs with the addition of affixes, usually circumfixes or separate affixes. For example:

- setakut-takute 'as scared as possible'
- sedernun-demune 'as cold as possible'
- kemira-miraan 'reddish'
- keijau-ijauan 'greenish'
- seade-adee 'just as it is'

Reduplication with phoneme substitution is the reduplication of the base form accompanied by the alteration of phonemes within that base form. For example:

- kesanaq-kesineq 'going here and there'
- cual-cuil 'pruning around'
- telepar-telepor 'many loud sounds'
- seradak-seruduk 'bumping here and there'
- puntang-perenang 'chaotic and disarray'
- gerebas-gerebus 'many surprising sounds'

=== Nouns ===
In Belitung Malay nouns can be divided into human nouns, animal nouns or neither. Human nouns are nouns that use the measuring word urang 'person' as a unit indicator, for example:

- cucuq 'grandchild'
- biaq 'child', 'kid'
- guru 'teacher'
- kawan 'friend'
- sedare 'sibling', 'cousin'

Animal nouns are nouns that use the measuring word ikoq 'tail' as a unit indicator, for example:

- burong 'bird'
- ikan 'fish'
- kerbau 'buffalo'
- sapi 'cow'

Examples of other nouns are:

- mate 'eye'
- mije 'table'
- kersi 'chair'
- ruma 'house'
- tandok 'horn'

=== Verbs ===
Verbs in Belitung Malay can be categorized into intransitive verbs, ditransitive verbs, and transitive verbs. Transitive verbs are further subdivided into passive and antipassive transitive verbs. Examples of intransitive verbs include:

- pegi 'to go'
- tiduq 'to sleep'
- bebulaq 'to lie'
- nagis 'to cry'

Example of ditransitive verbs include:

- melikan 'to buy for'
- ngambiqkan 'to take for'
- ngencariqkan 'to find for'
- nunjokkan 'to show for'

Example of passive transitive verbs include:

- ngibit 'to hold'
- tulis 'to write'
- nenameq 'to name'
- ngerusakkan 'to break'

Example of antipassive transitive verbs include:

- betanam 'to plant'
- berutang 'to owe (money)'
- berburu 'to hunt'
- bemain 'to play'

=== Adjectives ===
Adjectives in Belitung Malay are words that can be preceded by words such as agaq 'somewhat', lebe 'more', paling 'most' or followed by the word amat 'very'. For example:

- lebe mura 'cheaper'
- lebe mahal 'more expensive'
- lebe deras 'faster'
- lebe kutor 'dirtier'
- paling keciq 'smallest'

=== Numerals ===
Numerals can be divided into definite and indefinite numerals. Example of definite numerals are:

- sikok 'one'
- duaq 'two'
- sepulo 'ten'
- numor tige 'number three'
- numor lapan 'number eight'

Examples of indefinite numerals are:

- semua 'all'
- banyak 'many'
- sikit 'a little'

=== Pronouns ===
Pronouns in Belitung Malay can be divided into personal pronouns, demonstrative pronouns and interrogative pronouns.

==== Personal pronouns ====
This table shows an overview over the most commonly and widely used personal pronouns in Belitung Malay.

Person	Singular	Plural		
Person	Singular	Neutral	Exclusive	Inclusive
1st person	aku, saye		kameq	kite
2nd person	kau	sidaq semue, mikaq semue		
3rd person	die, nya	die-die, mereke, bundie		

The pronouns aku and saya both mean 'I', with saya typically used in more formal contexts. The pronouns kameq and kite both mean 'we', but kameq is exclusive, while kite is inclusive.

==== Demonstrative pronouns ====
Like Indonesian and Standard Malay, there are two demonstrative pronouns in Belitung Malay, ini 'this' and itu 'that'. The usage of these words are shown below：

- Berape rege tupi ini? 'How much is the cost of this coffee?'
- Punye sape ketangin ini? 'Whose bicycle is this?'
- Biyaq itu la tiduq siang. 'That child already took an afternoon nap'
- Kameq ngembuno sabaq itu. 'We already killed that snake.'

==== Interrogative pronouns ====
Examples of interrogative pronouns in Belitung Malay include ape 'what', sape 'who', kiape 'how', berape 'how much', sebile 'when', kemane 'where' and ngape 'why'. The usage of these words are shown below：

- Sape pegi kesanaq kemarin? 'Who went there yesterday?'
- Kiape jejake itu? 'How's that guy?'
- Umaq ngembeli durin berape? 'How many durians did mother bought?'
- Sebile die ndak belanje? 'When is she going shopping?'
- Kemane kau ndak berangkat? 'Where are you going?'
- Ngape bundie ndaq kesekula? 'Why are they not going to school?'

== Vocabulary ==
The vocabulary of Belitung Malay is notably distinct from Indonesian and Standard Malay. While many words are similar, Belitung Malay includes unique lexicon not found in Indonesian or other Malayic languages. For example, words such as umaq 'mother', bundie 'they', and ngayak 'very' are unique to Belitung Malay and not found in Indonesian. Due to the legacy of the Palembang Sultanate's rule in Belitung, Belitung Malay has also received influence from Palembang Malay. Through Palembang Malay, Belitung Malay has also absorbed several loanwords from Javanese. Words such as gawe 'to work', jungor 'mouth', and kuping 'ear' are examples of loanwords indirectly borrowed from Javanese via Palembang Malay. Lastly, similar to other regional languages in Indonesia, the introduction of Indonesian as the national language has influenced the vocabulary of Belitung Malay. As Indonesian influence grows, many people in Belitung have gradually embraced Indonesian and replaced certain words in Belitung Malay with their Indonesian equivalents.

In addition, the lexicon of Belitung Malay has been influenced by other languages, such as Hakka, Arabic and Dutch. Hakka entered Belitung Malay due to influx of Chinese migrants from Guangdong in the 19th century, while Dutch loanwords on the other hand entered Belitung Malay through colonization. Arabic loanwords on the other hand entered Belitung Malay through the spread of Islam in Indonesia and the historical rule of the Palembang Sultanate in Belitung. Similar to Bangka Malay, Belitung Malay has absorbed a significant number of loanwords from Hakka due to the substantial presence of Chinese communities in the Bangka-Belitung. Example of Hakka loanwords in Belitung Malay are amoy 'Chinese girls' (from 阿妹 â-moi), tanglong 'lantern' (from 燈籠 tên-lùng) and fannyin 'Malay' (from 番人 fân-ngìn). There are also Dutch loanwords in Belitung Malay. Some Dutch words not commonly found in standard Indonesian include uto 'car', potlot 'pencil', and perlop 'work leave'. Lastly, Arabic-derived words are mostly Islamic-related terms, such as jakat 'zakat' (from زكاة zakāt), aji 'hajj' (from حَجّ ḥajj) and nazar 'motive' (from نظر nazar).

Below are examples of commonly used Belitung Malay vocabulary in various dialects, along with their Indonesian and English translations:

=== Numerals ===
Number	Belitung Malay	Indonesian	English
1	sikoq	satu	one
2	duaq	dua	two
3	tige	tiga	three
4	mpat	empat	four
5	limaq	lima	five
6	nam	enam	six
7	tujo	tujuh	seven
8	lapan	delapan	eight
9	sembilan	sembilan	nine
10	sepulo	sepuluh	ten
11	sebelas	sebelas	eleven
20	duaq pulo	dua puluh	twenty
50	limaq pulo	lima puluh	fifty
100	seratus	seratus	one hundred
500	limaq ratus	lima ratus	five hundred
1000	seghibuseribu	seribu	one thousand
5000	limaq ribu	lima ribu	five thousand
100,000	seratus ribu	seratus ribu	one hundred thousand
1,000,000	sejuta, sikoq juta	sejuta, satu juta	one million

=== Directions ===
Belitung Malay	Indonesian	English
ini	ini	this
itu	itu	that
sineq	sini	here
sanaq	situ, sana	there
disineq	disini	over here
disanaq	disitu, disana	over there
kiriq	kiri	left
kanan	kanan	right
atas	atas	up
bawah	bawah	down
utara	utara	north
selatan	selatan	south
timur	timur	east
barat	barat	west

=== Personal pronouns ===
Belitung Malay	Indonesian	English
aku, sayo	aku, saye	I, me
anda	anda	you (formal)
kau	kamu	you (informal)
die, nya	dia	he/she
kameq	kami	we (exclusive)
kite	kita	we (inclusive)
die-die, mereke, bundie	mereka	they/them

=== Interrogatives pronouns ===
Belitung Malay	Indonesian	English
sape	siapa	who
ape	apa	what
ngape	kenapa, mengapa	why
mane, dimane	mana, dimana	where, if
sebile	kapan	when
kiape	gimana, bagaimana	how
berape	berapa	how much

=== Nouns ===
Belitung Malay	Indonesian	English
aiq	air	water
puhon	pohon	tree
paser	pasir	sand
ruma	rumah	house
gunong	gunung	mountain
sungai	sungai	river
sayor	sayur	vegetable
teluq	telur	egg
jalan	jalan	road
kembang	bunga	flower
benatang	binatang	animal
urang	orang	people, person
burong	burung	bird

=== Verbs ===
Belitung Malay	Indonesian	English
makan	makan	to eat
minum	minum	to drink
tiduq	tidur	to sleep
tulong	tolong	to help
gigit	gigit	to bite
menyintaeq	menyintai	to love
gawe	bekerja	to work
mandiq	mandi	to shower
dengar	dengar	to listen
liat	lihat	to see
ngembuno	rnembunuh	to kill
ngendengar	mendengar	to listen
ngenggusok	menggosok	to brush
nuci, nesa	mencuci	to wash

=== Adjectives ===
Belitung Malay	Indonesian	English
pindek	pendek	short
busok	busuk	rotten
berat	berat	heavy
panjang	panjang	long
demun	dingin	cold
peno	penuh	full
pute	putih	white
angat	hangat	warm
basaq	basah	wet
kering	kering	dry
libar	lebar	wide
kutor	kotor	dirty
jao	jauh	far
banyaq	banyak	many
tue	tua	old

== Writing system ==
Similar to Bangka Malay and Palembang Malay, Belitung Malay historically was written in the Jawi script, also known as Arab-Melayu or Gundul script. Jawi entered Belitung during the rule of the Palembang Sultanate, as part of the spread of Islam in the Indonesian archipelago. Manuscripts and other artifacts discovered in Belitung from the past were predominantly written in Jawi. However, the usage of the Jawi script has declined following the introduction of the Latin script by the Dutch during the colonial era. Today, the usage of the Jawi script in Belitung is extremely rare. Belitung Malay is now predominantly written in the Latin script. When written, like other regional languages in Indonesia, Belitung Malay usually follow the Indonesian orthography, which is the official spelling system used in the Indonesian language.

== Literature ==
Like other Malayic languages, Belitung Malay has a rich tradition of oral literature. Oral literature in Belitung Malay encompasses a variety of elements, including traditional expressions, folk poetry, and folk prose tales. Traditional expressions can be divided into proverbs, idioms, parables, and wise sayings. Proverbs are metaphors used to say something precisely in a short sentence with the aim of interrupting someone's conversation. Examples of proverbs in Belitung Malay are:

- Decucon ndaq ngimut 'stabbed and still willing to comply (meaning: someone who is already resigned)'
- Namburoq gunong 'piling up mountains' (meaning: someone who is capable or wealthy)'
- Ngenggarameq aiq laut 'salt the sea' (meaning: someone who likes to praise themselves)'

Idioms are figurative expressions spoken using short sentences. Idioms in Belitung Malay are called perbase. Examples of idioms in Belitung are:

- Tampar anak sinder benantu 'slap the child, satirize the son-in-law (meaning: someone who criticizes or blames someone else unjustly or without reason)'
- Masoq de kandang kambing ngembeq, masoq de kandang ayam bekukoq 'entering the goat pen, one should bleat; entering the chicken coop, one should crow (meaning: adapting to one's surroundings or adjusting behavior accordingly)'
- Jao ki macan, dekat ke belacan 'far like a tiger, close like shrimp paste (meaning: someone who pretends to be brave but is actually timid)'

Similes are sentences that compare or liken something, such as a person's beauty or character, to the surrounding natural environment. Parables in Belitung Malay oral literature usually begin with the word 'ki' meaning 'like'. Example of parables are:

- Ki Kunyit kan kapor 'like turmeric with chalk (meaning: a harmonious state)'
- Ki tempalaq desiuleq 'like a catfish in a net (meaning: someone who is confused)'
- Ki nuangkan aiq bang keranjang rubus 'like pouring water into a leaky basket (meaning: someone who is greedy)

Wise words are words or sentences containing advice spoken by someone (usually older) to another person so that the person being advised behaves kindly towards others. Examples of wise words are:

- Balak jangan decariq, rezeki jangan detulaq 'danger should not be sought, and blessings should not be rejected (meaning: one must be careful in this life)'
- Jangan ngelangkaq benang arang, itam telapaq kaki 'Don't step over the burnt thread, blacken your feet (meaning: don't disobey your elders' advice, or you'll face danger)'
- Jangan nyukor kepala orang tua 'Don't shave the head of your elders" (meaning: don't bring shame to your parents or elders)'

There are various forms of folk poetry in Belitung Malay, including campaq, pantun, and mantra. Campaq in Belitung Malay means 'discard'; it involves the recitation of pantun during the campaq dance, a traditional dance native to Bangka-Belitung. There are two types of campaq: campaq darat, or 'land campaq', predominantly performed by native Malays of Belitung, and campaq laut, or 'sea campaq', traditionally performed by the Orang Laut, sea nomads inhabiting the coastal regions of Belitung. Similar to other Malay dialects, traditional oral literature in Belitung Malay also includes the pantun, often encountered in the social interactions of young people. Below are some examples of pantuns that originated from Belitung along with its Indonesian and English translation:

Belitung Malay
Jangan sukaq main pelita

Pelite itu besumbu kain.

Jangan sukaq bemain cinte.

Kaluq tidak berani kawin.

Mun ujan ujan sekali

Biar kameq betudung kain.

Mun buang buang sekali

Biar kameq nyariq noq lain.

Terang bulan ngenggaliq ubi

Ubi degaliq de dalam puan.

Burong terebang membawaq kunci

Kunci pembukaq atimu tuan

Indonesian
Jangan suka main pelita

Pelita itu bersumbu kain.

Jangan suka bermain cinta

Kalau tidak berani kawin.

Kalau hujan hujan sekali

Biar kami bertudung kain.

Kalau buang buang sekali

Biar kami cari yang lain.

Terang bulan menggali ubi

Ubi digali di dalam puan.

Burung terbang membawa kunci

Kunci pembuka hatimu tuan.

English
Don't play with oil lamps

An oil lamp with a cotton wick.

Don't play with love

If you're not ready for commitment.

If it rains heavily once

Let us cover ourselves with cloth.

If you discard once

Let us find another.

The bright moon digs sweet potatoes

Dug within the lady.

A flying bird carries a key

The key to unlock your heart, sir.

A mantra consists of words or phrases imbued with mystical power, spoken in rhythmic language. Mantras are believed to harness supernatural forces through the energy of sound inherent in each chosen word. The language of mantras is sometimes unknown in meaning. In the oral literature of Belitung Malay, there are several types of mantras such as kemat and jampi. Kemat is a mantra used by young people, typically girls to boys, to make someone interested and fall in love with them. Kemat can be used by holding three betel leaves, through food, and also by using a cut from the nails of hands. Meanwhile, Jampi is a type of mantra used to heal people. There are various types of Jampi recited for different ailments, such as eyelid twitching or food stuck in the esophagus.

== Bibliography ==
- Miyake, Yoshimi; Hendry, Sarman; Fithrorozi (2022). "A preliminary study of Belitung Malay". NUSA: Linguistic Studies of Languages in and Around Indonesia. 72: 17. doi:10.15026/120254.
- Napsin, Syahrul; Usman, M. Yusuf; Zein, R.M. Syafruddin; Sudarmo; Tarmizi; Silahiddin, Sofyan (1986). Morfologi dan Sintaksis Bahasa Melayu Belitung [Morphology and Syntax of Belitung Malay] (PDF) (in Indonesian). Jakarta: Agency for Language Development and Cultivation.
- Aliana, Zainal Arifin; Arifin, Siti Salamah; Mairu, Tannizi; As'ad, Nurbaya; Maspriyadi (1992). Sastra Lisan Bahasa Melayu Belitung [Oral Literature of Belitung Malay] (PDF) (in Indonesian). Jakarta: Agency for Language Development and Cultivation. ISBN 979-459-199-8.
- Arifin, Siti Salamah; Abubakar, Tannizi; Alwi, Zahra (2002). Sistem Reduplikasi Bahasa Melayu Belitung [Reduplication System of Belitung Malay] (PDF) (in Indonesian). Jakarta: Agency for Language Development and Cultivation. ISBN 979-685-267-5.
- Azri, Yaumil Chairani (2020). Algoritma Stemming Bahasa Melayu Belitung menggunakan Aturan Tata Bahasa (PDF) (Thesis) (in Indonesian). State Islamic University of Sultan Syarif Kasim Riau.
