= Bankə =

- Municipality
- Location within Azerbaijan
- Coordinates: 39°25′12″N 49°14′51″E
- Country: Azerbaijan
- Rayon: Neftchala

Population (2008)
  - Total: 7,574
- Time zone: UTC+4 (AZT)
  - Summer (DST): UTC+5 (AZT)

Bankə (also, Bank, Banka, Bankov, Imeni Kirova and Rybokombinat Imeni Kirova) is a village and the most populous municipality, except for the capital Neftçala, in the Neftchala Rayon of Azerbaijan. It has a population of 7,574.

== Etymology ==
The city's name comes from Azerbaijani version of fishing bank.
