= Chinese Maluku =

Moluccan Chinese
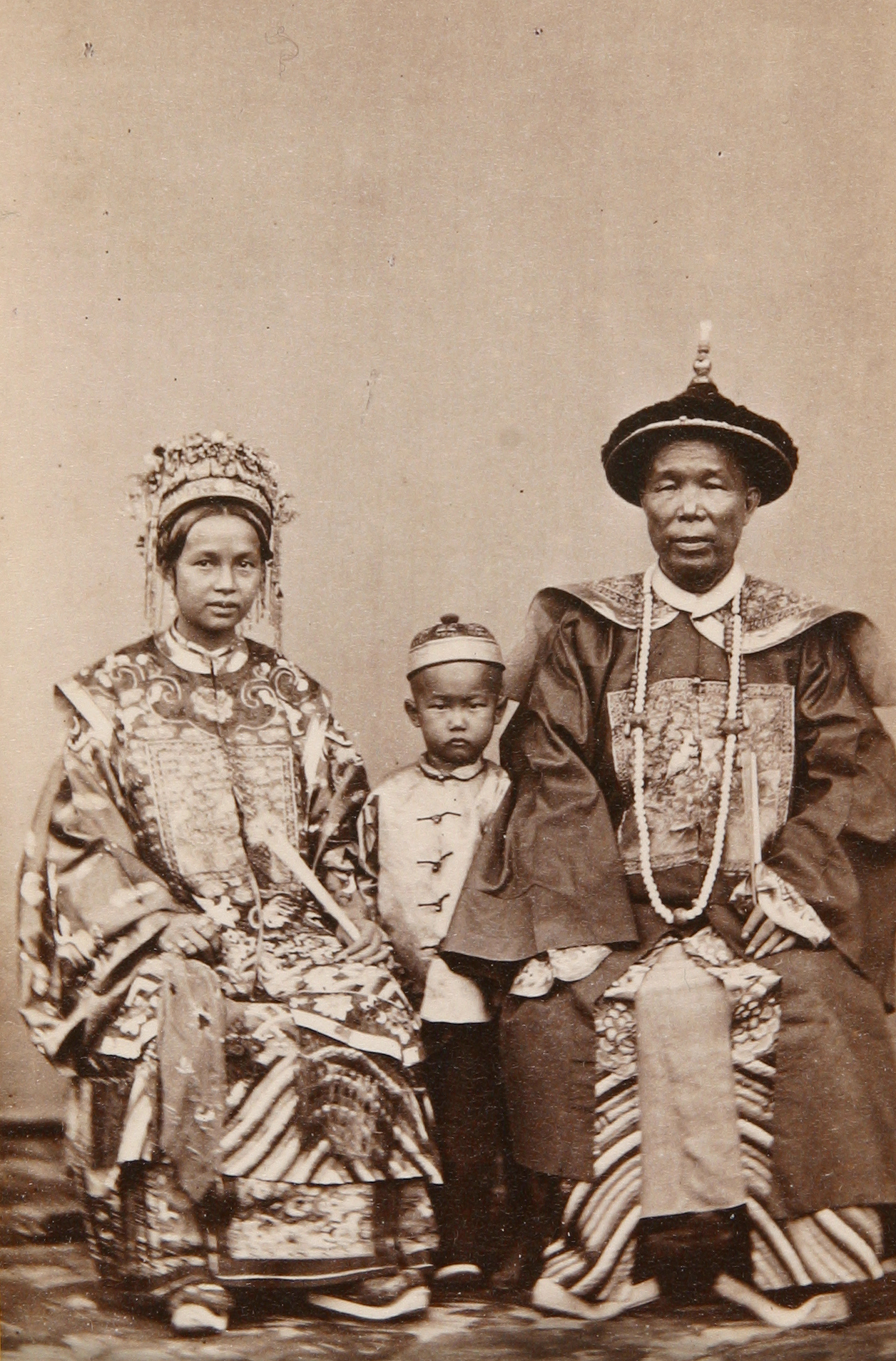
- A Chinese Family in Ternate (1870)

Regions with significant populations
- Ambon, Aru, Seram, Ternate, Tidore, Dobo, Saumlaki

Languages
- Indonesian, Ambonese, Hokkien, Hakka, Cantonese

Religion
- Christianity, Buddhism, Islam

The Moluccan Chinese are a community of Chinese Indonesians living in the Maluku Islands. Majority of Moluccan Chinese were Hokkien ancestry.

== History ==
Maluku Islands has been recorded in the tambo of the Tang dynasty in China (618–906) which mentions 'Miliku', namely an area used as a benchmark for determining the direction to the kingdom of Holing (Kalingga) in the west. WP Groenveldt estimates this 'Mi-li-ku' to be Maluku.

The history of the entry of ethnic Chinese into Indonesia in general cannot be ascertained well as with their arrival in the Maluku Islands, even if there are sources that prove the arrival of ethnic Chinese, mostly from stories from the local community and also from some evidence of inheritance from Chinese descendants who are still there and have even intermarried with native Maluku people.

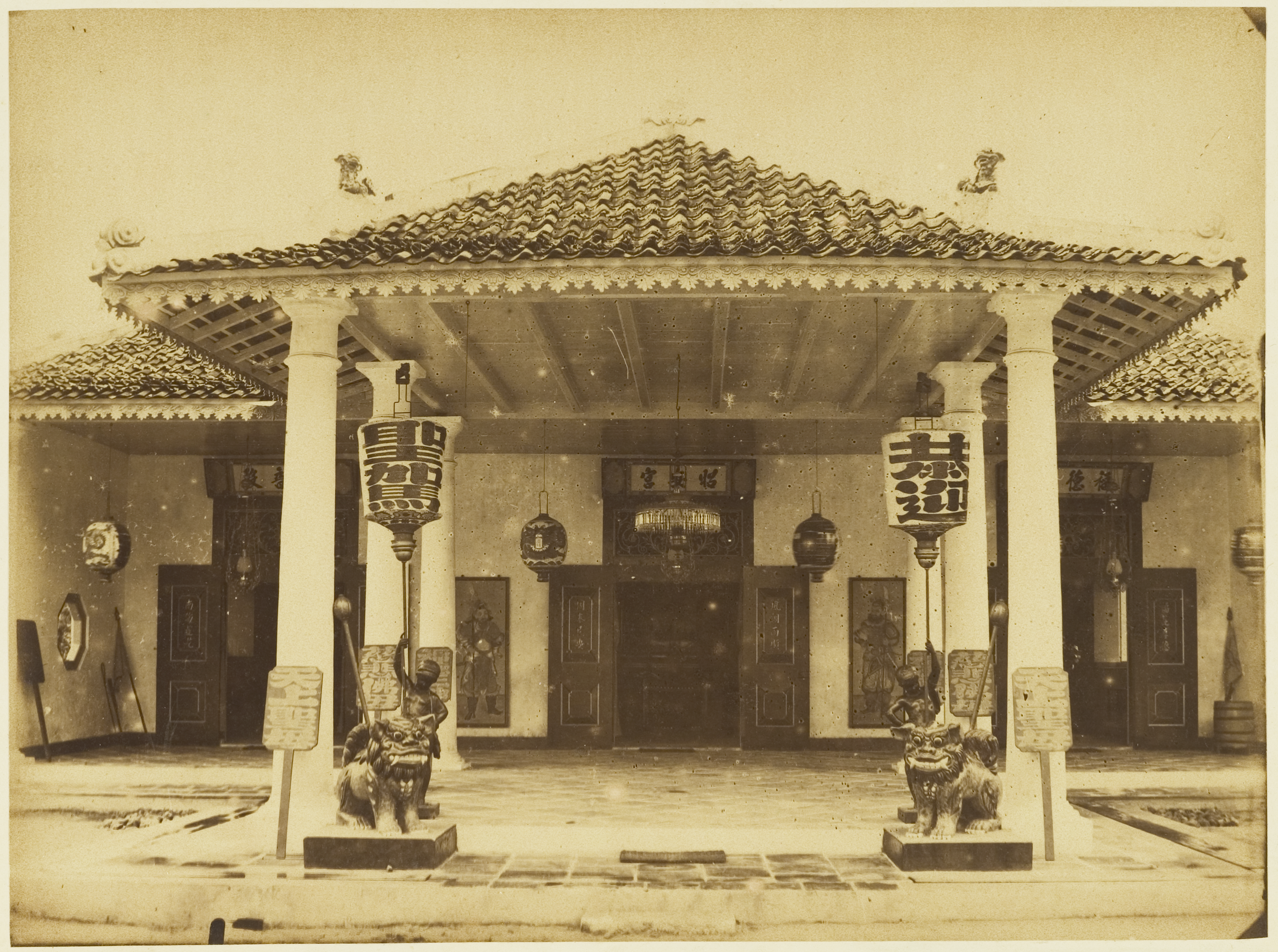
Chinese temple in Ambon, Maluku.

== Family name ==
Common surname among Moluccan Chinese:

- Cia/Tjia (Chinese: 謝, pinyin: xie)
- Gouw/Goh (Chinese: 吳, hanyu pinyin: wu)
- Kang/Kong (Chinese: 江, pinyin: jiang)
- Lauw/Lau (Chinese: 劉, pinyin: liu)
- Lee/Lie (Chinese: 李, pinyin: li)
- Oey/Ng/Oei (Chinese: 黃, hanyu pinyin: huang)
- Ong (Chinese: 王, pinyin Chinese: wang)
- Tan (Chinese: 陳, pinyin Chinese: chen)
- Tio/Thio/Theo/Teo (Chinese: 張, pinyin:zhang)
- Lim (Chinese: 林, pinyin: lin)

A common phenomena in Indonesia is because the surname is pronounced in the Hokkien dialect, there is no one exact standard of writing (romanization). This also causes many clans to have the same pronunciation in the Hokkien dialect, sometimes the same surname is actually not the case.

- Tio besides referring to the surname Zhang (張) in Mandarin, is also a Hokkien dialect of the clan Zhao (趙)
- Besides referring to the Hong (洪) surname in Mandarin, Ang is also a Hokkien dialect of the Weng (翁) clan

=== As Moluccan assimilated name ===
The Chinese name is assimilated as common Maluku surnames

- Tan and Oei referring to the Afaratu, surname in Saumlaki, Maluku
- Tan referring to the Tanlain, surname in Maluku
- Gan referring to the Ganwarin, surname in Maluku
- Go referring to the Gosal, surname in Maluku
- Go referring to the Gosan, surname in Maluku
- Oa referring to the Hamenda, surname in Maluku
- Lie referring to the Lerebulan, surname in Maluku
- Tjoa referring to the Tjoanda
- Whong referring to the Siswandy
- Liem referring to the Limubun

== Notable people ==
- Albertina Ho, former judge of the Supreme Court of Indonesia
- Gian Luigi, Indonesian comedian, writer, and producer
- Jonas Rivanno, Indonesian actor and model
- Matheos Tan, Indonesian bureaucrat, current Regent of Lembata (2023–)
- Rudi Taran, former high-ranking officer and retired fighter pilot of the Indonesian Air Force
- Sherly Tjoanda, current Governor of North Maluku
- Joseph Afaratu, Indonesian politician
- Mendy Chandra, Indonesian influencer

== Culture ==
=== Imlek ===
Imlek Gathering of Tionghoa Tanimbar in Tanimbar, Maluku (2026)

== Bibliography ==
- Johan Pattiasina (2020). "Etnis Tionghoa Dalam Dinamika Masyarakat Kepulauan Kei". Jurnal Lani:Kajian Ilmu Sejarah & Budaya. 1 (1 Hal 1-10). Universitas Pattimura - Program Studi Pendidikan Sejarah. ISSN 2746-8054.
