= 2018 Liga 3 Bangka Belitung Islands =

Liga 3 Bangka Belitung
- Season: 2018
- Champions: PS Basel

The 2018 Liga 3 Bangka Belitung is a qualifying round for the national round of 2018 Liga 3. PS Bangka Selection, the winner of the 2017 Liga 3 Bangka Belitung are the defending champions. The competition will begin on July 17, 2018.

== Group stage ==
The 6 probable teams to compete are mentioned below. This stage scheduled starts on July 16, 2018.

=== Group A ===
Pos	Team	Pld	W	D	L	GF	GA	GD	Pts	Qualification
1	PS Basel (A)	2	2	0	0	2	0	+2	6	Advance to next round
2	PS Belitung Timur	2	1	0	1	1	1	0	3	
3	PS Bangka Tengah	2	0	0	2	0	2	−2	0	

Updated to match(es) played on 20 July 2018. Source:
(A) Advance to a further round

=== Group B ===
Pos	Team	Pld	W	D	L	GF	GA	GD	Pts	Qualification
1	Persipas Pangkal Pinang (A)	2	2	0	0	7	4	+3	6	Advance to next round
2	PS Muntok	2	1	0	1	2	3	−1	3	
3	PS Bangka Selection	2	0	0	2	3	5	−2	0	

Updated to match(es) played on 31 July 2018. Source:
(A) Advance to a further round

== Final ==
3 August 2018

PS Basel	3-2	Persipas Pangkal Pinang
	Report

Orom Sungailiat Stadium, Bangka
