= 2017 Liga 3 Bangka Belitung Islands =

Liga 3 Bangka Belitung
- Season: 2017
- Champions: PS Bangka Selection

The 2017 Liga 3 Bangka Belitung season is the first edition of Liga 3 Bangka Belitung is a qualifying round of the 2017 Liga 3. PS Beltim are the defending champions.

== Teams ==
Liga 3 Bangka Belitung will be followed by six clubs namely PS Basel (South Bangka), PS Banteng (Central Bangka), Persibel Belitung, PS Beltim (East Belitung), PS Bangka Selection, and Belitong F.C.

== League table ==
Pos	Team	Pld	W	D	L		Pts
1	PS Bangka Selection	10	8	1	1	27-8	25
2	PS Beltim	10	6	3	1	23-13	21
3	PS Banteng	10	4	4	2	14-7	16
4	Persibel Belitung	10	4	1	5	18-15	13
5	PS Basel	10	1	3	6	7-19	6
6	Belitong FC	10	0	2	8	7-34	2

== Champions ==
Champions
PS Bangka Selection
1st title
