= 2023 Liga 3 Bangka Belitung Islands =

Tournament details
- Country: Indonesia
- Venue: 1
- Dates: 5 – 10 December 2023
- Teams: 3

Final positions
- Champions: PS Beltim (1st title)
- Qualified for: 2023–24 Liga 3 National phase

Tournament statistics
- Matches played: 5
- Goals scored: 9 (1.8 per match)
- All statistics correct as of 9 December 2023.

The 2023 Liga 3 Bangka Belitung Islands is the fourth edition of Liga 3 Bangka Belitung Islands organized by Asprov PSSI Bangka Belitung Islands.

This competition was attended by 3 clubs. The winner of this competition will advance to the national phase.

Belitong is the defending champion after winning it in the 2021 season.

== Teams ==
There are 3 teams participated in the league this season.

No.	Team	Location
1	PS Bangka Setara	Bangka Regency
2	PS Beltim	East Belitung Regency
3	Babel Jaya	Pangkalpinang City

== Venue ==
- Depati Amir Stadium, Pangkalpinang City

== League table ==
Pos	Team	Pld	W	D	L	GF	GA	GD	Pts	Qualification
1	PS Beltim (C)	4	2	2	0	7	2	+5	8	Winner and qualified to National Phase
2	PS Bangka Setara	4	2	1	1	6	2	+4	7	
3	Babel Jaya (H)	4	0	1	3	2	11	−9	1	

Updated to match(es) played on 9 December 2023. Source: Asprov PSSI Bangka Belitung Islands
(C) Champions; (H) Hosts

== Matches ==
Matchday 1

5 December 2023
15.00 WIB

PS Bangka Setara	0–0	PS Beltim
	Report

Depati Amir Stadium, Pangkalpinang City

Matchday 2

6 December 2023
15.00 WIB

PS Beltim	2–2	Babel Jaya
	Report

Depati Amir Stadium, Pangkalpinang City

Matchday 3

7 December 2023
15.00 WIB

Babel Jaya	0–3	PS Bangka Setara

Depati Amir Stadium, Pangkalpinang City

Matchday 4

8 December 2023
15.00 WIB

PS Beltim	2−0	PS Bangka Setara
	Report

Depati Amir Stadium, Pangkalpinang City

Matchday 5

9 December 2023
15.00 WIB

Babel Jaya	0−3 (w.o.)	PS Beltim
	Report

Depati Amir Stadium, Pangkalpinang City

PS Beltim were awarded a 3–0 win over Babel Jaya.

Matchday 6

10 December 2023
15.00 WIB

Babel Jaya	0−3 (w.o.)	PS Bangka Setara
	Report

Depati Amir Stadium, Pangkalpinang City

PS Bangka Setara were awarded a 3–0 win over Babel Jaya.

== Qualification to the national phase ==
Team	Method of qualification	Date of qualification	Qualified to
PS Beltim	2023 Liga 3 Bangka Belitung Islands champions	9 December 2023	2023–24 Liga 3 National Phase

== See also ==
- 2023–24 Liga 3 National phase
- 2023–24 Liga 3 Lampung
- 2023 Liga 3 West Sumatra
- 2023 Liga 3 Riau
- 2023 Liga 3 Riau Islands
- 2023 Liga 3 South Sumatra
- 2023–24 Liga 3 Aceh
- 2023 Liga 3 Bengkulu
- 2023 Liga 3 Jambi
- 2023 Liga 3 North Sumatra
