= List of incumbent regional heads and deputy regional heads in Bangka Belitung Islands =

The following is an article about the list of Regional Heads and Deputy Regional Heads in 7 regencies/cities in Bangka Belitung Islands who are currently still serving.

== List ==
Regency/ City	Photo of the Regent/ Mayor	Regent/ Mayor	Photo of Deputy Regent/ Mayor	Deputy Regent/ Mayor	Taking Office	End of Office (Planned)	Ref.
Bangka; Regency List of Regents/Deputy Regents		Fery Insani		Syahbudin	5 November 2025	5 November 2030	
West Bangka; Regency List of Regents/Deputy Regents		Markus		Yus Derahman	2 June 2025	2 June 2030	
South Bangka; Regency List of Regents/Deputy Regents		Riza Herdavid		Debby Vita Dewi	20 February 2025	20 February 2030	
Central Bangka; Regency List of Regents/Deputy Regents		Algafry Rahman		Efrianda	20 February 2025	20 February 2030	
Belitung; Regency List of Regents/Deputy Regents		Djoni Alamsyah Hidayat		Syamsir	20 February 2025	20 February 2030	
East Belitung; Regency List of Regents/Deputy Regents		Kamarudin Muten		Khairil Anwar	20 February 2025	20 February 2030	
Pangkalpinang; City List of Mayors/Deputy mayors		Saparudin		Dessy Ayutrisna	15 October 2025	15 October 2030	

Notes

- "Commencement of office" is the inauguration date at the beginning or during the current term of office. For acting regents/mayors, it is the date of appointment or extension as acting regent/mayor.
- Based on the Constitutional Court decision Number 27/PUU-XXII/2024, the Governor and Deputy Governor, Regent and Deputy Regent, and Mayor and Deputy Mayor elected in 2020 shall serve until the inauguration of the Governor and Deputy Governor, Regent and Deputy Regent, and Mayor and Deputy Mayor elected in the 2024 national simultaneous elections as long as the term of office does not exceed 5 (five) years.

== See also ==
- Bangka Belitung Islands
