= Yulius Pamungkas =

Indonesian footballer (born 2000)

Personal information
- Full name: Yulius Pamungkas
- Date of birth: 6 July 2000 (age 26)
- Place of birth: Sukoharjo, Indonesia
- Height: 1.57 m (5 ft 2 in)
- Position: Full-back

Team information
- Current team: Persiku Kudus
- Number: 8

Senior career*
Years	Team	Apps	(Gls)
2020	PSGC Ciamis	0	(0)
2021–2023	Persis Solo	2	(0)
2021	→ Belitong (loan)	11	(3)
2023–2024	Bekasi City	11	(1)
2024	Persikas Subang	1	(0)
2026–	Persiku Kudus	0	(0)
- * Club domestic league appearances and goals as of 1 December 2024

Yulius Pamungkas (born 16 July 2000) is an Indonesian professional footballer who plays as a full-back for Championship club Persiku Kudus.

== Club career ==
=== Persis Solo ===
He was signed for Persis Solo to play in Liga 2 in the 2021 season. Yulius made his league debut on 31 July 2022 in a match against Persija Jakarta at the Patriot Candrabhaga Stadium, Bekasi.

==== Loan to Belitong FC ====
In 2021, Yulius signed with Liga 3 club Belitong, on loan from Persis Solo. He made 11 league appearances and scored 3 goals for Belitong FC in the 2021 Liga 3 (Indonesia).

== Career statistics ==
=== Club ===
As of 1 December 2024.

Club	Season	League			Cup		Continental		Other		Total	
Club	Season	Division	Apps	Goals	Apps	Goals	Apps	Goals	Apps	Goals	Apps	Goals
Persis Solo	2021	Liga 2	0	0	0	0	0	0	0	0	0	0
Persis Solo	2022–23	Liga 1	2	0	0	0	0	0	2 (Note: Appearances in Indonesia President's Cup)	0	4	0
Belitong (loan)	2021–22	Liga 3	11	3	0	0	0	0	0	0	11	3
Bekasi City	2023–24	Liga 2	11	1	0	0	0	0	0	0	11	1
Persikas Subang	2024–25	Liga 2	1	0	0	0	0	0	0	0	1	0
Career total			25	4	0	0	0	0	2	0	27	4

== Honours ==
=== Club ===
Belitong

- Liga 3 Bangka Belitung: 2021
