= 2021 Liga 3 Bangka Belitung Islands =

2021 Liga 3 Bangka Belitung
- Dates: 5 November 2021 – 27 November 2021

Final positions
- Champions: Belitong (1st title)
- Runners-up: PS Bangka Setara
- Third place: PS Beltim
- Fourth place: SWN Belinyu

Tournament statistics
- Matches played: 43
- Goals scored: 102 (2.37 per match)

The 2021 Liga 3 Bangka Belitung is a qualifying round for the national round of 2021–22 Liga 3, The lowest tier in Indonesian football league system.

Persibabar West Bangka, the winner of the 2019 Liga 3 Bangka Belitung are the defending champions.

== Teams ==
There are 13 teams participated in the league this season, divided into 2 groups.

| Team | Location |
|---|---|
| Belitong | Belitung |
| Persibabar West Bangka | West Bangka |
| Persibel Belitung | Belitung |
| Persipas Pangkal Pinang | Pangkal Pinang |
| PS Bangka | Bangka Regency |
| PS Bangka Setara | Bangka Regency |
| PS Basel | South Bangka |
| PS Bateng | Central Bangka |
| PS Beltim | East Belitung |
| Putra Laut | Bangka Regency |
| SWN Belinyu | Bangka Regency |
| Babel Jaya | Pangkal Pinang |
| KOP SS Belitung | Belitung |

== Group stage ==
=== Group A ===
- All matches are played in Orom Stadium, Sungailiat, Bangka Belitung.

| Pos | Team | Pld | W | D | L | GF | GA | GD | Pts | Qualification |
|---|---|---|---|---|---|---|---|---|---|---|
| 1 | PS Bangka Setara (H) | 6 | 3 | 3 | 0 | 9 | 2 | +7 | 12 (Note: Head-to-head result: PS Bangka Setara 0–0 SWN.) | Knockout stage |
| 2 | SWN Belinyu | 6 | 3 | 3 | 0 | 6 | 2 | +4 | 12 | Knockout stage |
| 3 | Persibabar West Bangka | 6 | 3 | 2 | 1 | 9 | 5 | +4 | 11 | Knockout stage |
| 4 | PS Bateng | 6 | 2 | 3 | 1 | 10 | 5 | +5 | 9 | Knockout stage |
| 5 | Persipas Pangkal Pinang | 6 | 2 | 0 | 4 | 6 | 11 | −5 | 6 (Note: Head-to-head result: Persipas 3–2 PS Bangka.) | |
| 6 | PS Bangka | 6 | 1 | 3 | 2 | 6 | 6 | 0 | 6 | |
| 7 | Putra Laut | 6 | 0 | 0 | 6 | 4 | 19 | −15 | 0 | |

Source: 2021 Liga 3 Bangka Belitung
Rules for classification: 1) Points; 2) Head-to-head; 3) Goal difference; 4) Goal scored; 5) Drawing.
(H) Hosts

=== Group B ===
- All matches are played in Pangkallalang Stadium, Tanjung Pandan, Bangka Belitung.

| Pos | Team | Pld | W | D | L | GF | GA | GD | Pts | Qualification |
|---|---|---|---|---|---|---|---|---|---|---|
| 1 | Belitong (H) | 5 | 4 | 1 | 0 | 12 | 1 | +11 | 13 | Knockout stage |
| 2 | PS Beltim | 5 | 3 | 2 | 0 | 7 | 3 | +4 | 11 | Knockout stage |
| 3 | Babel Jaya | 5 | 3 | 1 | 1 | 10 | 2 | +8 | 10 | Knockout stage |
| 4 | KOP SS Belitung | 5 | 2 | 0 | 3 | 4 | 11 | −7 | 6 | Knockout stage |
| 5 | PS Basel | 5 | 1 | 0 | 4 | 2 | 8 | −6 | 3 | |
| 6 | Persibel Belitung | 5 | 0 | 0 | 5 | 0 | 10 | −10 | 0 | |

Source: 2021 Liga 3 Bangka Belitung
Rules for classification: 1) Points; 2) Head-to-head; 3) Goal difference; 4) Goal scored; 5) Drawing.
(H) Hosts

== Knockout stage ==
All times were local, WIB (UTC+7).

=== Bracket ===
Quarter finals
PS Bangka Setara | 2
KOP SS | 1
Persibabar | 2
PS Beltim | 5
Belitong | 3
PS Bateng | 1
SWN Belinyu | 1
Babel Jaya | 0

Semi finals
PS Bangka Setara | 1
PS Beltim | 0
Belitong | 0 (4)
SWN Belinyu | 0 (3)

Finals
PS Bangka Setara | 0
Belitong | 1
Third place
PS Beltim | 2
SWN Belinyu | 1

=== Quarter finals ===
20 November 2021
13:30

| PS Bangka Setara | 2–1 | KOP SS |
|---|---|---|
| Kevin Ivander 78'; Noval Akmal 86' | Report | Reza Yulian 46' |

Pangkallalang Stadium, Tanjung Pandan
20 November 2021
15:45

| Persibabar | 2–5 | PS Beltim |
|---|---|---|
| Franky 63' (pen.); Miranto 78' | Report | Bayu Panegrah 4', 18'; Boni Tusta 12'; Ade Candra 51' (pen.) 58' |

Pangkallalang Stadium, Tanjung Pandan
21 November 2021
13:30

| Belitong | 3–1 | PS Bateng |
|---|---|---|
| Riza Alfin Zidane 3'; Yulius Pamungkas 50'; Fahreza Sudin 75' | Report | Faisal 2' |

Pangkallalang Stadium, Tanjung Pandan
21 November 2021
15:45

| SWN Belinyu | 1–0 | Babel Jaya |
|---|---|---|
| M.Angga Pratama 24' | Report |

Pangkallalang Stadium, Tanjung Pandan

=== Semi finals ===
24 November 2021
13:30

| PS Bangka Setara | 1–0 | PS Beltim |
|---|---|---|
| Muhammad Kurniawan 82' | Report |

Pangkallalang Stadium, Tanjung Pandan
24 November 2021
15:45

| Belitong | 0–0 | SWN Belinyu |
|---|---|---|
| | Report |
Penalties
| Penalty scored Penalty missed | 4–3 | Penalty missed Penalty scored |

Pangkallalang Stadium, Tanjung Pandan

=== Third place ===
26 November 2021
15:00

| SWN Belinyu | 1–2 | PS Beltim |
|---|---|---|
| M.Angga Pratama 81' | Report | Ade Candra 24'; Bayu Panegrah 67' |

Pangkallalang Stadium, Tanjung Pandan

=== Final ===
27 November 2021
15:30

| PS Bangka Setara | 0–1 | Belitong |
|---|---|---|
| | Report | Yulius Pamungkas 59' |

Pangkallalang Stadium, Tanjung Pandan
