= 2014 Liga Nusantara Bangka Belitung =

Liga Nusantara Bangka Belitung
- Season: 2014
- Champions: Persipas Pangkalpinang

The 2014 Liga Nusantara Bangka Belitung season was the first edition of Liga Nusantara Bangka Belitung as a qualifying round of the 2014 Liga Nusantara.

== Teams ==
The Liga Nusantara Bangka Belitung consisted of six clubs namely Persipas Pangkalpinang, PS Bangka Tengah, Persibel Belitung, PS Beltim, PS Bangka Selection, and Belitong.

== Result ==
Persipas Pangkalpinang is the winner.
