= Fahreza Sudin =

Indonesian footballer

Personal information
- Full name: Fahreza Sudin Hi Ibrahim
- Date of birth: 12 August 2000 (age 26)
- Place of birth: Ternate, Indonesia
- Height: 1.68 m (5 ft 6 in)
- Position: Midfielder

Team information
- Current team: Java United
- Number: 88

Youth career
- 2017: Persiter Ternate
- 2018: Villa 2000
- 2018: Binter Football Academy
- 2019–2020: Bhayangkara
- 2021: PON Maluku Utara

Senior career*
Years	Team	Apps	(Gls)
2021	Belitong	14	(7)
2022–2025	Persita Tangerang	85	(3)
2025–2026	PSIM Yogyakarta	23	(2)
2026–	Java United	1	(0)
- * Club domestic league appearances and goals as of 13 September 2026

Fahreza Sudin Hi Ibrahim (born 12 August 2000) is an Indonesian professional footballer who plays as a midfielder for Super League club Java United.

== Club career ==
=== Belitong FC ===
On 2021, Fahreza signed a one-year contract with Liga 3 club Belitong. He made 14 league appearances and scored 7 goals for Belitong FC in the 2021 Liga 3 (Indonesia).

=== Persita Tangerang ===
He was signed for Persita Tangerang to play in Liga 1 in the 2022 season. Fahreza made his league debut on 25 July 2022 in a match against Persik Kediri at the Indomilk Arena, Tangerang. On 5 December, Fahreza scored his first league goal in the 2022–23 Liga 1 for Persita in a 2–3 loss over Bali United at the Manahan Stadium. On 6 June 2025, Fahreza officially left Persita Tangerang.

== Career statistics ==
=== Club ===
As of 13 September 2026

Club	Season	League			Cup		Other		Total	
Club	Season	Division	Apps	Goals	Apps	Goals	Apps	Goals	Apps	Goals
Belitong	2021–22	Liga 3	14	7	0	0	0	0	14	7
Persita Tangerang	2022–23	Liga 1	31	1	0	0	3 (Note: Appearances in Indonesia President's Cup)	0	34	1
Persita Tangerang	2023–24	Liga 1	31	2	0	0	0	0	31	2
Persita Tangerang	2024–25	Liga 1	23	0	0	0	0	0	23	0
PSIM Yogyakarta	2025–26	Super League	23	2	0	0	0	0	23	2
Java United	2026–27	Super League	1	0	0	0	0	0	1	0
Career total			123	12	0	0	3	0	126	12

== Honours ==
=== Club ===
Belitong

- Liga 3 Bangka Belitung: 2021
