= Justiar Noer =

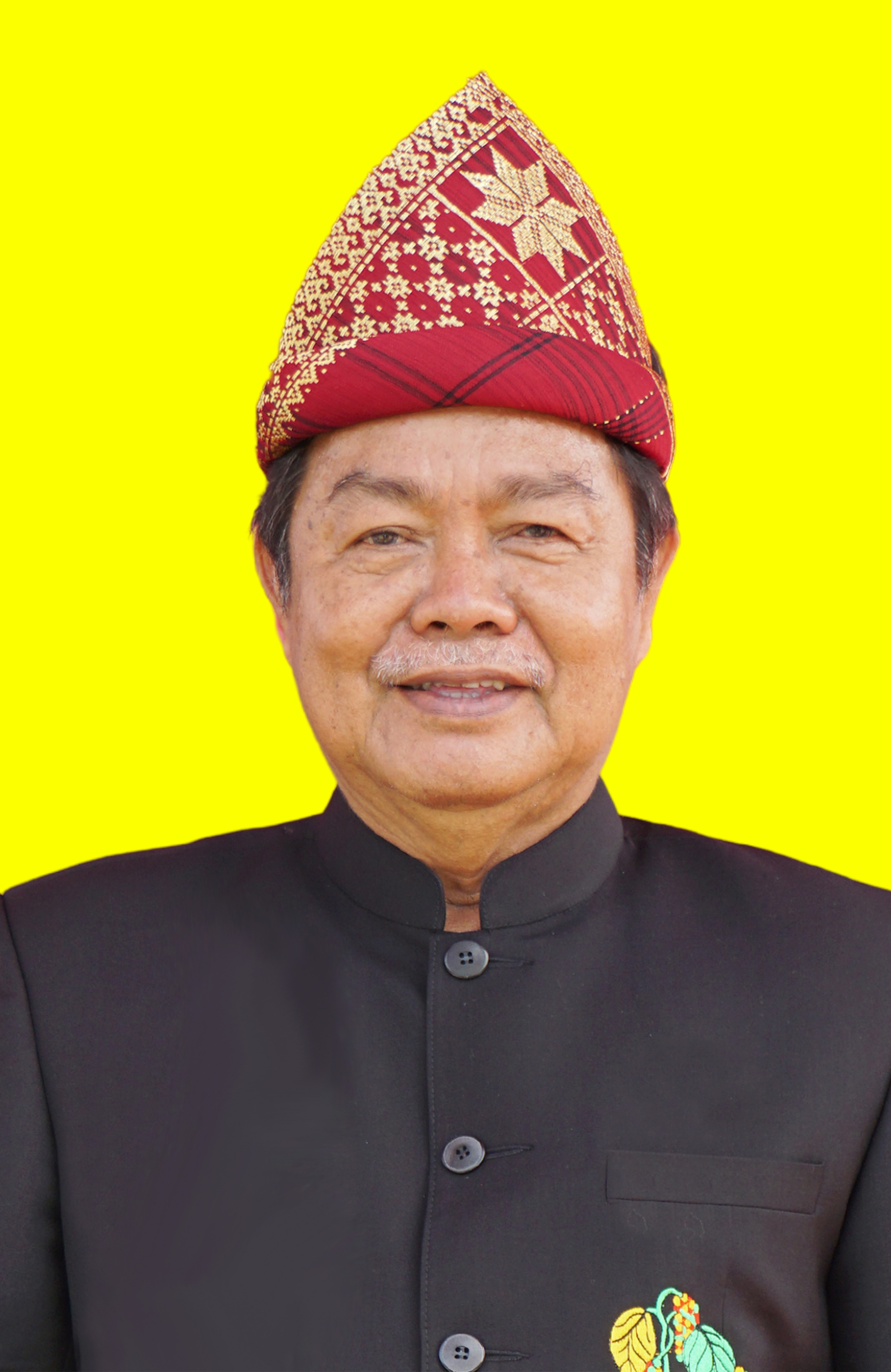
- Noer in 2023

Regent of South Bangka
- In office 17 February 2016 – 17 February 2021
- Preceded by: Jamro H. Jalil
- Succeeded by: Riza Herdavid
- In office 2004–2010
- Preceded by: Zikri Kisai (act.)
- Succeeded by: Jamro H. Jalil

Personal details
- Born: 23 December 1950 (age 75) Toboali, South Sumatra, Indonesia

Justiar Noer (born 23 December 1950) is an Indonesian politician. He was the regent of South Bangka Regency between 2004–2010 and 2016–2021.

== Early life ==
Justiar Noer was born in the town of Toboali on 23 December 1950 to M. Noer and Ratnasari. After completing middle school there in 1966, he would move to Pangkalpinang for high school where he graduated in 1970. He then studied architecture in Bandung, receiving a diploma in 1976. He would later received bachelor's degrees in architecture and civil engineering, along with a master's in management.

== Career ==
Noer had begun to work as an architect since 1973 during his study in Bandung. In 1981, he was appointed as resident engineer for a development project in Bengkulu, and he would join Bengkulu's civil service as part of its public works department. By 1998, he had become head of the department's public housing unit before he was reassigned to South Sumatra in 2000, and then to the Bangka Regency municipal government in 2001. In 2004, Noer was appointed acting regent of South Bangka Regency.

When South Bangka held its first regency election in 2005, Noer took part and was elected regent with Jamro H. Jalil as vice regent. Noer ran for a second term in 2010, securing the support of 14 parties, but he was defeated by his former deputy Jamro who was supported by PDI-P and PKS. In the 2014 Indonesian legislative election, Noer would run for a seat in the House of Representatives as a United Development Party member, but was not elected.

In 2015, Noer ran again in South Bangka's regency election with Riza Herdavid as running mate, the pair winning 31,538 votes (38.6%) in a three-way race and defeating Jamro. Noer and Herdavid were sworn in on 17 February 2016. In 2016, Noer initiated the "Toboali City on Fire" festival to promote tourism in South Bangka. His second term expired in 2021 and he was succeeded by Herdavid.

He ran for a seat in the Regional Representative Council representing Bangka Belitung in 2024, but was not elected.

== Family ==
He is married to Ekawati Widjanarko. One of their children, Aditya Rizki Pradana, was elected into the Bangka Belitung Islands Regional House of Representatives in 2019.
