= Rebo Kasan =

Rebo Kasan is a traditional ceremony held as a ritual to reject reinforcements which is held every Syafar month based on the Hijriah calendar every last Wednesday by people in Bangka Regency, to be precise in the area of Air Anyir Village, Merawang District. In particular, this tradition is carried out in the Dusun Temberan and Dusun Mudal which are hamlets located on the beach.

== Etymology ==
The origin of the word 'Rebo Kasan' comes from the word Rabu Kasat which means the last. The ceremony was held aimed at asking for help from God Almighty in order to avoid various disasters. On the day of the ceremony, people gather to read prayers together.
