= Orom Stadium =

Football stadium in Sungailiat, Indonesia

- Location in Bangka Belitung Islands
- Address: Jl. Jend. Sudirman no.3, Sri Menanti, Sungailiat, Bangka Regency, Bangka Belitung Islands 33215
- Location: Sungailiat, Bangka Regency, Bangka Belitung Islands
- Coordinates: 1.868893°S 106.117682°E
- Owner: Government of Bangka Regency
- Operator: Government of Bangka Regency
- Capacity: 7,000
- Surface: Grass field

Tenants
- PS Bangka; PS Bangka Setara

Orom Stadium or Ir. Sutiyono Stadium is a football stadium in the town of Sungailiat, Bangka Regency, Bangka Belitung Islands, Indonesia. The stadium has a capacity of 7,000 people.

It is the home base of PS Bangka .
