= PS Bangka Setara =

Indonesian football club

- Full name: Persatuan Sepakbola Bangka Setara
- Nickname: Laskar Depati Bahrin (Depati Bahrin Warriors)
- Founded: November 4, 2021; 4 years ago
- Ground: Orom Stadium; Bangka, Bangka Belitung Islands
- Capacity: 7,000
- Owner: Askab PSSI Bangka
- Chairman: Deni Martadiyansah
- Manager: Yogi Yamani
- Coach: Teguh Yulianto
- League: Liga 4
- 2023: 2rd, (Bangka Belitung Islands zone)
Home colours	Away colours

Persatuan Sepakbola Bangka Setara (simply known as PS Bangka Setara) is an Indonesian football club based in Sungailiat, Bangka, Bangka Belitung Islands. They currently compete in the Liga 4.

== History ==
PS Bangka Setara was established in 2021, PS Bangka Setara was officially launched by the Regent of Bangka, Mulkan.

PS Bangka Setara made club debut into Indonesian football by joining the third-tier league Indonesia Liga 3 in 2021. PS Bangka Setara made their first league match debut on 5 November 2021 in a 4–0 win against Putra Laut at the Orom Stadium.

== Honours ==
- Liga 3 Bangka Belitung Islands
  - Runners-up (2): 2021, 2023
