= Riza Herdavid =

Indonesian politician

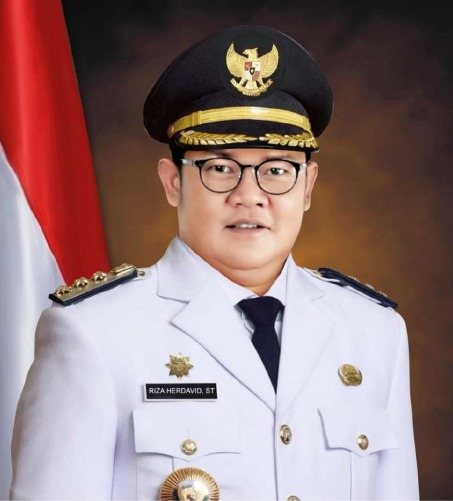
- Official portrait

Regent of South Bangka
- Incumbent
- Assumed office 26 February 2021
- Preceded by: Justiar Noer

Vice Regent of South Bangka
- In office 17 February 2016 – 17 February 2021
- Regent: Justiar Noer
- Preceded by: Nursyamsu H. Alias
- Succeeded by: Debby Vita Dewi

Personal details
- Born: 10 September 1983 (age 42) Sungai Selan, Bangka Belitung, Indonesia
- Party: PDI-P

Riza Herdavid (born 10 September 1983) is an Indonesian politician who has served as the regent of South Bangka Regency since 2021. He was previously the regency's vice regent between 2016 and 2021.

== Early life ==
Riza Herdavid was born on 10 September 1983 in Lampur village, today in Sungai Selan district of Central Bangka Regency as the youngest of five children. His father was a retired employee of the state-owned tin mining company PT Timah, while his mother worked as a baker after his father's retirement. Riza studied in Sungailiat, completing high school there in 2001. Between 2004 and 2008, he studied for a bachelor's degree in chemical engineering at the Muhammadiyah University Jakarta. He married Elizia after his graduation, and the couple has two children.

== Career ==
Riza began to work at Telkom Indonesia in 2006, working until 2009.

In the 2014 Indonesian legislative election, Riza unsuccessfully ran for a seat in the South Bangka Regional House of Representatives (DPRD) as a member of the NasDem Party. The following year, he ran as the running mate to Justiar Noer in the regency election, and was elected after winning 31,538 votes (38.6%), defeating incumbent regent Jamro in the three-way election with the support of Demokrat and PKS. His tenure as vice regent lasted from 17 February 2016 to 17 February 2021. In this period, he had moved to Golkar, then Demokrat, then in 2020 became a member of the Indonesian Democratic Party of Struggle.

In the 2020 regency election, Riza ran as the regent candidate and was elected with 40,345 votes (41.5%) with Debby Vita Dewi as running mate. Riza was sworn in as regent on 26 February 2021. He was reelected in a single-candidate election in 2024.

As regent, Riza appropriated Rp 30 billion (~USD 2 million) from the regency's budget for a healthcare program supplementary to the national BPJS Kesehatan. The regency government under Riza also distributed oil palm saplings to farmers and free school uniforms and equipment .
