= Bangka Island =

Island in Indonesia

Bangka بڠک (Jawi) 邦加島 (Chinese)
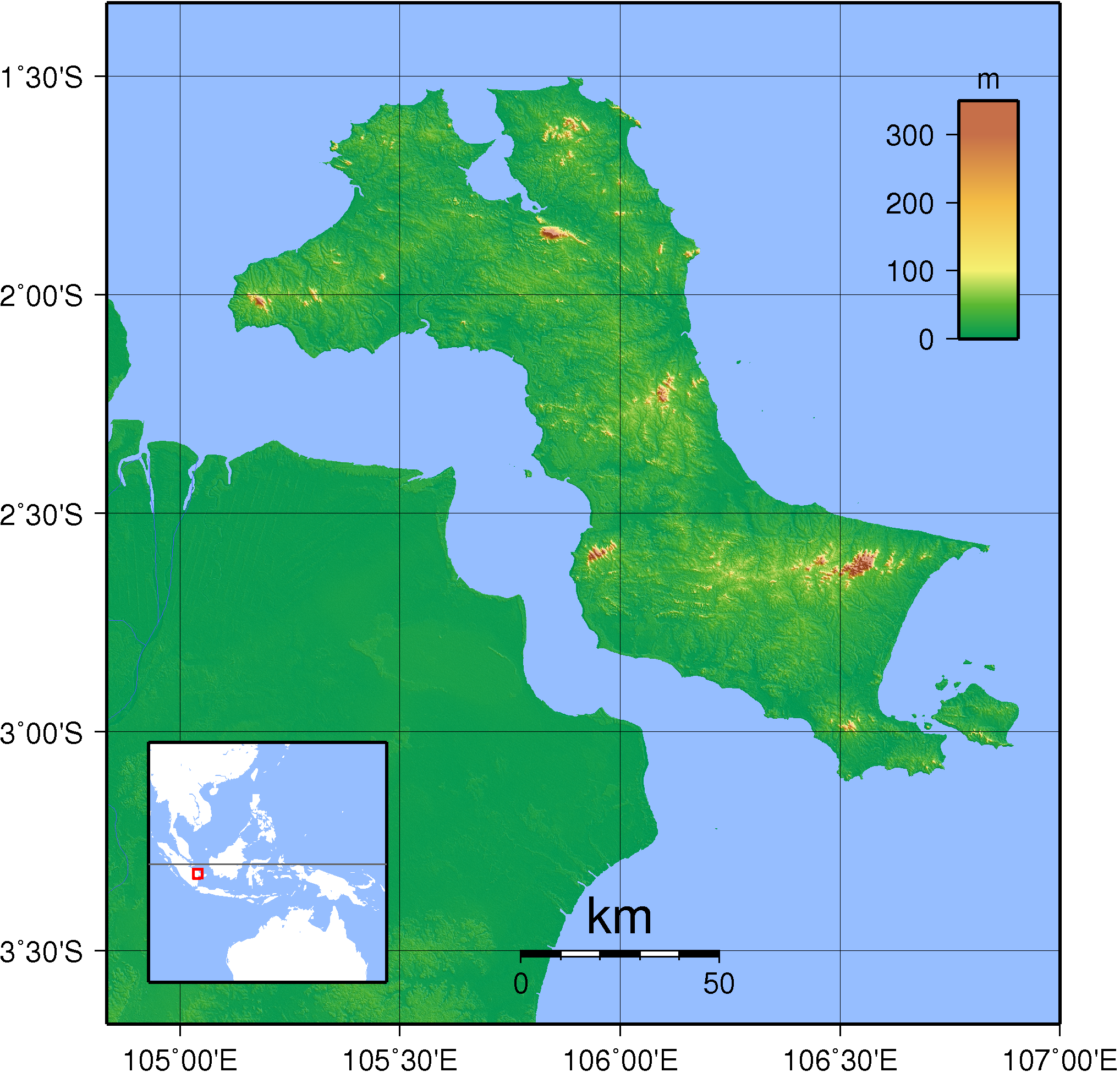
- Topography of Bangka island
- Interactive map of Bangka بڠک (Jawi) 邦加島 (Chinese)

Geography
- Location: Southeast Asia
- Coordinates: 2°15′S 106°00′E
- Area: 11,831.02 km^{2} (4,567.98 sq mi)
- Area rank: 68th
- Highest elevation: 665 m (2182 ft)
- Highest point: Gunung Bui

Administration
- Indonesia
- Provinces: Pangkal Pinang, Bangka Regency, Central Bangka, South Bangka, West Bangka
- Largest settlement: Pangkal Pinang (pop. 227,300)

Demographics
- Demonym: Bangka islanders
- Population: 1,191,300 (mid-2023 estimate)
- Pop. density: 100.7/km^{2} (260.8/sq mi)
- Ethnic groups: Bangka Malays and Chinese (mostly Hakkas)

Bangka is an island lying east of Sumatra, Indonesia. It is administered under the province of the Bangka Belitung Islands, being one of its namesakes alongside the smaller island of Belitung across the Gaspar Strait. The 9th largest island in Indonesia, it had a population of 1,146,581 at the 2020 census; the official estimate as at mid 2023 was 1,191,300. It is the location of the provincial capital of Pangkal Pinang, and is administratively divided into four regencies and a city. The island itself and the surrounding sea suffers considerable environmental damage from its thriving tin mining industry which operates on- and offshore.

== Geography ==
Bangka is the largest landmass of the province of the Bangka Belitung Islands. It lies just east of Sumatra, separated by the Bangka Strait; to the north lies the South China Sea, to the east, across the Gaspar Strait, is the island of Belitung, and to the south is the Java Sea. It is about 11,831 km^{2} in area (including offshore islands). Most of its geography consists of lower plains, swamps, small hills, and beaches (including Pasir Padi). It has white pepper fields, many palm trees, rubber trees, and tin mines.

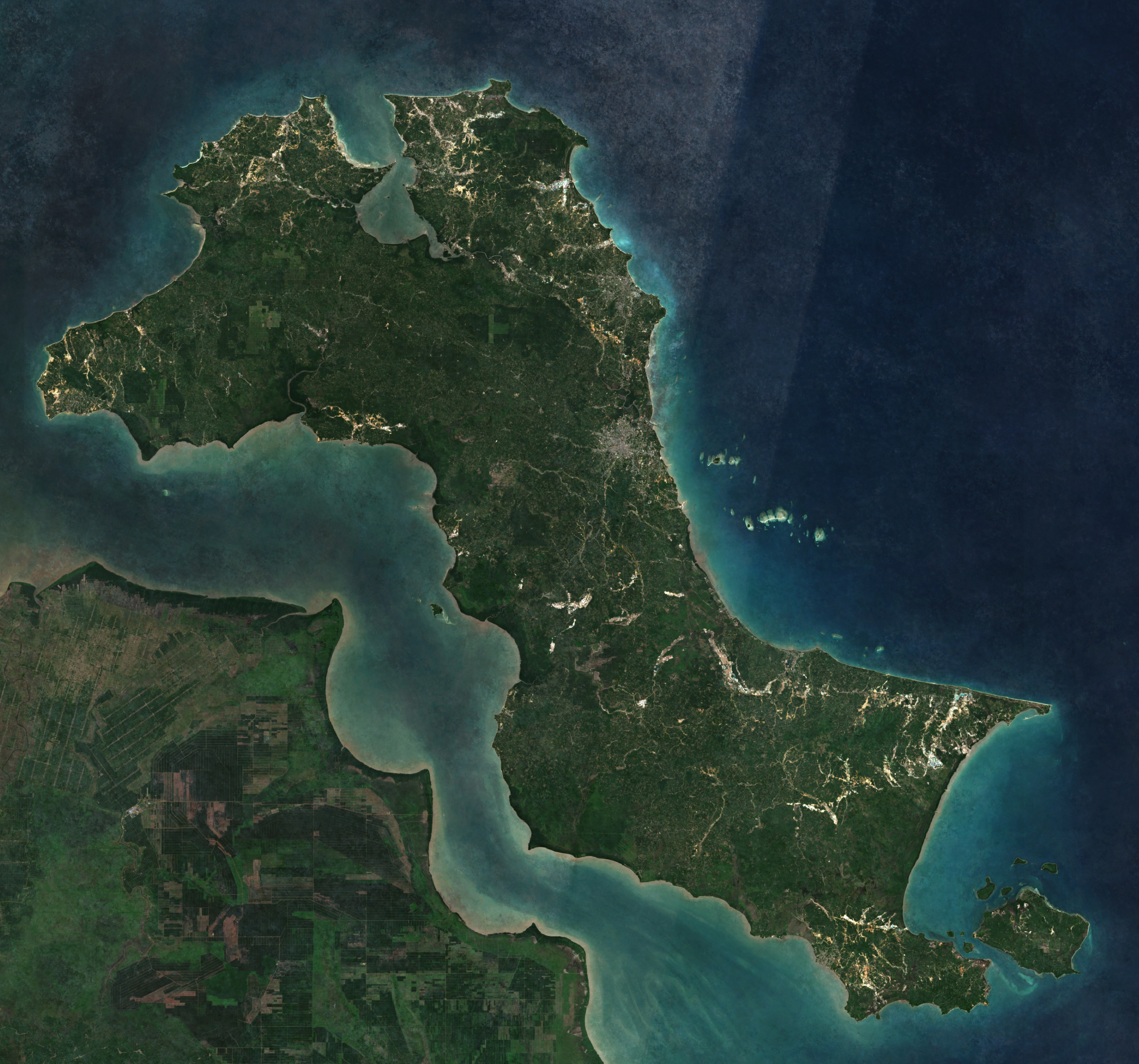
A satellite image of Bangka Island, 2022.

The island's largest city, Pangkal Pinang, is also the capital and largest city of the province. The town of Sungailiat is its second-largest settlement. Mentok (formerly Muntok) is the principal port in the west. Other important towns are Toboali in the southern region; Koba, an important tin-mining town, also in the southern part of the island; and Belinyu, which is famous for its seafood products. Bangka has four seaports: Mentok, in the far west; Belinyu, in the far north; Sadai, in the far south; and Pangkal Balam, in Pangkal Pinang, where the government is contemplating the construction of a nuclear power station.

The population was 626,955 in 1990, 960,692 at the 2010 census and 1,146,581 at the 2020 census; the official estimate as at mid 2023 was 1,191,300. The area is 11,831 square kilometres (4,568 square miles) (including smaller offshore islands).

== History ==
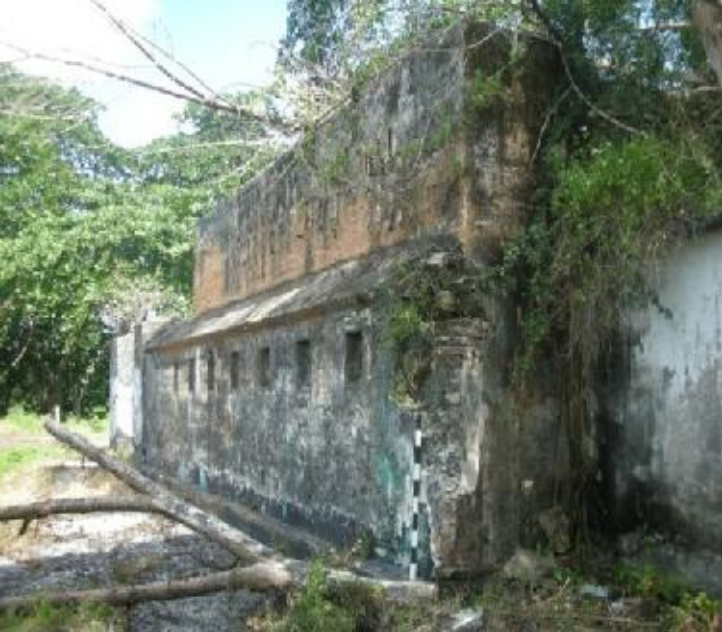
Ruins of the Dutch Fort in Toboali, built in 1825

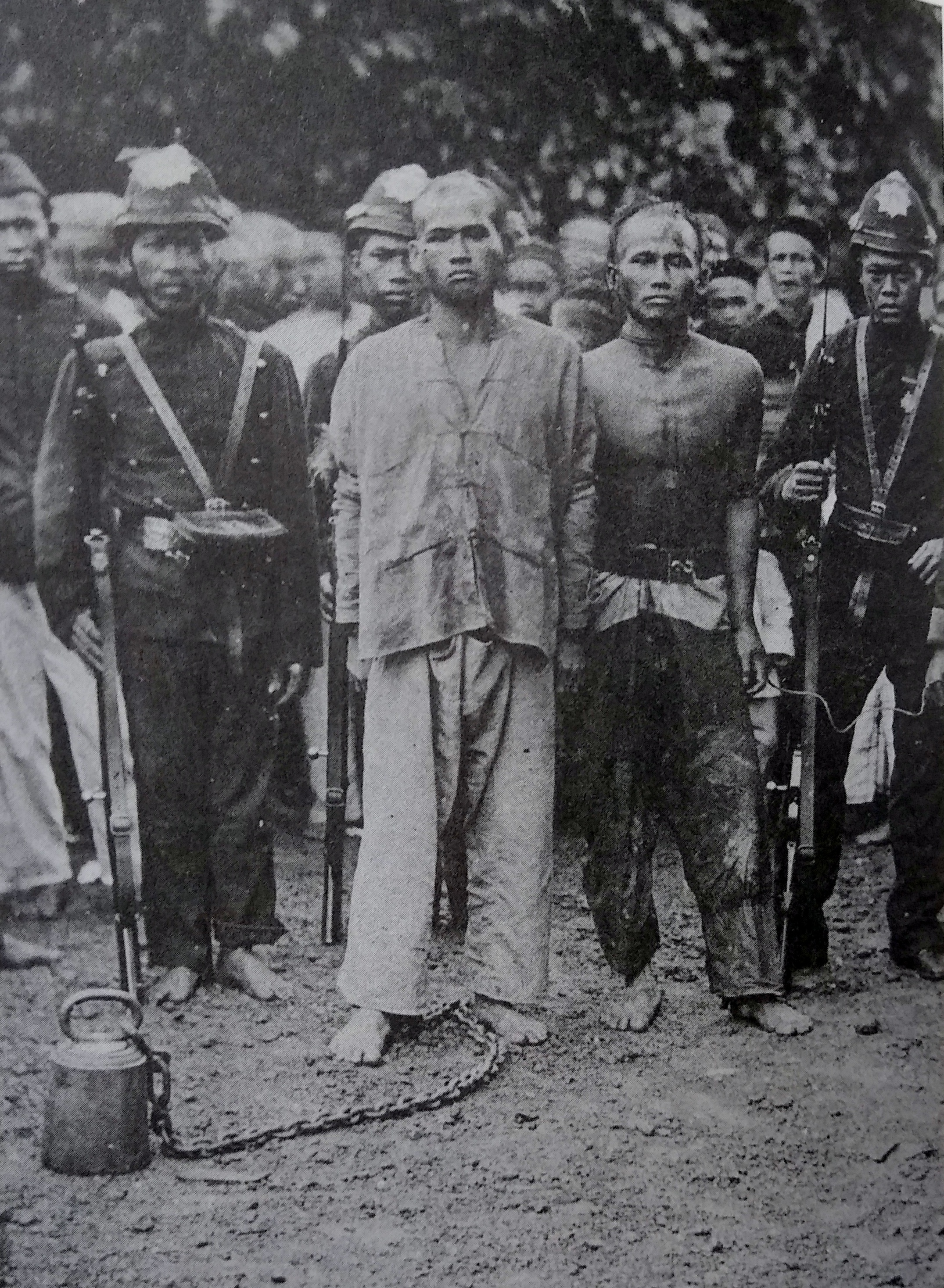
Coolie rebellion on Bangka; Chinese leaders captured by the Royal Netherlands East Indies Army, 1899

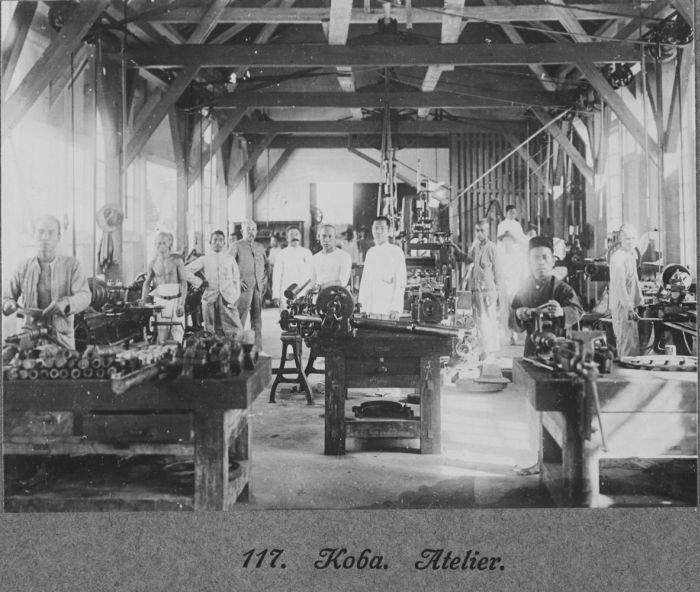
Tin workers on Bangka, 1914

During the glacial periods, Bangka was connected to mainland Asia similarly with the larger islands of Java, Sumatra, and Borneo as part of the Sunda Shelf, and got separated once the sea level rose.

The Kota Kapur inscription, dated from 686 CE, was found in Bangka in 1920, showed Srivijayan influence on the island around the 7th century. Later, the island was conquered by an expedition from Majapahit, led by Gajah Mada, which appointed local rulers and established social structures. As the empire declined, Bangka fell into neglect.

Bangka was recorded as Peng-ka hill (彭加山) in the 1436 Xingcha Shenglan, compiled by the Chinese soldier Fei Xin during the treasure voyages of Admiral Zheng He. Contemporary records show that the area – close to the busy Strait of Malacca and waters of the Musi River – had significant presence of Chinese traders.

Later on, the island was taken over by the Johor and Minangkabau Sultanates which introduced Islam to the island. It continued to pass to the Banten Sultanate before it was then inherited by the nearby Palembang Sultanate sometime in the late 17th century. Soon after, around 1710, tin was discovered on the island which attracted migrants from across the archipelago and beyond. Descendants of the Chinese immigrants, mainly from Guangdong, still form a large portion of modern Bangka's inhabitants.

As tin mining developed further, the Palembang Sultanate sent for experts in Malay Peninsula and China. The Dutch East India Company managed to secure a monopolistic tin purchase agreement in 1722, but hostilities began to develop between the Sultan and the Dutch. During the British invasion of Java in 1811, then-Sultan Mahmud Badaruddin attacked and massacred the staff of the Dutch post on the island. He was later deposed by the British. His successor ceded Bangka to Britain in 1812. The British renamed this island to Duke of York Island, but in 1814 Britain exchanged it with the Dutch for Cochin in India following the Anglo-Dutch Treaty of 1814.

Around the late years of the 18th century, Bangka was an important production center of tin in Asia, with annual outputs hovering around 1,250 tons. In 1930 Bangka had a population of 205,363. Japan occupied the island from February 1942 to August 1945 during World War II. The Japanese military perpetrated the Bangka Island massacre against Australian nurses and British and Australian servicemen and civilians.

During the Indonesian National Revolution, republican leaders Sukarno and Hatta were exiled in Bangka in the aftermath of Operation Kraai. Bangka became part of independent Indonesia in 1949. The island, together with neighboring Belitung, was formerly part of South Sumatra province, but in 2000 the two islands became the new province of Bangka-Belitung. In the recent years, tin mining has declined notedly, although it is still a major part of the island's economy.

Bangka is also home to a number of communist Indonesians who have been under house arrest since the 1960s anti-Communist purge and are not permitted to leave the island.

== Economy ==
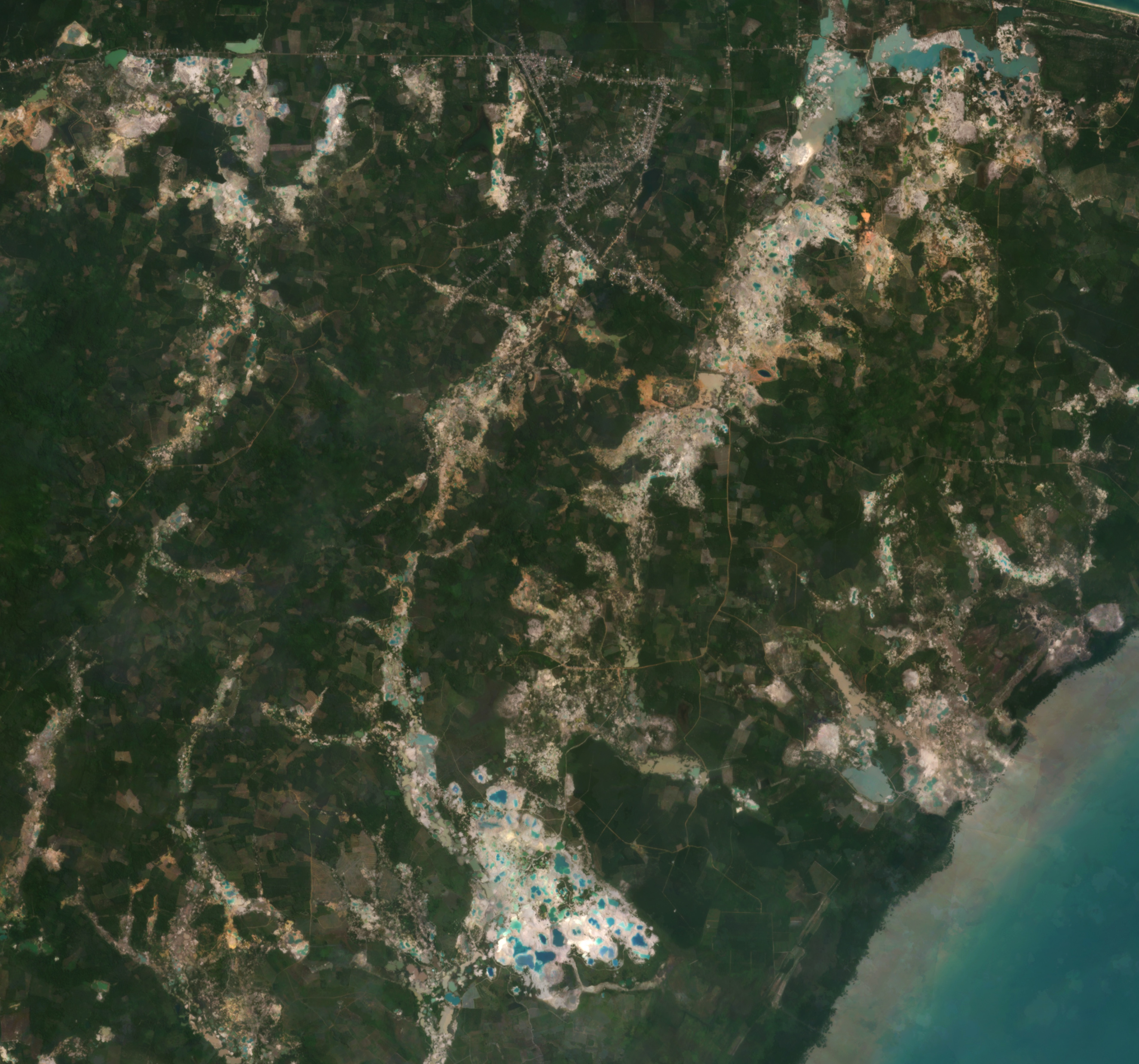
Satellite imagery showing tin mining scars on Bangka Island, Indonesia.

=== Tin and environmental issues ===
Since circa 1710, Bangka has been one of the world's main tin-producing centers. Tin production is a government monopoly in Indonesia. There is a tin smelter at Muntok. Indonesia is the second-largest tin producer and exporter in the world. Indonesia's largest tin production is produced on Bangka Island which makes it a strategic area for Indonesia in terms of world tin trade. But heavy tin exploitation caused environmental damage and much of the land suffers from infertility after being turned into (often illegal) tin mine. Irresponsible miners let the mine land become trenches filled with water and the surrounding land becomes arid with nothing to grow. This is a critical environmental issue. The watery mines peppering the island often become home to saltwater crocodiles that have been displaced from their natural mangrove habitat, and this situation has contributed to increased crocodile attacks on people.

=== Other ===
White pepper is also produced on the island.

== Demographics ==
The majority of the inhabitants are Malays and Chinese, mostly Hakkas. The population is split between those work on the tin mines, palm oil plantations, rubber plantations, fisherman and those who work on pepper farms.

== See also ==
- List of islands of Indonesia
