= Persipas Pangkalpinang =

Indonesian football club

Persipas
- Full name: Persatuan Sepakbola Indonesia Pangkalpinang Sekitar
- Nickname: Pasukan Keraras
- Ground: Depati Amir Stadium
- Capacity: 15,000
- Owner: PSSI Pangkalpinang City
- Chairman: Achmad Subari
- League: Liga 4
- 2021: 5th in Group A, (Bangka Belitung Islands zone)
Home colours	Away colours

Persatuan Sepakbola Indonesia Pangkalpinang Sekitar (simply known as Persipas) is an Indonesian football club based in Pangkalpinang, the capital of Bangka Belitung Islands. They currently compete in the Liga 4. Their best achievement was when in the 2014 Liga Nusantara Bangka Belitung zone, they managed to become champions as well as qualify for the regional round of the 2014 Liga Nusantara. However, in 2018 Liga 3 Bangka Belitung Islands zone, they failed to became champions and finished runners-up in a 3–2 loss to PS Basel.

== Honours ==
- Liga Nusantara Bangka Belitung Islands
  - Champion (1): 2014
- Liga 3 Bangka Belitung Islands
  - Runner-up (1): 2018
