= Koba, Indonesia =

Coordinates: 2°28′56″N 106°23′42″E

Koba (Indonesian pronunciation: [ˈkoba]) is a town (kelurahan) and an administrative district (kecamatan) in the Indonesian province of Bangka-Belitung, Indonesia. Koba is a port located on the east coat of the island of Bangka, and is the administrative centre of the Central Bangka Regency. The district comprises 5 kelurahan (Arung Dalam, Berok, Koba, Padang Mulia and Simpang Perlang) and 6 rural villages (desa).

== Demographics ==
As at mid 2025, the district covers a land area of 390.56 km^{2}, and contained 46,500 inhabitants. The majority of the people in Koba are Hakka Chinese and Malay. Majority of Chinese are Buddhism, Catholic and Protestant.

== Climate ==
Koba has a tropical rainforest climate (Af) with heavy rainfall year-round.

Climate data for Koba
Month	Jan	Feb	Mar	Apr	May	Jun	Jul	Aug	Sep	Oct	Nov	Dec	Year
Mean daily maximum °C (°F)	29.2 (84.6)	29.7 (85.5)	30.3 (86.5)	31.0 (87.8)	31.4 (88.5)	31.0 (87.8)	30.9 (87.6)	31.4 (88.5)	31.5 (88.7)	31.3 (88.3)	30.6 (87.1)	29.6 (85.3)	30.7 (87.2)
Daily mean °C (°F)	26.3 (79.3)	26.7 (80.1)	26.9 (80.4)	27.4 (81.3)	27.7 (81.9)	27.4 (81.3)	27.3 (81.1)	27.6 (81.7)	27.6 (81.7)	27.7 (81.9)	27.1 (80.8)	26.6 (79.9)	27.2 (81.0)
Mean daily minimum °C (°F)	23.5 (74.3)	23.7 (74.7)	23.6 (74.5)	23.9 (75.0)	24.1 (75.4)	23.9 (75.0)	23.8 (74.8)	23.8 (74.8)	23.8 (74.8)	24.2 (75.6)	23.7 (74.7)	23.7 (74.7)	23.8 (74.9)
Average precipitation mm (inches)	258 (10.2)	159 (6.3)	223 (8.8)	243 (9.6)	213 (8.4)	188 (7.4)	141 (5.6)	126 (5.0)	140 (5.5)	183 (7.2)	249 (9.8)	273 (10.7)	2,396 (94.5)
Source: Climate-Data.org
