= Pasir Padi =

Beach on the island of Bangka, Indonesia

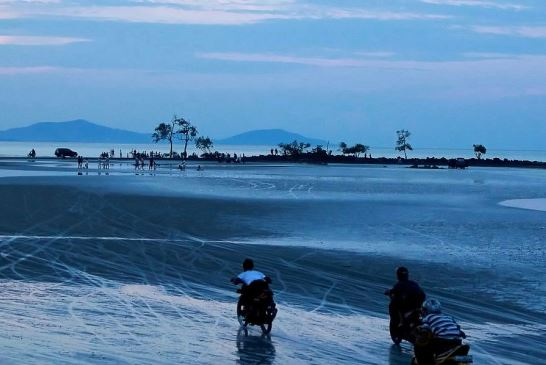

Pasir Padi Beach is one of the beaches on the island of Bangka. The beach is facing directly into the South China Sea. Has a coastline of 300 meters with calm waves, color white sand and dense. Pasir Padi Beach area is an area of tourism potential in Pangkal Pinang. Visitors from outside the region or abroad, both of which arrived through Depati Amir Airport and the Port of Pangkal Balam, can go straight to the beach.
