= 2024 South Bangka regency election =

Local election in Indonesia

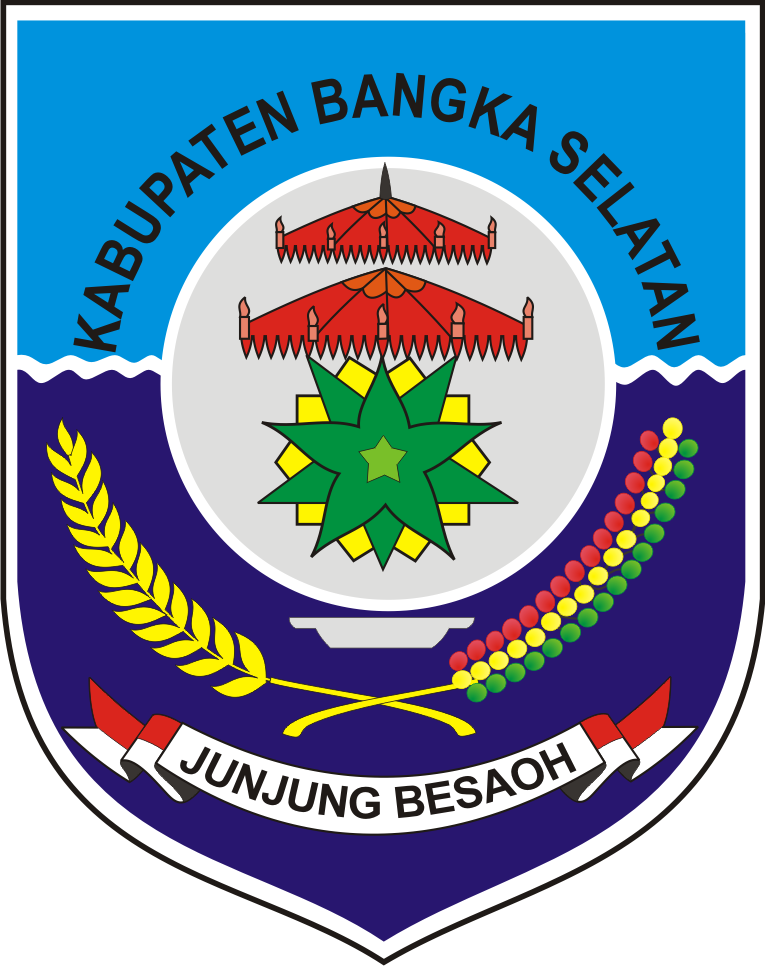
- 27 November 2024
- Turnout: 52.98%
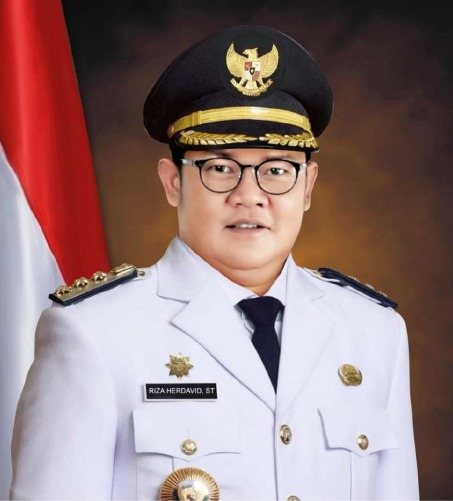

Candidate	Riza Herdavid	Blank box
Party	PDI-P
Running mate	Debby Vita
Popular vote	64,795	12,134
Percentage	81.27	18.73
Regent before election
Riza Herdavid
PDI-P
Elected Regent
Riza Herdavid
PDI-P

The 2024 South Bangka regency election was held on 27 November 2024 as part of nationwide local elections to elect the regent of South Bangka Regency in the Bangka Belitung Islands for a five-year term. The previous election was held in 2020. Incumbent regent Riza Herdavid ran in an uncontested election and won 81.27 percent of the votes against the blank box option.

== Electoral system ==
The election, like other local elections in 2024, follow the first-past-the-post system where the candidate with the most votes wins the election, even if they do not win a majority. It is possible for a candidate to run uncontested, in which case the candidate is still required to win a majority of votes "against" an "empty box" option. Should the candidate fail to do so, the election will be repeated on a later date.

== Candidates ==
According to electoral regulations, in order to qualify for the election, candidates are required to secure support from a political party or a coalition of parties controlling 6 seats (20 percent of all seats) in the South Bangka Regional House of Representatives (DPRD). The Indonesian Democratic Party of Struggle, with 6 seats from the 2024 legislative election, is the only party eligible to nominate a candidate without forming a coalition with other parties. Candidates may alternatively demonstrate support to run as an independent in form of photocopies of identity cards, which in South Bangka's case corresponds to 14,908 copies. No independent candidates registered with the General Elections Commission (KPU) prior to the deadline on 12 May 2024.

=== Potential ===
The following are individuals who have either been publicly mentioned as a potential candidate by a political party in the DPRD, publicly declared their candidacy with press coverage, or considered as a potential candidate by media outlets:

- Riza Herdavid (PDI-P), incumbent regent.

- Debby Vita Dewi, incumbent vice regent.

- Nursyamsu H Ilyas, former vice regent and former speaker of the regency DPRD.
- Eddy Supriadi, former regional secretary of South Bangka.

== Political map ==
Following the 2024 Indonesian legislative election, eleven political parties are represented in the South Bangka DPRD:

Political parties	Seat count
Indonesian Democratic Party of Struggle (PDI-P)	6 / 30
Great Indonesia Movement Party (Gerindra)	4 / 30
Democratic Party (Demokrat)	4 / 30
Party of Functional Groups (Golkar)	3 / 30
NasDem Party	3 / 30
National Awakening Party (PKB)	3 / 30
National Mandate Party (PAN)	2 / 30
Prosperous Justice Party (PKS)	2 / 30
United Development Party (PPP)	1 / 30
Perindo Party	1 / 30
Crescent Star Party (PBB)	1 / 30
