= PS Basel =

Indonesian football club

- Full name: Persatuan Sepakbola Bangka Selatan
- Nicknames: Laskar Urang Habang; Laskar Batin Tikal
- Founded: 2012; 14 years ago
- Ground: Junjung Besaoh Stadium; Toboali, South Bangka, Bangka Belitung Islands
- Capacity: 1,000
- Chairman: Jalalludin
- Coach: Nirwan Setiawan
- League: Liga 4
- 2021: 5th in Group B, (Bangka Belitung Islands zone)
| Home colours | Away colours |

PS Basel is an Indonesian football club based in Toboali, South Bangka Regency, Bangka Belitung Islands. They are currently playing at Liga 4 and their homebase is Junjung Besaoh Stadium.

== Honours ==
- Liga 3 Bangka Belitung Islands
  - Champions: 2018
