= PS Beltim =

Indonesian football club

- Full name: Persatuan Sepakbola Belitung Timur
- Nickname: Laskar Keramat Bujang
- Founded: 2003; 23 years ago
- Ground: Rimba Plawan Stadium; East Belitung, Bangka Belitung Islands
- Capacity: 10,000
- Owner: PSSI East Belitung
- Chairman: Nadiarsyah
- Manager: Agus Setiawan
- Coach: Darma Wijaya
- League: Liga 4
- 2023: 1st, (Bangka Belitung Islands zone); Round of 32, (National)
Home colours	Away colours

Persatuan Sepakbola Belitung Timur (simply known as PS Beltim) is an Indonesian football club based in East Belitung, Bangka Belitung Islands. They currently compete in Liga 4 Bangka Belitung Islands zone.

== Honours ==
- ISC Liga Nusantara Bangka Belitung Islands
  - Champion (1): 2016
- Liga 3 Bangka Belitung Islands
  - Champion (1): 2023
  - Third-place (1): 2021
- U17 Soeratin Cup Bangka Belitung Islands
  - Champion (1): 2017

== Supporters ==
The Penebok (Penggemar Bola Nekat lit. Reckless Football Fans) are the name of the supporter group of PS Beltim. Founded in 2013.
