= Central Bangka Regency =

Regency in Bangka Belitung Islands, Indonesia

Central Bangka Regency Kabupaten Bangka Tengah
- Regency
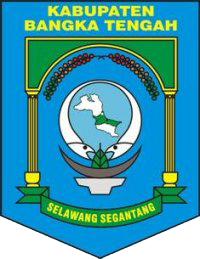
- Coat of arms
- Motto: Selawang Segantang
- Location within Bangka Belitung Islands

- Location in Sumatra and Indonesia Central Bangka Regency (Indonesia)
- Coordinates: 2°25′S 106°14′E
- Country: Indonesia
- Province: Bangka Belitung Islands
- Regency seat: Koba

Government
  - Regent: Algafry Rahman
  - Vice Regent: Efrianda

Area
  - Total: 2,259.98 km^{2} (872.58 sq mi)

Population (mid 2025 estimate)
  - Total: 211,989
  - Density: 93.8013/km^{2} (242.944/sq mi)
- Time zone: UTC+7 (IWST)
- Area code: (+62) 718
- Website: bangkatengahkab.go.id

Central Bangka Regency is a regency (kabupaten) of the Bangka Belitung Islands Province, Indonesia. It is situated on Bangka Island and was created on 25 February 2003 from what had previously been part of Bangka Regency. It borders on the residual Bangka Regency and the city of Pangkalpinang to the north and to South Bangka Regency to the south. It covers a land area of 2,259.98 km^{2} and had a population of 161,075 at the 2010 Census, rising to 198,946 at the 2020 Census; the official estimate as of mid 2025 was 211,989 (comprising 109,675 males and 102,314 females). The regency headquarters is in the town of Koba.

== Administrative districts ==
The Regency is divided into six districts (kecamatan), tabulated below with their areas and their populations at the 2010 Census and 2020 Census, together with the official estimates as of mid 2025. The table also includes the numbers of administrative villages in each district (totaling 56 rural desa and 7 urban kelurahan), and its postal code.

Kode Wilayah	Name of District (kecamatan)	Area in km^{2}	Pop'n Census 2010	Pop'n Census 2020	Pop'n Estimate mid 2025	Admin centre	No. of villages	Post code
19.04.01	Koba ^{(a)}	390.56	34,808	42,929	46,500	Koba	11 ^{(b)}	33681
19.04.06	Lubuk Besar ^{(c)}	545.92	22,712	31,153	35,400	Lubuk Besar	9	33682
19.04.02	Pangkalan Baru ^{(c)}	103.84	37,473	46,027	45,000	Dul	12 ^{(d)}	33684
19.04.05	Namang	203.46	13,912	16,837	18,200	Namang	8	33683
19.04.03	Sungai Selan ^{(e)}	789.28	30,048	36,073	39,100	Sungai Selan	13 ^{(f)}	33675
19.04.04	Simpang Katis	226.94	22,275	25,927	27,700	Simpang Katis	10	33674
	Totals	2,259.98	161,228	198,946	211,989	Koba	63	

Notes: (a) includes 8 offshore islands. (b) comprises 5 kelurahan (Arung Dalam, Berok, Koba, Padang Mulia and Simpang Perlang) and 6 desa.
(c) includes 3 offshore islands. (d) includes one kelurahan (Dul). (e) includes 6 offshore islands. (f) includes one kelurahan (Sungai Selan).
