= Sungailiat =

Sungailiat Liet-kong
- District

Other transcription(s)
  - Jawi: سوڠايليات
  - Mandarin: 双溪利亚 (Simplified) 雙溪利亞 (Traditional); Shuāng xī lì yǎ (Pinyin)
  - Hakka: 烈港 (Hanzi); Lîet-kóng (Pha̍k-fa-sṳ)
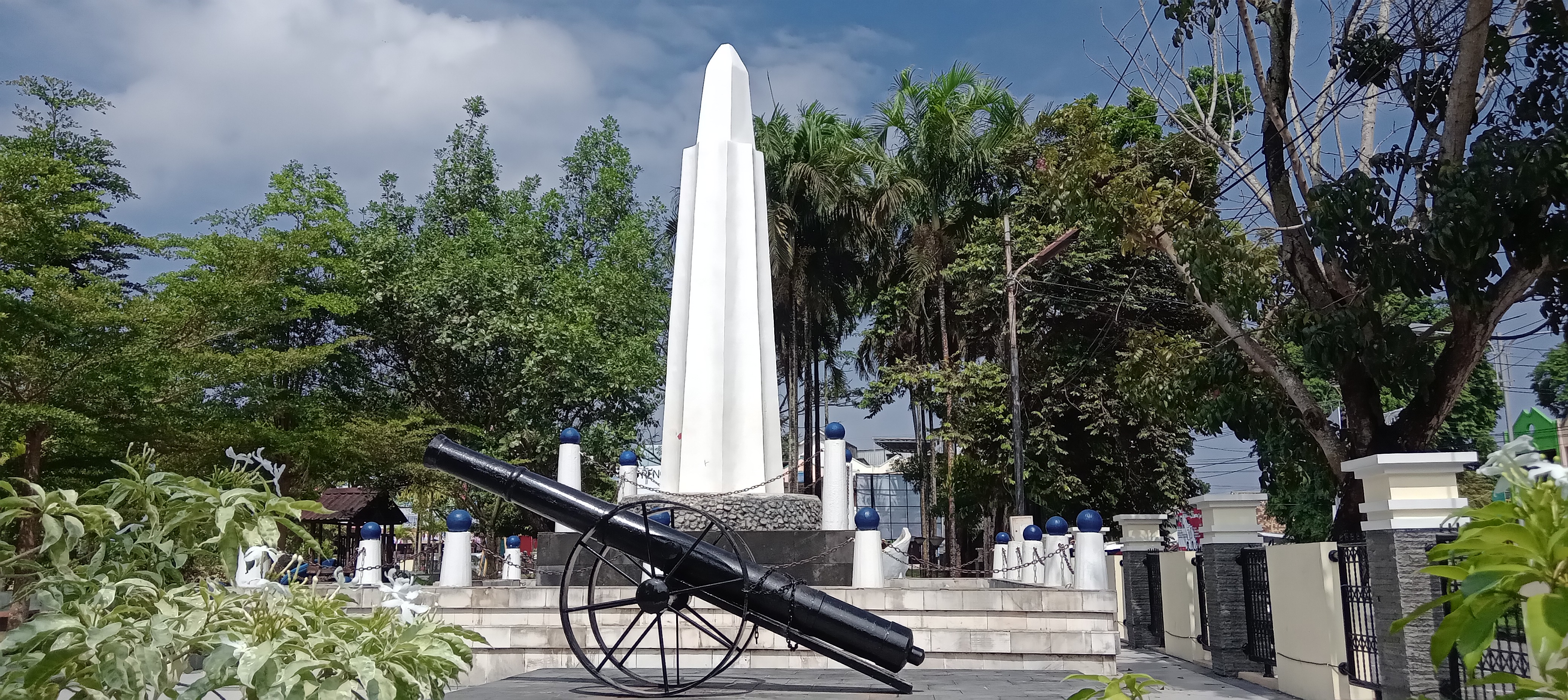
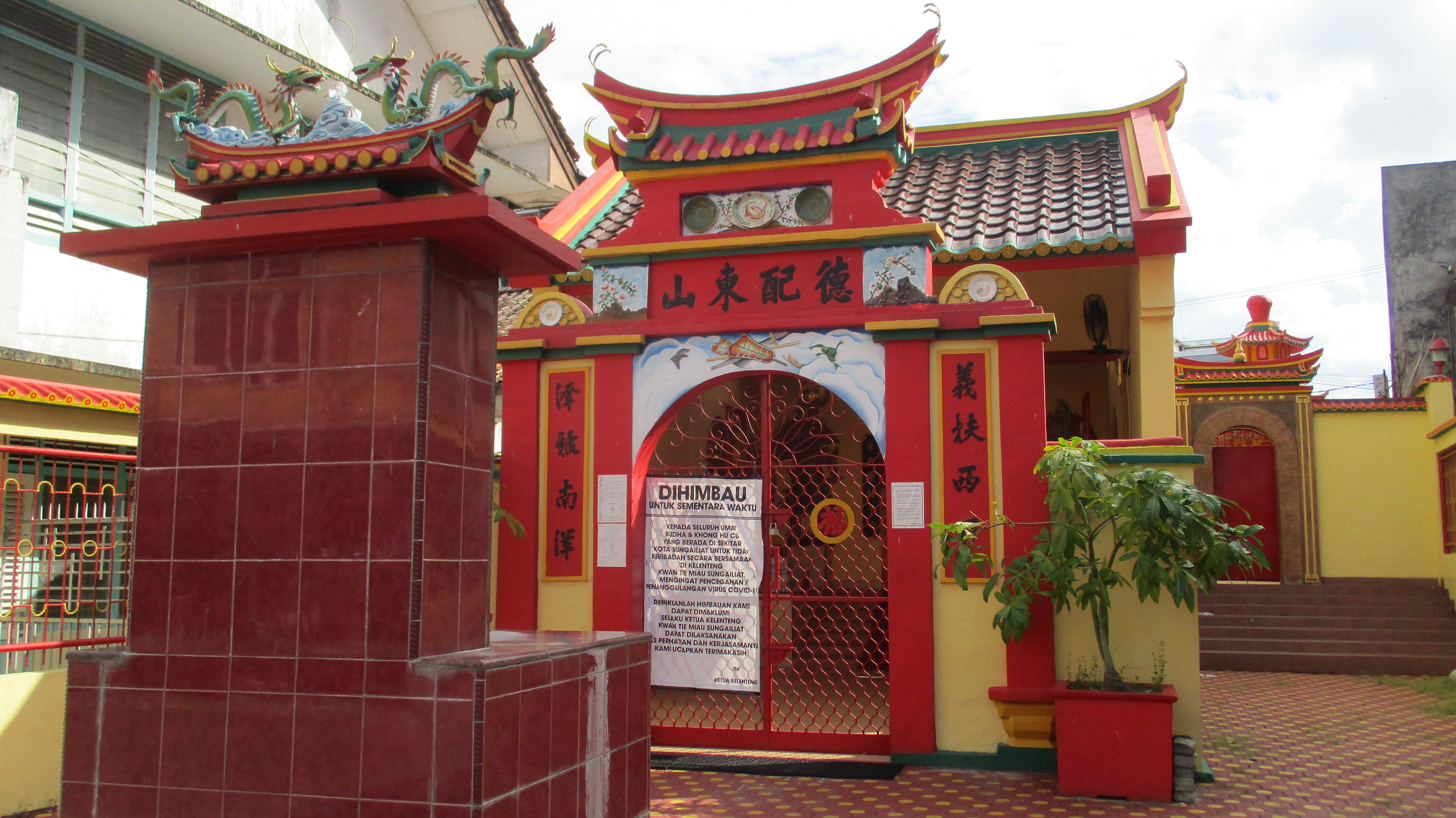
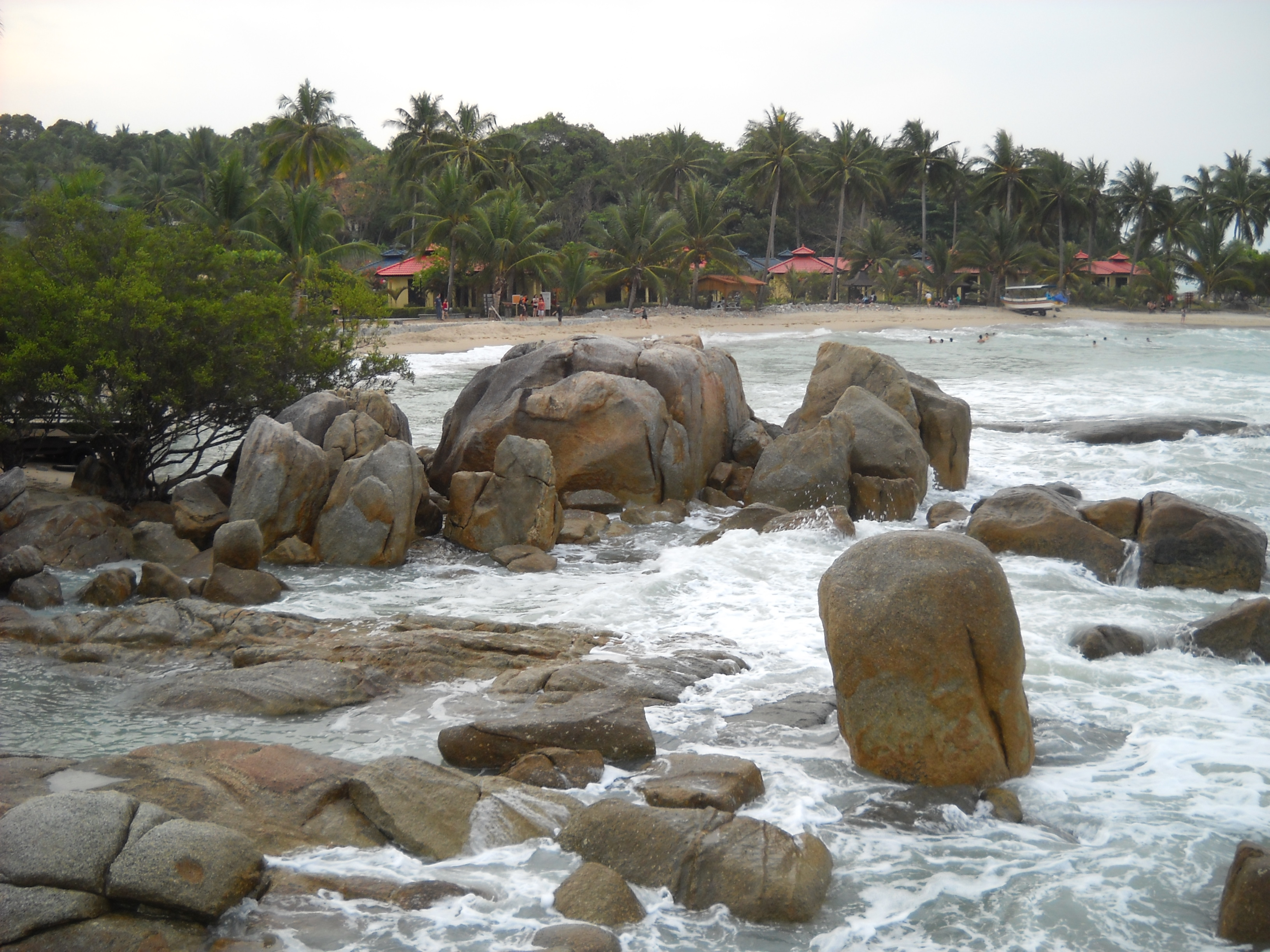
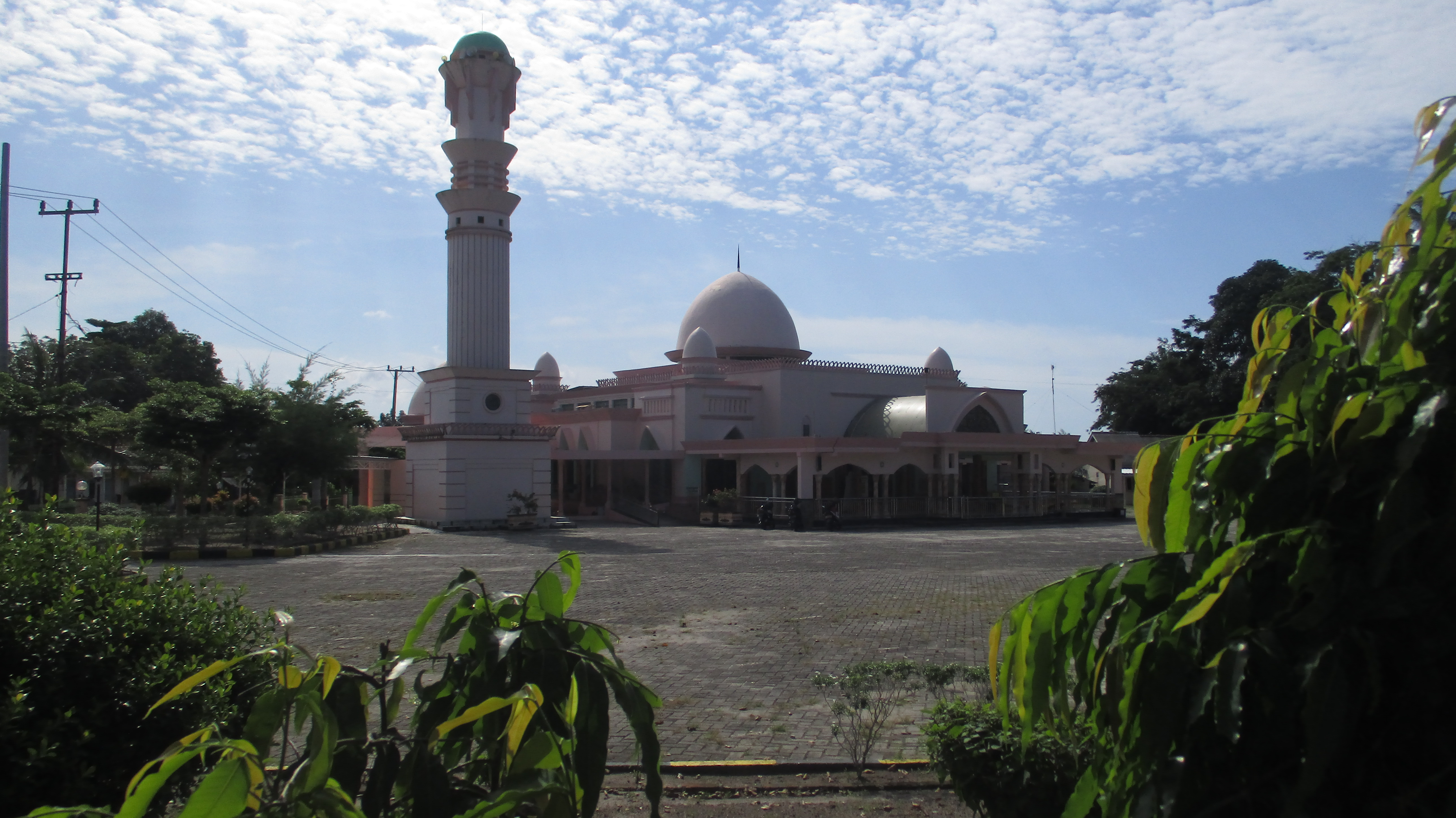
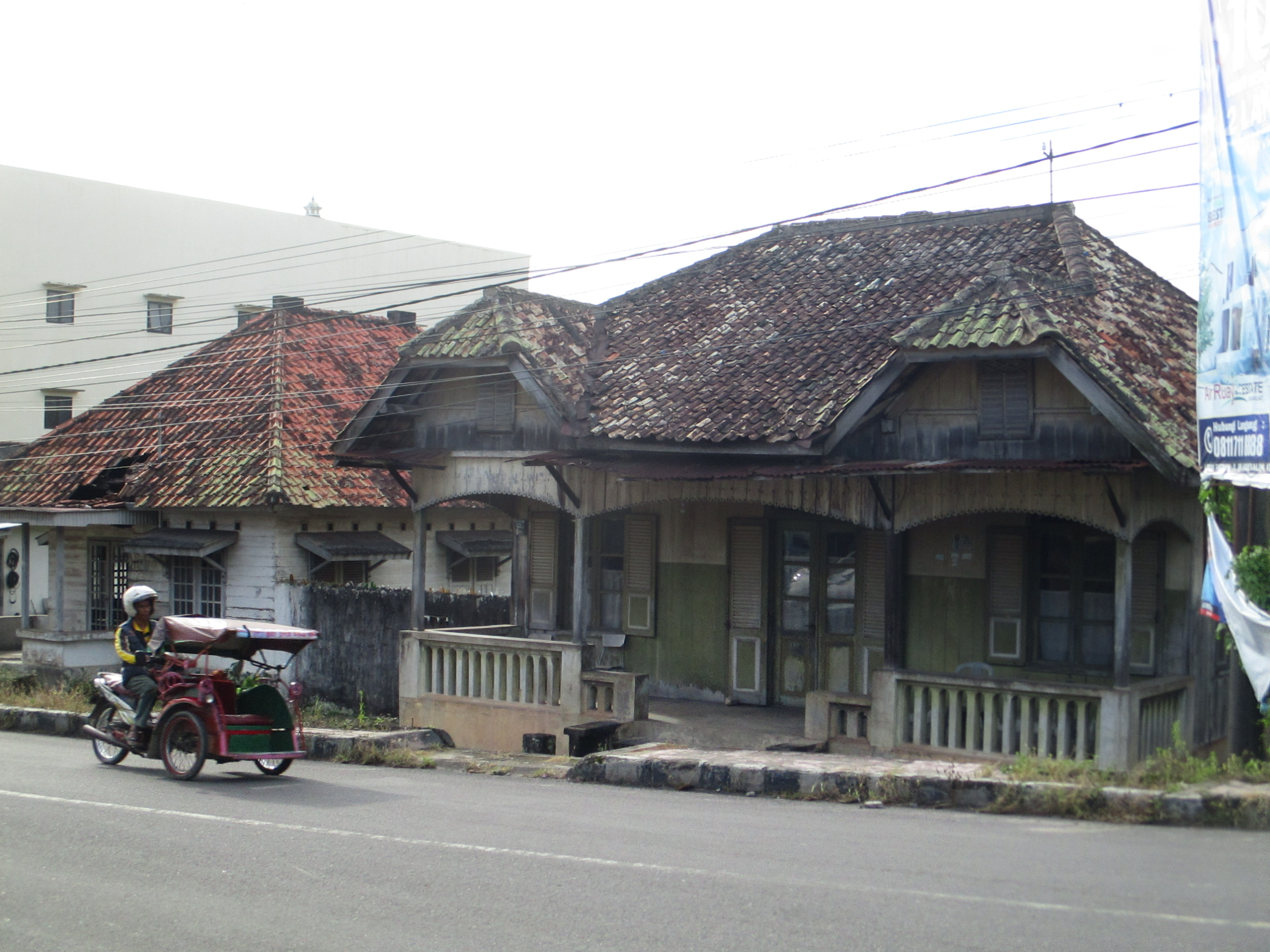
- Zero kilometer mark · Kwan Ti Miau temple · Parai Tenggiri beach · Al Ittihad mosque · contemporary architecture

- Location of Sungailiat in Bangka-Belitung
- Coordinates: 1°51′20.7″S 106°7′3.4″E
- Country: Indonesia
- Province: Bangka Belitung Islands
- Regency: Bangka Regency

Area
  - Total: 146.38 km^{2} (56.52 sq mi)

Population (2025)
  - Total: 97,320
  - Density: 664.8/km^{2} (1,722/sq mi)
- Time zone: UTC+7 (Western Indonesia Time)
- Area code: +62717

Sungailiat
- Traditional Chinese: 雙溪利亞
- Simplified Chinese: 双溪利亚
Transcriptions
Standard Mandarin
- Hanyu Pinyin: Shuāng xī lì yǎ
Hakka
- Romanization: Yu-hâi-li-á
Yue: Cantonese
- Jyutping: jau6 kai1 lei6 aa3
Southern Min
- Hokkien POJ: Iū-khoe-lāi-a

Liet-kong
- Chinese: 烈港
Transcriptions
Hakka
- Romanization: Lîet-kóng

Sungailiat, also known as Liet-kong in Hakka, is a town and district (kecamatan) of Bangka Regency, in the Bangka-Belitung province of Indonesia. It is also the regency seat.

It is the second-largest settlement on the island, right after the provincial capital of Pangkal Pinang. The town is located on the eastern coast of the island, about 30 km (19 mi) north of Pangkal Pinang, to which it is connected by a paved road.

The district is sub-divided into 13 villages, consisting of one desa/village and 12 kelurahan/urban village.

== History ==
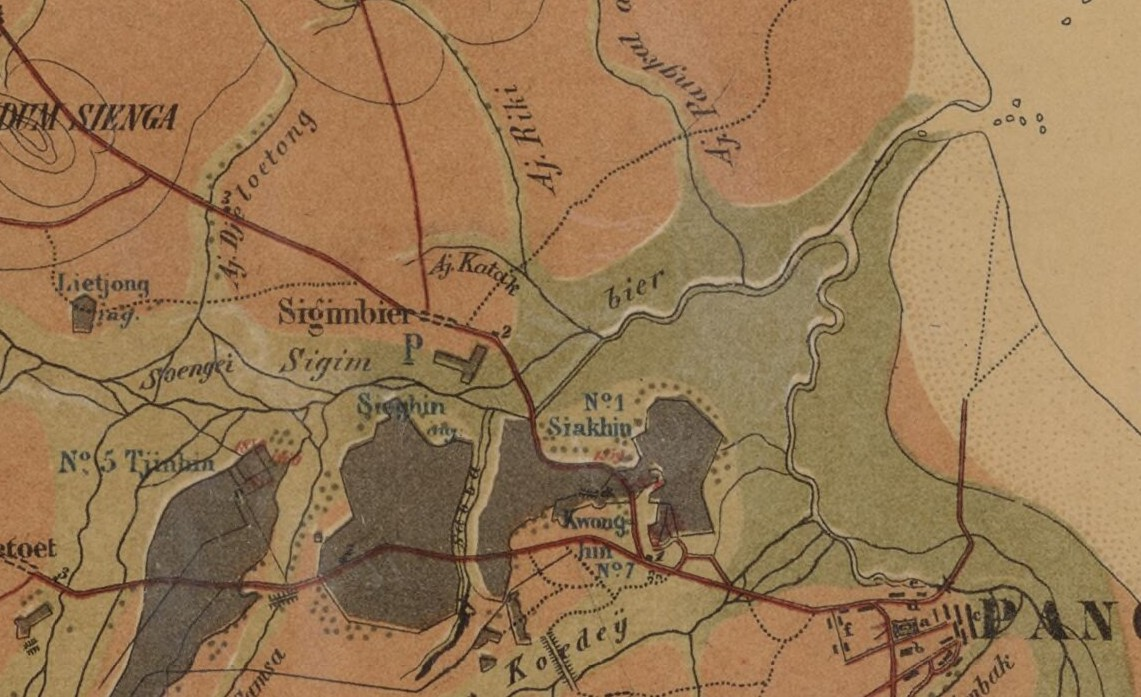
A historical map from 1873 shows that the downtown of Sungailiat could be accessed by boats entering the Sigimbier and Sungailiat rivers, which have now lost their function due to massive destruction by tin mining over hundreds of years. The rivers are now just names on old maps.

The name Sungailiat is believed to derive from a toponym, using what locals call their place with an abundance of river. They once call the place Sungai Lihat, which means “seeing the river” in Malay. This name then got changed into Sungailiat so it could be easier to call. However, the original river of Sungai Lihat has been lost due to large-scale tin mining.

And like its other Bangka island counterparts, its first settlers are Bangka Malays and began to be inhabited by various people of different ethnicities, such as Chinese Indonesians.

The anniversary of Sungailiat was determined based on a governmental team meeting on June 13, 1995, as well as the results of workshop and exposes about the anniversary/birth of Sungailiat City by the Regent of the Head of the Level II Region of Bangka on November 20, 1995, and January 15, 1996, guiding the final formulation results from the formulation team who have received input and feedback either through mass communications, or direct responses from both community and traditional leaders residing there or other resources, especially supported by various data and with scientific evidence, the team shall formulate and determine that the date of founding was on the 7th of Rabiʽ al-Awwal or Rabiul Awal in 1186 H or coincides with 27 April 1766 CE.

On 13 May 1971, Soeharto, the second president of Indonesia appointed this city as the capital of Bangka, but then cancelled, making Pangkalpinang as its capital instead until this day.

== Economy ==
As with many settlements in the province, the economy is heavily affected by the mining and processing of tin, very abundant in the area. The locals are also engaged in fisheries and agriculture, cultivating rubber trees, pepper, and, to a lesser degree, palm oil. Small enterprises also exist, processing raw products from the aforementioned industries into light foods, like pork and fishes. and also culinary. Restaurants are rapidly growing in the areas and many tourist attractions are rapidly built and developed by both the government and the people.

== Tourism ==
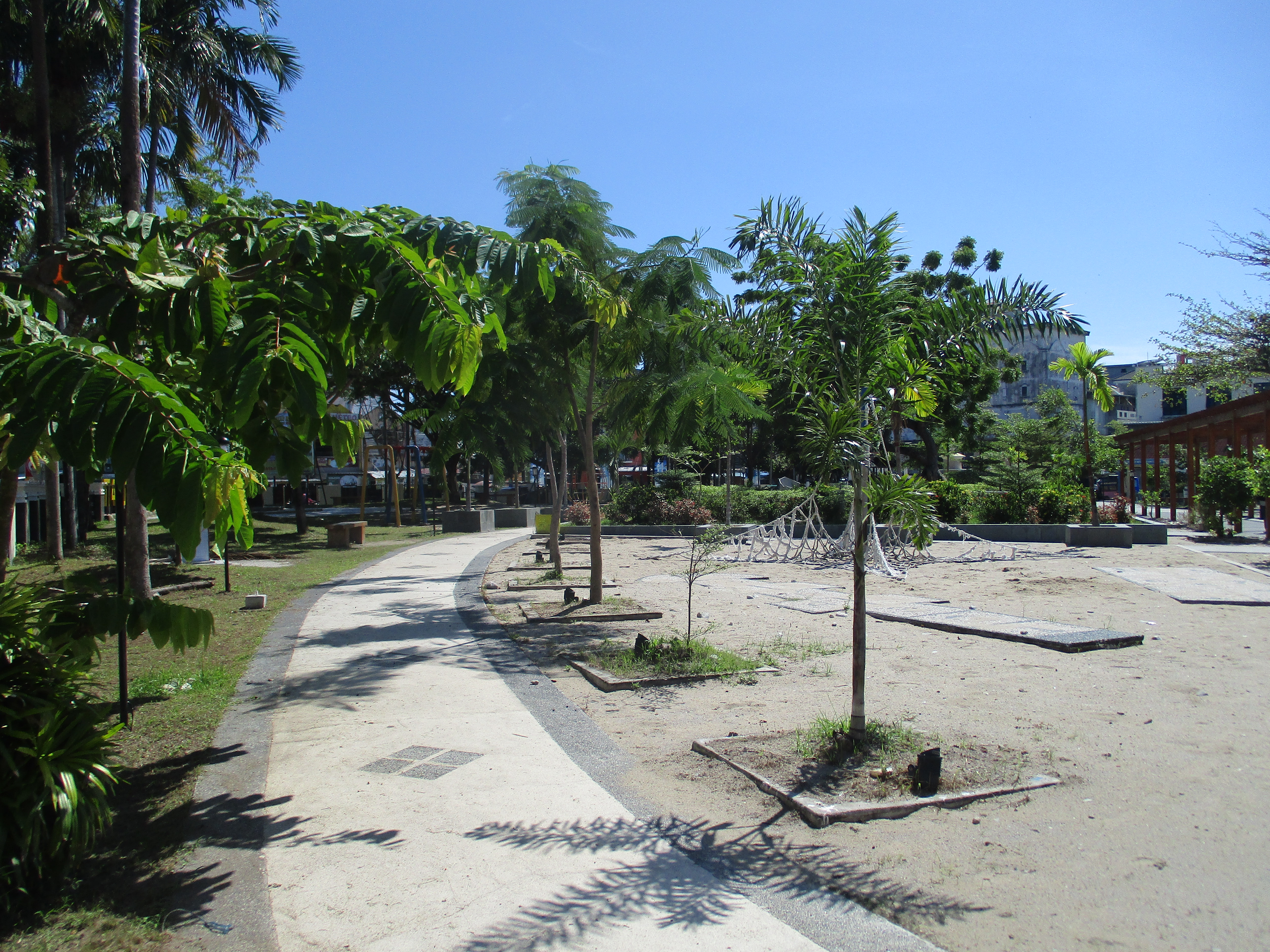
Sungailiat city park

Tourism is a growing and well-established sector. A number of Buddhist and Taoist temples, alongside coastal aquatic and thermal sites including Tongaci beach, Rambak beach, Tikus Emas beach, Parai beach, Tanjung Pesona beach, and Pemali hot springs are situated within the town's municipal boundaries and draw domestic visitors from elsewhere in the country.

== Climate ==
Sungailiat has a tropical rainforest climate (Köppen: Af) with heavy to very heavy rainfall year-round.

Climate data for Sungailiat
Month	Jan	Feb	Mar	Apr	May	Jun	Jul	Aug	Sep	Oct	Nov	Dec	Year
Mean daily maximum °C (°F)	29.5 (85.1)	30.0 (86.0)	30.6 (87.1)	31.2 (88.2)	31.5 (88.7)	31.2 (88.2)	31.0 (87.8)	31.4 (88.5)	31.4 (88.5)	31.3 (88.3)	30.7 (87.3)	29.8 (85.6)	30.8 (87.4)
Daily mean °C (°F)	26.5 (79.7)	26.8 (80.2)	27.1 (80.8)	27.5 (81.5)	27.9 (82.2)	27.7 (81.9)	27.6 (81.7)	27.7 (81.9)	27.8 (82.0)	27.8 (82.0)	27.2 (81.0)	26.8 (80.2)	27.4 (81.3)
Mean daily minimum °C (°F)	23.5 (74.3)	23.6 (74.5)	23.7 (74.7)	23.9 (75.0)	24.3 (75.7)	24.2 (75.6)	24.2 (75.6)	24.1 (75.4)	24.2 (75.6)	24.4 (75.9)	23.8 (74.8)	23.8 (74.8)	24.0 (75.2)
Average precipitation mm (inches)	386 (15.2)	241 (9.5)	231 (9.1)	232 (9.1)	248 (9.8)	182 (7.2)	158 (6.2)	128 (5.0)	139 (5.5)	186 (7.3)	306 (12.0)	399 (15.7)	2,836 (111.6)
Source: Climate-Data.org

== Demographics ==
The majority of the people in Sungailiat are Hakka Chinese and Malay. The former are considerably Buddhist, Confucians, Catholic, or Protestant, while the latter are mostly Muslim.

Currently, there are a total of 94,044 Sungailiat residents, mostly living in the Sungailiat Urban Village with a total of 22,295 people living there. The lowest density belongs to Sinar Baru Urban Village with a total of 2,659 residents.

== Administrative areas ==
Sungailiat, according to Bangka's official website Bangka.go.id and ranked by area is divided into:

1. Kenanga Urban Village (26.00 km^{2}; 10.04 sq mi)

2. Rebo Village (19.00 km^{2}; 7.34 sq mi)

3. Parit Padang Urban Village (5.09 km^{2}; 1.97 sq mi)

4. Sri Menanti Urban Village (3.40 km^{2}; 1.31 sq mi)

5. Sungailiat Urban Village (5.65 km^{2}; 2.18 sq mi)

6. Kuday Urban Village (5.75 km^{2}; 2.22 sq mi)

7. Sinar Baru Urban Village (11.78 km^{2}; 4.55 sq mi)

8. Lubuk Kelik Urban Village (8.29 km^{2}; 3.20 sq mi)

9. Surya Timur Urban Village (6.77 km^{2}; 2.61 sq mi)

10. Jelitik Urban Village (22.85 km^{2}; 8.82 sq mi)

11. Bukit Betung Urban Village (5.07 km^{2}; 1.96 sq mi)

12. Sinar Jaya Jelutung Urban Village (13.39 km^{2}; 5.17 sq mi)

13. Matras Urban Village (12.25 km^{2}; 4.73 sq mi)

== Language ==
The official language of the city is Indonesian. Although local languages are also commonly spoken in the city. Local language includes Bangka Malay, the same as its other counterparts in the Bangka Island. The Chinese Indonesians of Sungailiat primarily spoke Hakka while a significant minority spoke Cantonese and Hokkien, as the Hakkas formed the majority of ethnic Chinese population of the city. Sometimes they mixed their language with Bangka Malay as a product of assimilation in culture, creating a Malay based creole language.

== Waste management ==
Sungailiat has a coordinated waste management system currently running to keep the city clean. The final waste disposal site of Sungailiat is located in Kenanga Urban Village, 10 km (6.2 mi) from the center of Sungailiat City. The area prepared for this site is 9 hectares (22 acres) and 3 hectares (7.4 acres) have been used. The management uses an open dumping and composting system with an average volume of 49 m^{3} (1,700 cu ft) of organic waste per day.

To support waste management activities at the Kenanga waste disposal site, 5 bulldozers, monitoring wells, compost houses, office buildings, waste recording boards, waste gas pipes and a floor plan for the landfill site are prepared to support it.

== Historical photographs ==
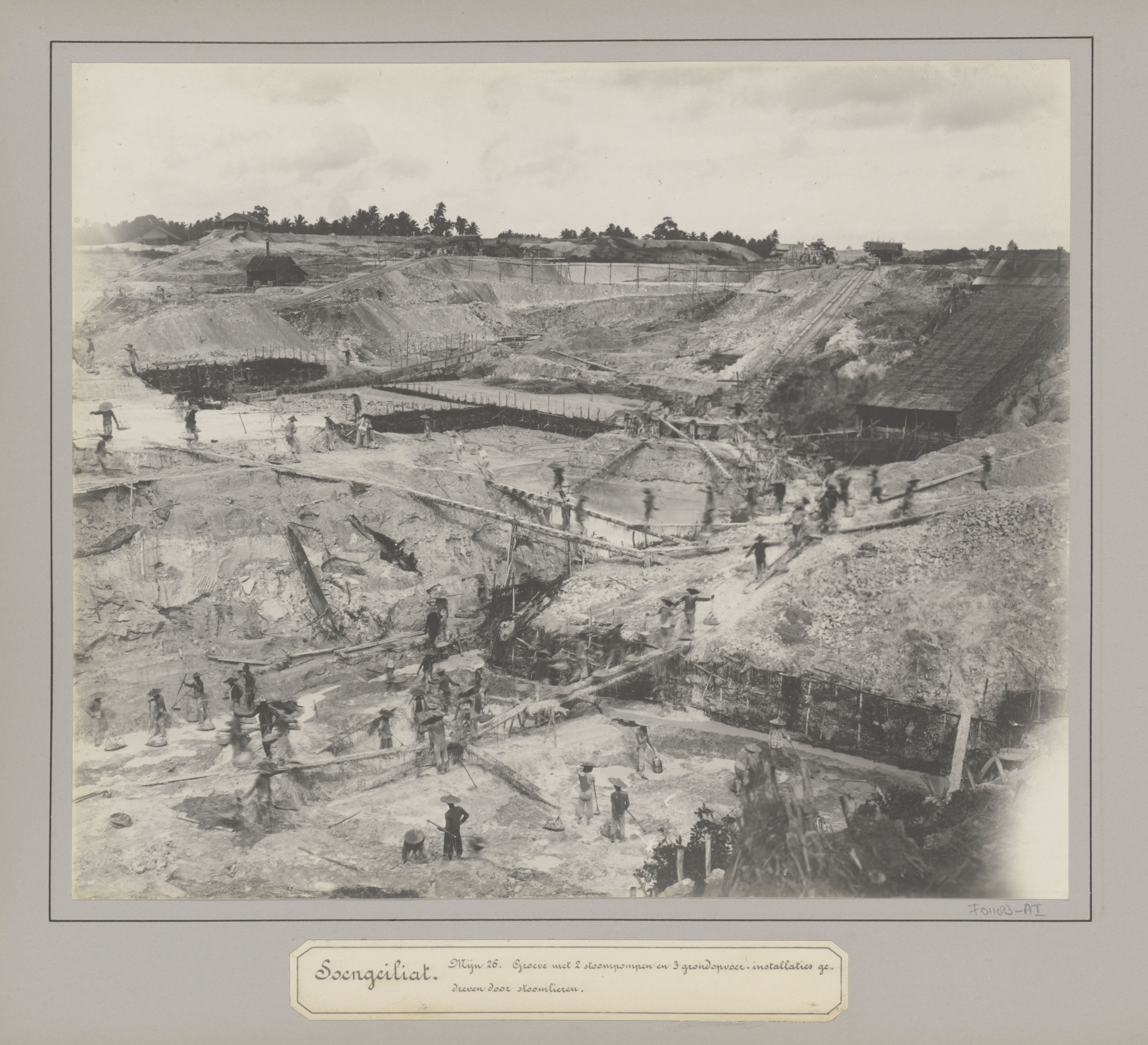
Tin mine

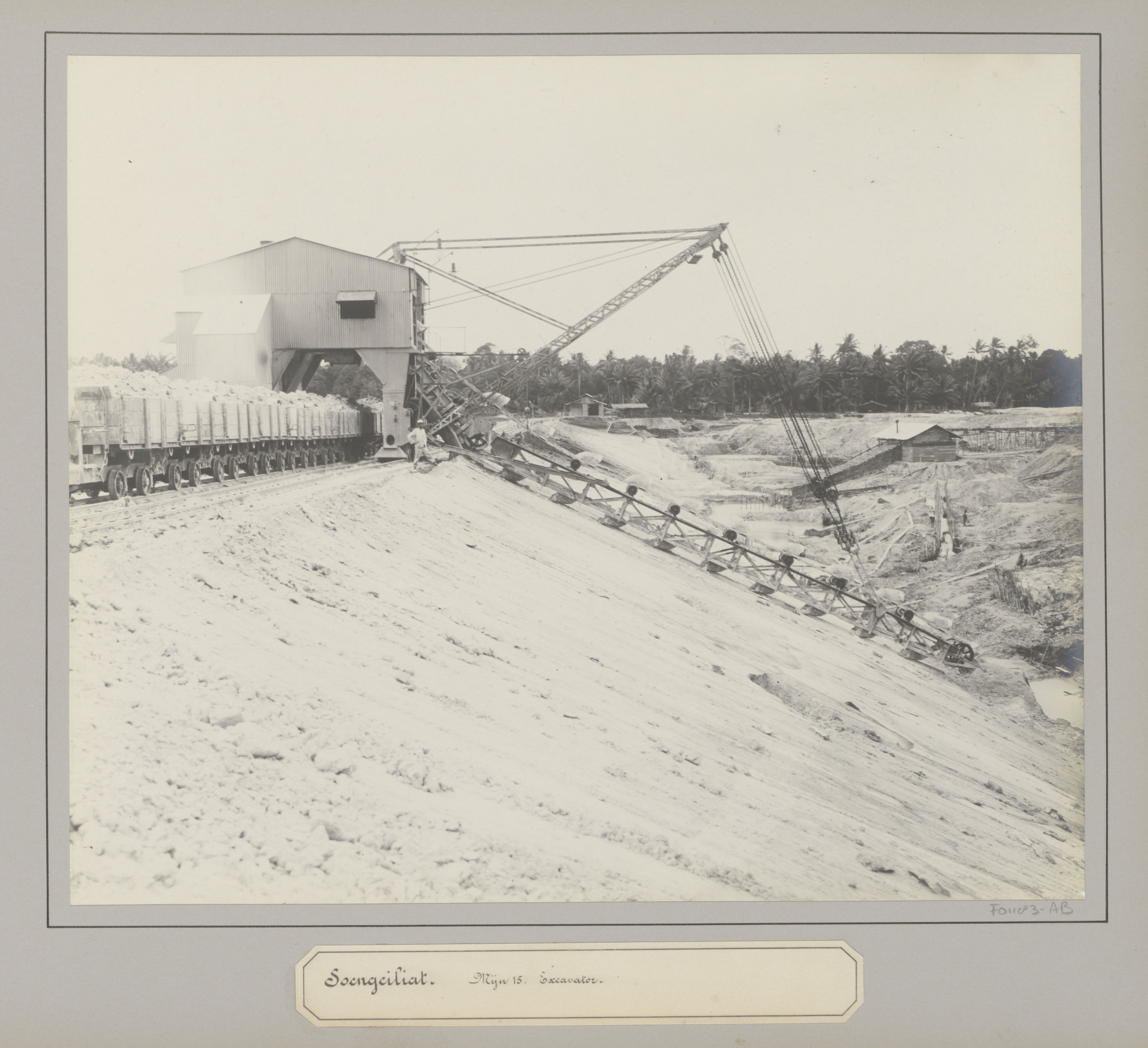
Excavator

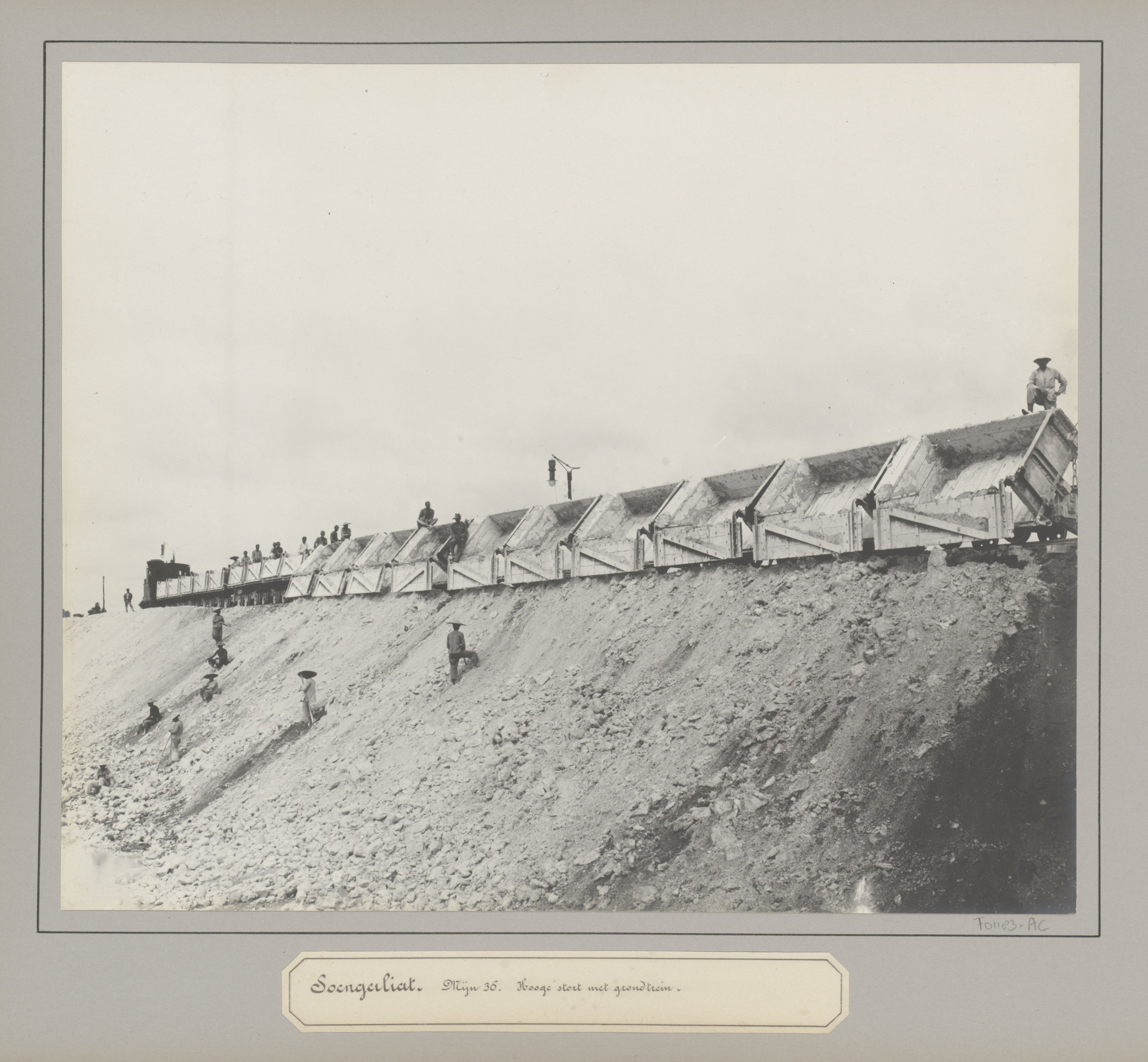
Narrow gauge railway

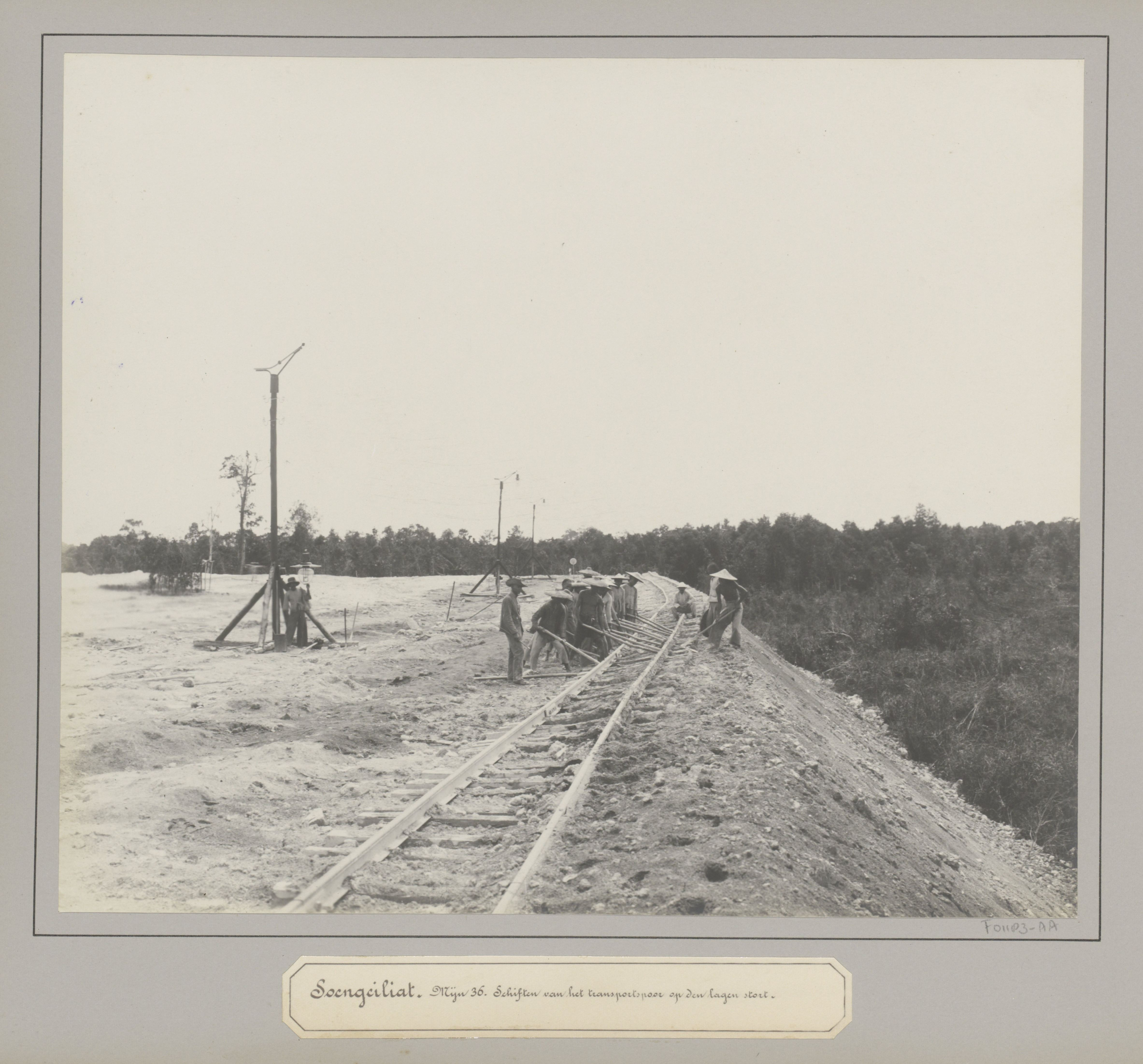
Rail track construction

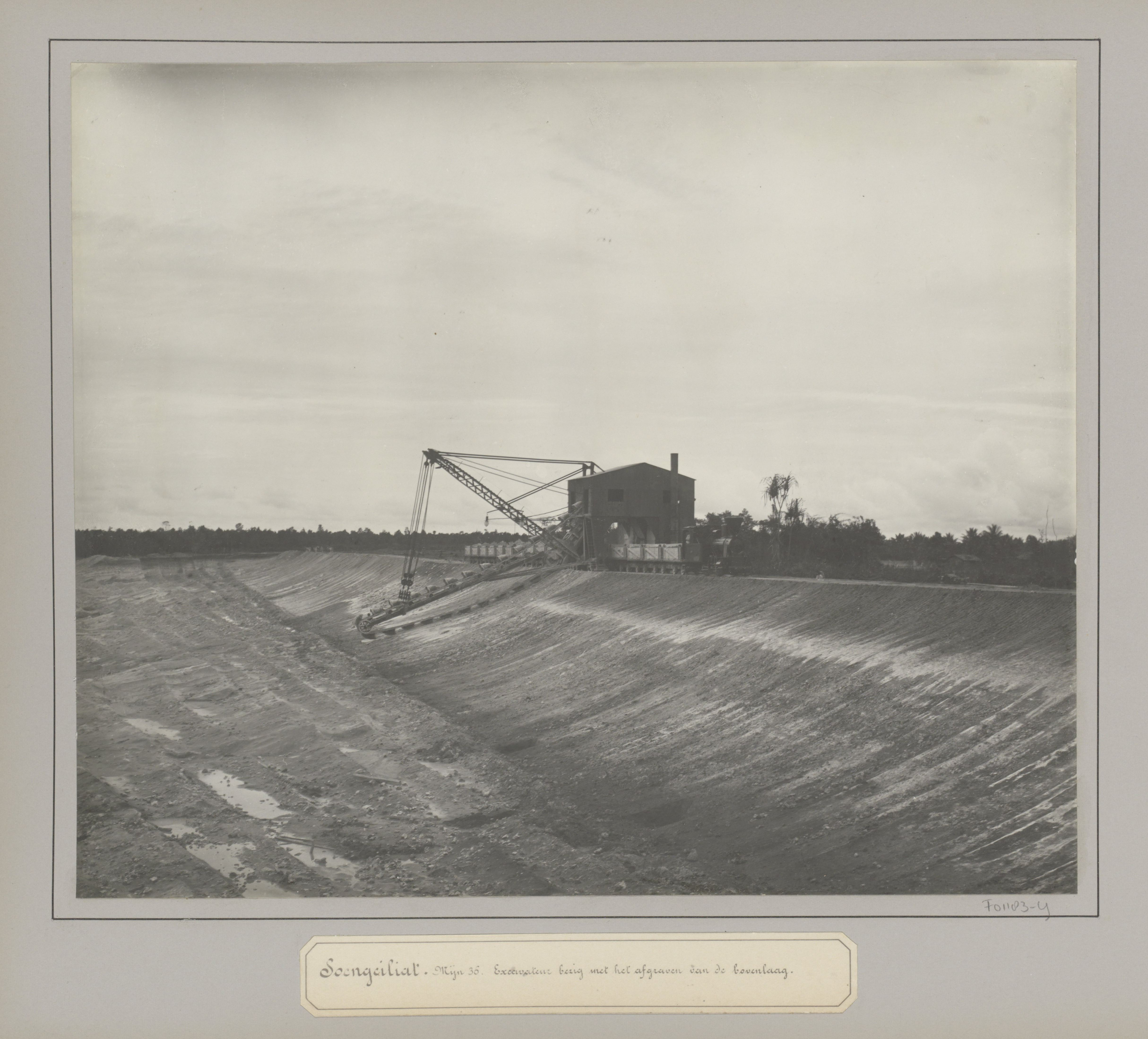
Excavator

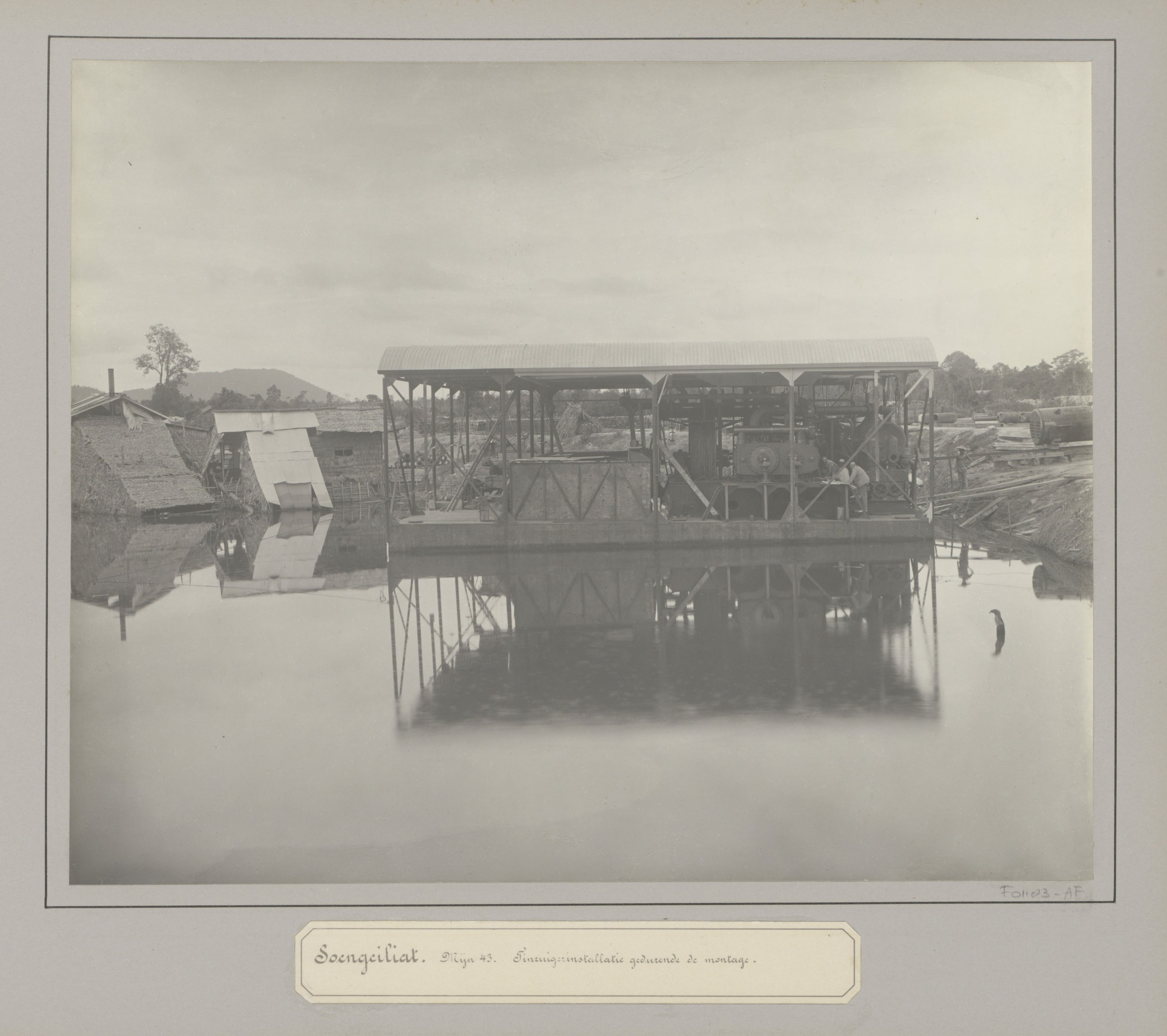
Suction excavator

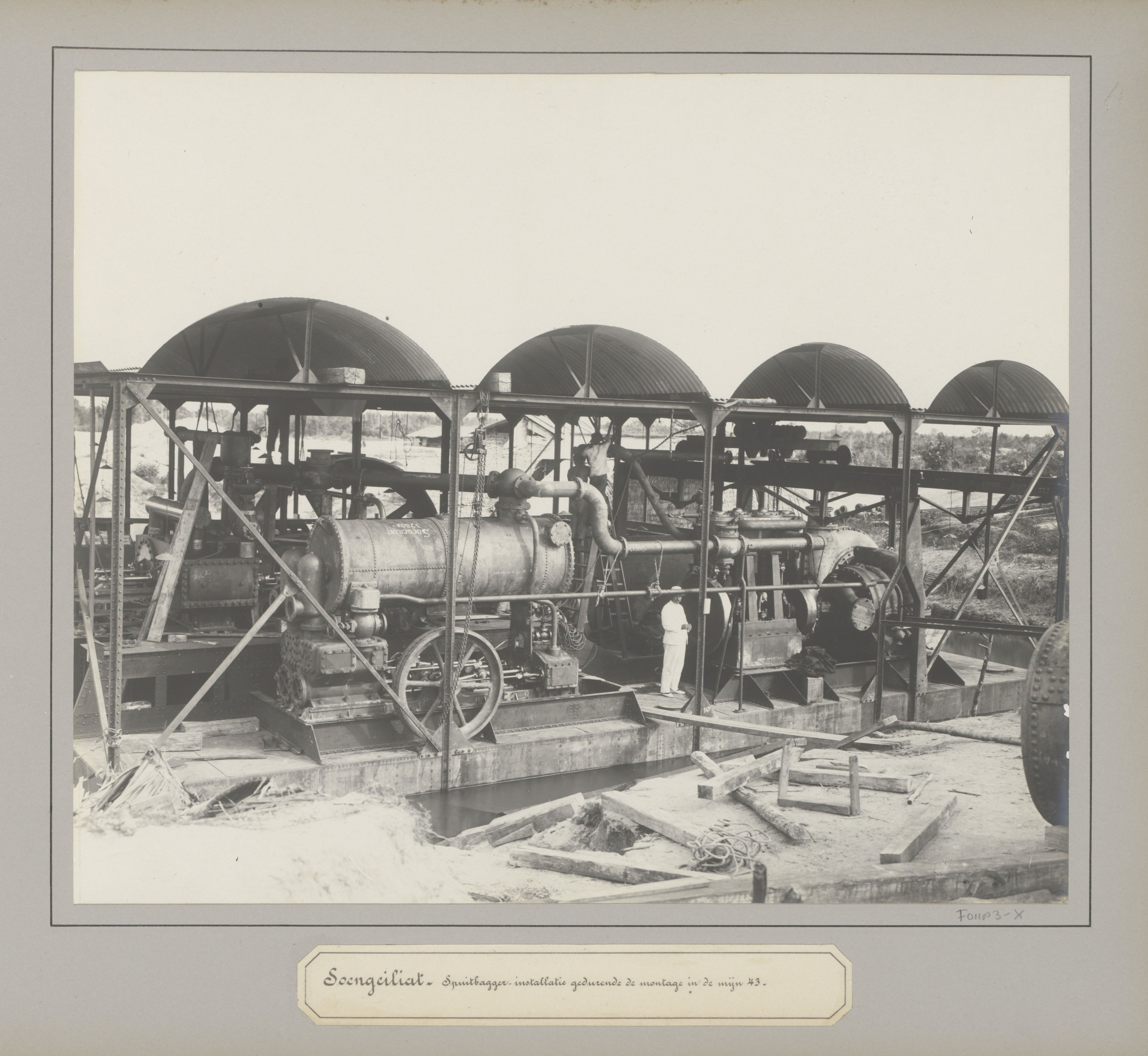
Pump of the suction excavator

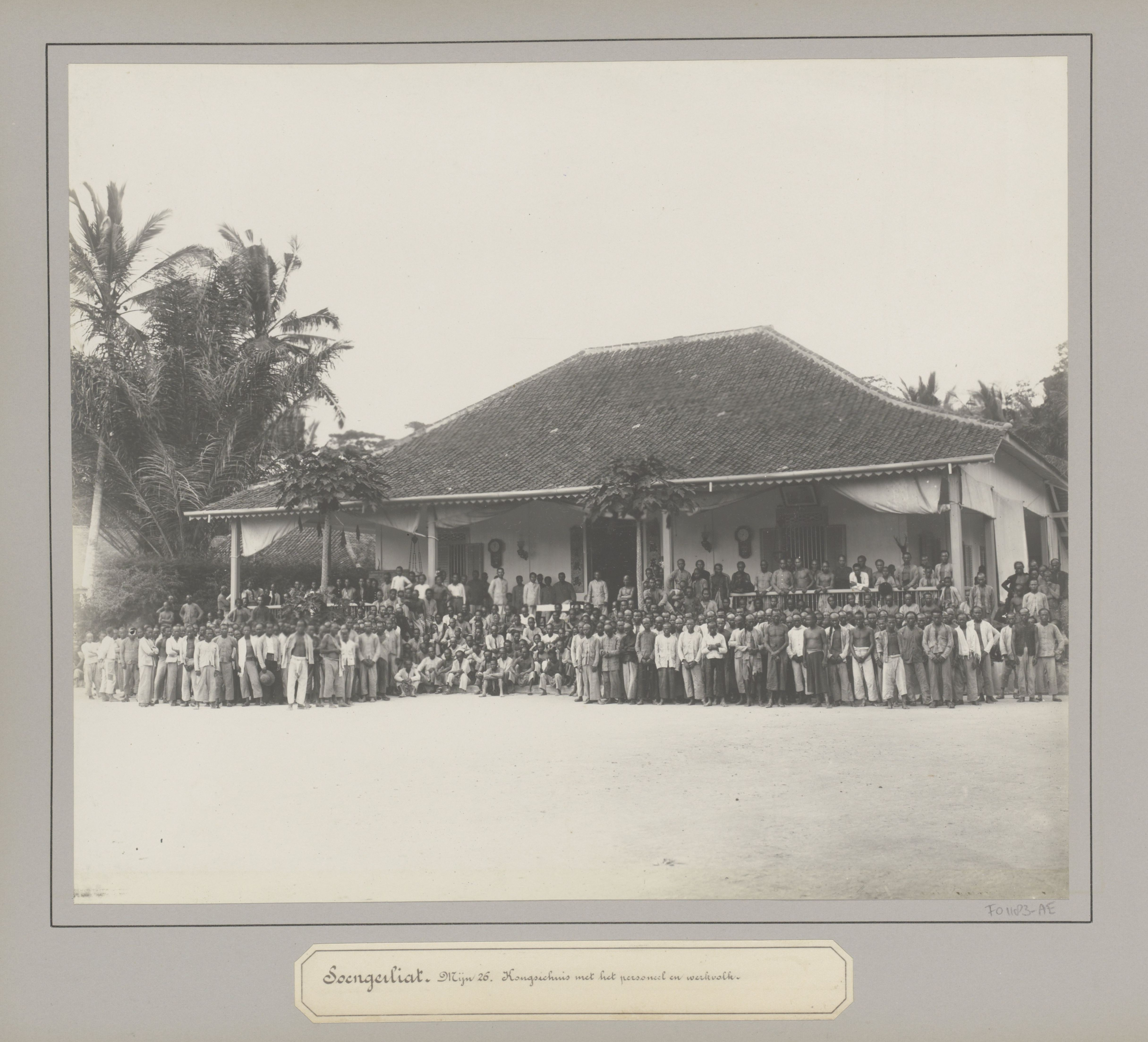
Meeting hall

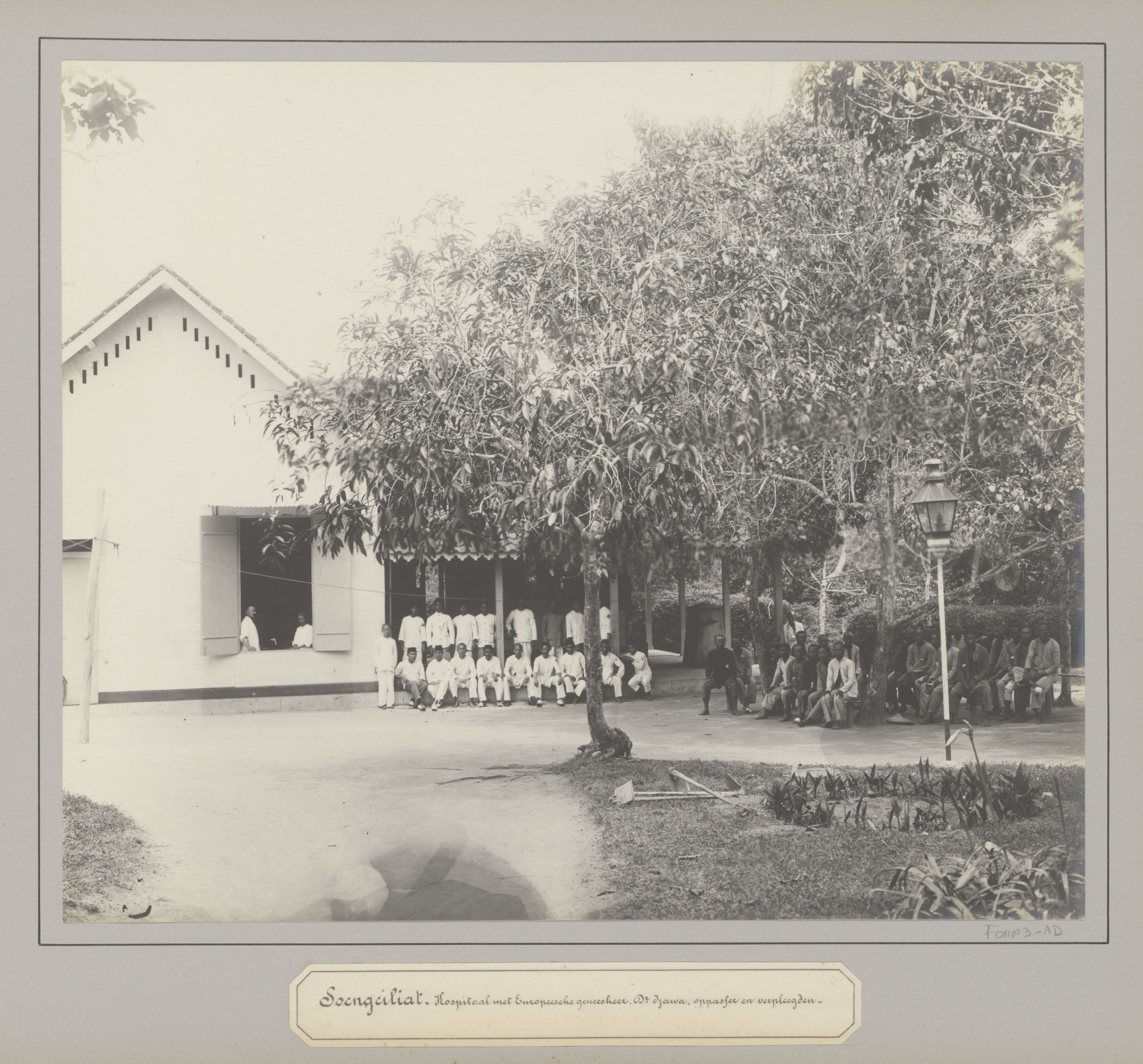
Hospital
