= Belitong F.C. =

Indonesian football club

Belitong
- Full name: Belitong Football Club
- Nickname: Laskar Satam
- Founded: 2011; 15 years ago
- Ground: Pangkallalang Stadium; Tanjung Pandan, Belitung
- Owner: Ridwan Oesman
- President: Yopi Perwiranusa
- Manager: Ramzy Okbah
- Coach: Ardiles Rumbiak
- League: Liga 3
- 2021–22: Liga 3, Round of 32 (National)
- Website: https://belitongfc.id/
Home colours	Away colours

Belitong Football Club (simply known as Belitong FC or BFC) is an Indonesian football club based in Tanjung Pandan, Belitung. They currently compete in the Liga 3.

== Honours ==
- Liga 3 Bangka Belitung Islands
  - Champion (1): 2021
