= Bangka Regency =

Regency in Bangka Belitung Islands, Indonesia

Bangka Regency Kabupaten Bangka
- Regency
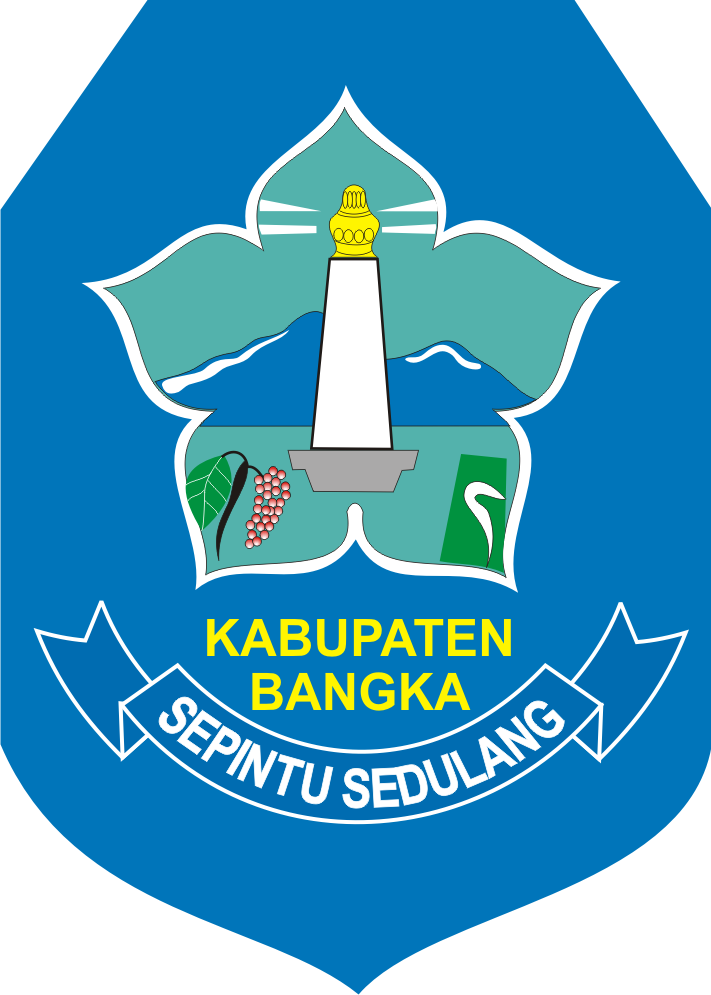
- Coat of arms
- Motto: Sepintu Sedulang
- Location within Bangka Belitung Islands

- Location in Sumatra and Indonesia Bangka Regency (Indonesia)
- Coordinates: 1°54′S 105°53′E
- Country: Indonesia
- Province: Bangka Belitung Islands
- Regency seat: Sungailiat

Government
  - Acting Regent: Jantani Ali
  - Vice Regent: Vacant

Area
  - Total: 3,016.85 km^{2} (1,164.81 sq mi)

Population (mid 2025 estimate)
  - Total: 341,760
  - Density: 113.28/km^{2} (293.40/sq mi)
- Time zone: UTC+7 (IWST)
- Area code: (+62) 717
- Website: bangka.go.id

Bangka Regency is a regency (kabupaten) of Bangka Belitung Islands Province in Indonesia. Originally the regency covered the whole of Bangka Island apart from the city of Pangkalpinang on the east coast, but on 25 February 2003 it was divided into four regencies, with three parts of Bangka Regency being split off to form the separate regencies of Bangka Barat, Bangka Selatan and Bangka Tengah. The residual regency now covers a land area of 3,016.85 km^{2} in the northeast of Bangka Island, and had a population of 277,204 at the 2010 Census rising to 326,265 at the 2020 Census; the official estimate as of mid 2025 was 341,760 (comprising 175,430 males and 166,330 females). The coastal town of Sungailiat is its regency headquarters.

== Administrative districts ==
The Regency as at 2022 was divided into eight districts (kecamatan), tabulated below with their areas and their populations at the 2010 Census and the 2020 Census, together with the official estimates as of mid 2025. The table also includes the location of the district administrative centres, the number of administrative villages (totaling 62 rural desa and 19 urban kelurahan) and the number of offshore islands in each district, and its postal codes.

However, a further three districts have recently been established - those of Karang Lintang, Maras Makmur and Simpang Tiga, although data concerning these have not yet been published.

Kode Wilayah	Name of District (kecamatan)	Area in km^{2}	Pop'n Census 2010	Pop'n Census 2020	Pop'n Estimate mid 2025	Admin centre	No. of villages	No. of islands	Post codes
19.01.04	Mendo Barat	685.64	42,290	51,133	53,240	Petaling Banjar	15	8	33173
19.01.03	Merawang	215.89	26,200	30,596	31,870	Batu Rusa	10	1	33172
19.01.08	Puding Besar	272.10	16,385	19,419	20,950	Puding Besar	7	-	33171
19.01.01	Sungai Liat	147.05	82,635	92,883	97,320	Sri Menanti	13 ^{(a)}	7	33211 - 33215
19.01.05	Pemali	140.46	24,985	34,705	36,360	Air Duren	5	-	33251 & 33255.
19.01.06	Bakam	426.26	16,667	19,039	19,730	Bakam	9	-	33252
19.01.02	Belinyu	503.54	44,401	50,200	52,040	Kuto Oanji	12 ^{(b)}	19	33253
19.01.07	Riau Silip	625.91	23,641	28,290	30,260	Riau	9	13	33254
	Totals	3,016.85	277,204	326,265	341,760	Sungailiat	81	48	

Notes: (a) comprising 12 kelurahan (Bukit Betung, Jelitik, Kenanga, Kudai, Lubuk Kelik, Matras, Parit Padang, Sinar Baru, Sinar Jaya Jelutung, Sri Menanti, Sungailiat and Surya Timur) and 1 desa (Rebo).
(b) comprising 7 kelurahan (Air Asam, Air Jukung, Belinyu, Bukit Ketok, Kuto Panji, Mantung and Remodong Indah) and 5 desa.

== Religion ==
In 2014 Bangka Regency had 247,316 Moslem, 31,710 Buddhism religion, 6,464 Protestantism, 5,845 Confusianism, 3,368 Catholicism, 2,326 other religions, 62 Hinduism and 16,995 persons are not identified/other.
