= Patricia Gouw =

Indonesian fashion model and presenter (born 1990)

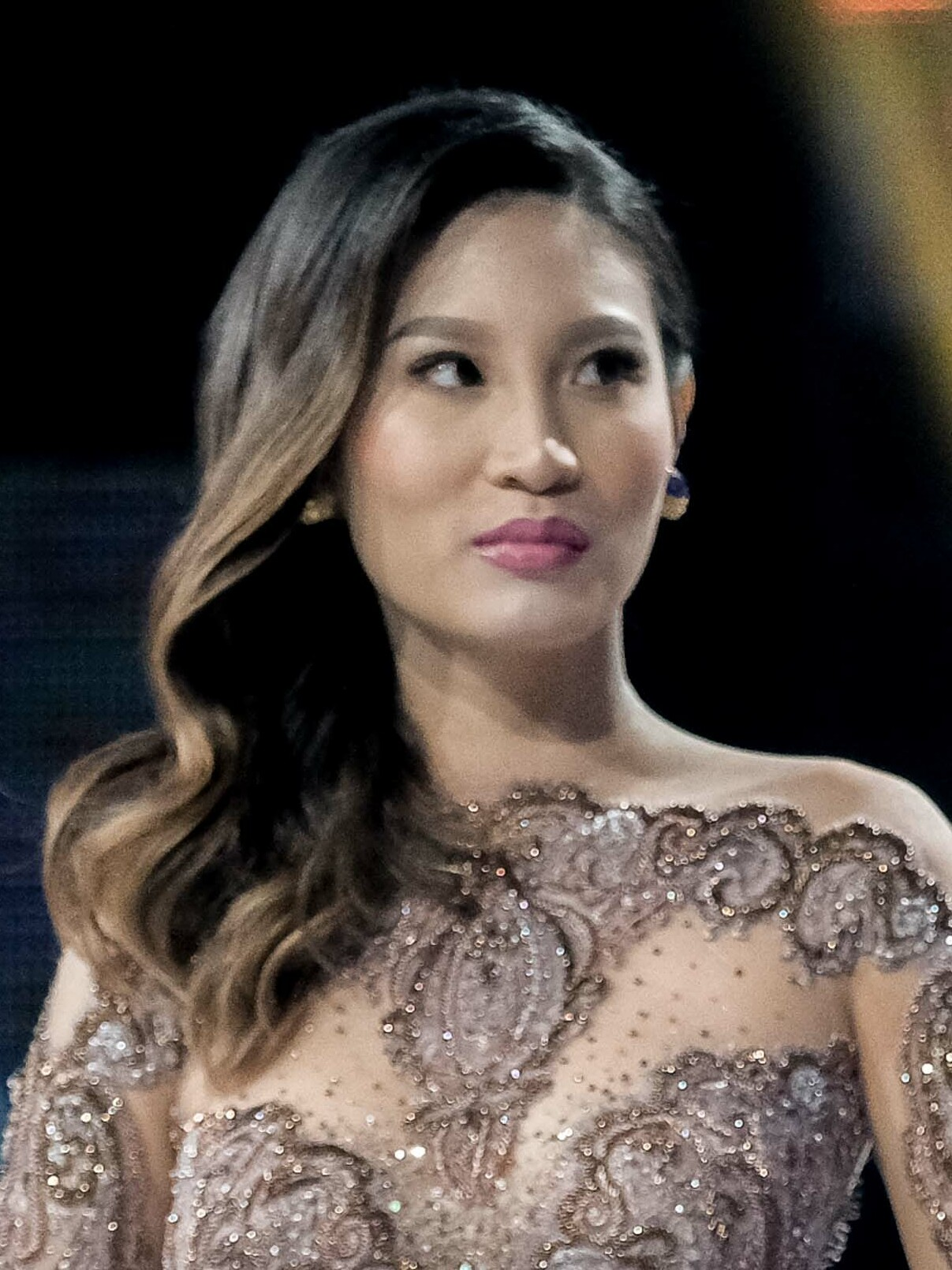
- Gouw in 2020
- Born: Patricia Gunawan; July 14, 1990 (age 36); Jakarta, Indonesia
- Other name: PatGouw
- Citizenship: Indonesia
- Education: LaSalle College, Indonesia
- Spouse: Daniel Bertoli (m. 2023)
- Children: 1
- Modeling information
- Height: 1.70 m (5 ft 7 in)
- Agency: WYNN Models Indonesia
- Beauty pageant titleholder
- Title: Miss Gorontalo 2012; Miss ASEAN Indonesia 2012
- Major competition: Miss Indonesia 2012 (Top 15) (Miss Healthy); Miss ASEAN 2012 (1st Runner-Up); Asia's Next Top Model season 4 (Runner-Up)

Patricia Gunawan (born July 14, 1990) is an Indonesian fashion model, television presenter, and beauty pageant titleholder. She was the runner-up of the fourth season of Asia's Next Top Model. Previously, she competed in the Miss Indonesia 2012 pageant, then Miss ASEAN 2012.

== Background and education ==
Patricia Gunawan was born on July 14, 1990, in Jakarta, Indonesia. She is the eldest of three siblings, born to Beddhi Gunawan and Shirley Winarso. Gouw is of Chinese Indonesian descent. Her family name, Gunawan, is a transliteration of the Chinese surname Wu (吳), which can be pronounced as Gouw. She graduated from LaSalle College, Indonesia with a degree in Fashion Business.

== Personal life ==
Gouw became engaged to investor Daniel Bertoli in June 2021 in Seychelles. The couple was officially married on February 6, 2023 in a ceremony held at Six Senses Uluwatu, Bali. In August 2024, Gouw gave birth to their daughter.

== Career ==
=== Pageantry ===
Gouw made her beauty pageant debut as the representative of Gorontalo at the Miss Indonesia 2012 pageant, held on 28 April 2012 at Hall D2 Jakarta International Expo, Jakarta. She was announced as one of the Top 15 semifinalists and was awarded the title of Miss Healthy. This marked the third time Gorontalo had placed in the competition, following Viena Victoria Mengko and Serenade Miolo in the second and third editions, respectively. The title was ultimately won by Ines Putri of Bali.

On 23 December 2012, Gouw independently competed in the Miss ASEAN 2012 pageant held in Chiang Rai, Thailand. She was named the first runner-up, with the title going to Dieu Han of Vietnam.

=== Asia's Next Top Model ===
In 2016, Gouw represented Indonesia in the fourth season of the modeling competition Asia's Next Top Model, alongside Aldilla Zahraa, who was eliminated in episode 6. Gouw emerged as the highest-scoring model in episodes 7, 8, and 12, ultimately achieving the highest cumulative score among all contestants. In the finale, she secured the runner-up position, surpassing Sang In from South Korea. The competition was won by Tawan Jiratchaya Kedkong from Thailand.

== Filmography ==
=== Web series ===
| Year | Title | Role | Note |
|---|---|---|---|
| 2023—2024 | Bestie 2 | Cathy | Debut |
| 2024 | Arab Maklum | Patricia | Season 2 |

=== Films ===
| Year | Title | Role | Note |
|---|---|---|---|
| 2025 | The Most Beautiful Girl in the World | Self | |
| 2025 | La Tahzan: Cinta, Dosa, Luka… † | Eva | |

Key
| † | Denotes films that have not yet been released |

Awards and achievements
| Preceded by (Philippines) Monika Sta. Maria | Runner-Up Asia's Next Top Model; 2016 (season 4) | Succeeded by (Vietnam) Nguyễn Minh Tú |
| Preceded by (Indonesia) Imelda Fransisca | 1st Runner-Up Miss ASEAN; 2012 | Succeeded by (Malaysia) Amelia Thripura Henderson |
| Preceded by Alyssa Anjani Akilie | Miss Gorontalo; 2012 | Succeeded by Grace Mastiur Marbun |
