= Miss Indonesia 2014 =

- Date: 17 February 2014
- Presenters: Robby Purba, Priscilla Febrita
- Entertainment: Judika, Citra Scholastika, Afgan Syahreza, Petra Sihombing
- Venue: Hall D2 Jakarta International Expo, Jakarta, Indonesia
- Broadcaster: RCTI, MNC Fashion
- Entrants: 34
- Placements: 15
- Debuts: North Kalimantan
- Winner: Maria Rahajeng; West Sulawesi
- Congeniality: Ellen Rachel Aragay; West Papua

Miss Indonesia 2014 is the tenth edition of the Miss Indonesia pageant. It was held on 17 February 2014 at Hall D2 Jakarta International Expo, Jakarta, Indonesia. Miss World 2013, Megan Young of Philippines attended the awarding night. Vania Larissa as Miss Indonesia 2013 from West Kalimantan crowned her successor, Maria Rahajeng from West Sulawesi. She represented Indonesia in Miss World 2014 in London, England and place in Top 25.

== Judges ==
- Liliana Tanoesoedibjo, Founder and Chairwoman of Miss Indonesia Organization.
- Ferry Salim, actor and UNICEF National Ambassador for Indonesia.
- Inesh Putri Tjiptadi Chandra, Miss Indonesia 2012.
- Wulan Tilaar Widarto, Vice Chairwoman of Martha Tilaar Group.
- Priyo Oktaviano, fashion designer.

== Results ==
| Final results | Contestant |
|---|---|
| Miss Indonesia 2014 | West Sulawesi - Maria Rahajeng |
| 1st runner-up | West Papua - Ellen Rachel Aragay |
| 2nd runner-up | East Java - Hanna Christiany Sugialam |
| Top 7 | Aceh - Shinta Alvionita A.S.; Central Java - Tatyana Almira Permadi; Lampung - Fadhila Hananing Estu; Yogyakarta Special Region - Bunga Syamsu Wirandani |
| Top 15 | Bangka-Belitung Islands - Olivia Pramaisella; Central Sulawesi - Indah Kusuma; Central Kalimantan - Bunga Ghassani; Gorontalo - Windy Dwi Apsari; Jakarta Special Capital Region - Olivia Belle Utomo; Maluku - Dewi Puspitasari; North Sumatra - Ruth Christine Laura Tobing; West Java - Siti Anida Lestari Qoryatin |

=== Fast Track Event ===
Fast track events held during preliminary round and the winners of Fast Track events are automatically qualified to enter the semifinal round. This year's fast track events include: Talent, Sport, Catwalk (Modelling), Beauty With a Purpose, and two new fast track challenge is Nature & Beauty and Multimedia.

| Fast Track | Contestant |
|---|---|
| Multimedia | Bangka-Belitung Islands - Olivia Pramaisella |
| Modelling | Gorontalo - Windy Dwi Apsari |
| Beauty & Nature | Aceh - Shinta Alvionita |
| Sports | Maluku - Dewi Puspitasari |
| Talent | North Sumatra - Ruth Christine Laura Tobing |
| Beauty with a Purpose | Central Sulawesi - Indah Kusuma |

=== Special Award ===
| Award | Contestant |
|---|---|
| ADVAN Miss Social Media | Bangka-Belitung Islands - Olivia Pramaisella |
| Sari Ayu Miss Beauty Skin | Jakarta Special Capital Region - Olivia Belle Utomo |
| Miss Online by Okezone | Riau - Jesslyn Anggasta Hardi |
| Miss Lifestyle by MNC Lifestyle | East Java - Hanna Sugialam |
| Miss Chatting by WeChat | West Java - Siti Anida Lestari Qoryatin |
| Miss Congeniality | West Papua - Ellen Rachel Aragay |
| Miss Favorite | West Kalimantan - Diana Jo Rachmatien |

== Audition of Miss Indonesia 2014 ==
=== Audition Schedule ===
- Surabaya: October 20, 2013
- Makassar: October 27, 2013
- Bandung: November 23–24, 2013
- Jakarta: November 10 & December 14–15, 2013

== Contestants ==
| Province | Delegate | Age | Height |
|---|---|---|---|
| Aceh | Shinta Alvionita A.S. | 23 | 1.68 m (5 ft 6 in) |
| Bali | Visca Zerlinda Hatiti | 21 | 1.73 m (5 ft 8 in) |
| Bangka-Belitung Islands | Olivia Pramaisella | 18 | 1.68 m (5 ft 6 in) |
| Banten | Vania Rizky Amanda | 19 | 1.73 m (5 ft 8 in) |
| Bengkulu | Reksipesi Zekiazhi | 20 | 1.67 m (5 ft 5 1/2 in) |
| Central Java | Tatyana Almira Permadi | 18 | 1.70 m (5 ft 7 in) |
| Central Kalimantan | Bunga Ghassani | 18 | 1.70 m (5 ft 7 in) |
| Central Sulawesi | Indah Kusuma | 19 | 1.67 m (5 ft 5 1/2 in) |
| East Java | Hanna Christiany Sugialam | 21 | 1.73 m (5 ft 8 in) |
| East Kalimantan | Puty Revita | 21 | 1.70 m (5 ft 7 in) |
| East Nusa Tenggara | Astriana Marsalince Asbanu | 23 | 1.73 m (5 ft 8 in) |
| Gorontalo | Windy Dwi Apsari | 23 | 1.72 m (5 ft 7 1/2 in) |
| Jakarta Special Capital Region | Olivia Belle Utomo | 22 | 1.72 m (5 ft 7 1/2 in) |
| Jambi | Rhea Diva Carissa | 19 | 1.66 m (5 ft 5 1/2 in) |
| Lampung | Fadhila Hananing Estu | 18 | 1.68 m (5 ft 6 in) |
| Maluku | Dewi Puspitasari | 20 | 1.70 m (5 ft 7 in) |
| North Kalimantan | Hallira Haddad | 20 | 1.65 m (5 ft 5 in) |
| North Maluku | Eudia Isabelle | 17 | 1.73 m (5 ft 8 in) |
| North Sulawesi | Robertha Erly Shandy Ratio | 18 | 1.68 m (5 ft 6 in) |
| North Sumatra | Ruth Christine Laura Tobing | 19 | 1.70 m (5 ft 7 in) |
| Papua | Cezia Greatia Pesurnay | 22 | 1.67 m (5 ft 5 1/2 in) |
| Riau | Jesslyn Anggasta Hardi | 18 | 1.73 m (5 ft 8 in) |
| Riau Islands | Claudia Henyka | 20 | 1.77 m (5 ft 9 1/2 in) |
| South Kalimantan | Florence Dannies | 18 | 1.67 m (5 ft 5 1/2 in) |
| South Sulawesi | Indira Trimurti | 20 | 1.72 m (5 ft 7 1/2 in) |
| South Sumatra | Jesica Harianto | 19 | 1.67 m (5 ft 5 1/2 in) |
| Southeast Sulawesi | Lici Meiranti Rifai | 19 | 1.72 m (5 ft 7 1/2 in) |
| West Java | Siti Anida Lestari Qoryatin | 22 | 1.70 m (5 ft 7 in) |
| West Kalimantan | Diana Jo Rachmatien | 18 | 1.71 m (5 ft 7 1/2 in) |
| West Nusa Tenggara | Ni Wayan Suari Ariq | 20 | 1.74 m (5 ft 8 1/2 in) |
| West Papua | Ellen Rachel Aragay | 20 | 1.67 m (5 ft 5 1/2 in) |
| West Sulawesi | Maria Rahajeng | 22 | 1.68 m (5 ft 6 in) |
| West Sumatra | Najla Anissa | 19 | 1.69 m (5 ft 6 1/2 in) |
| Yogyakarta Special Region | Bunga Syamsu Wirandani | 21 | 1.70 m (5 ft 7 in) |

== Other pageant notes ==
East Java

=== Notes ===
- West Sulawesi won for the first time.

=== Designations ===
- Bali: Visca Zerlinda Hatiti was 1st runner-up of Puteri Indonesia Bali 2012, where the contest was won by Cok Istri Krisnanda Widani who was also 2nd Runner-up Puteri Indonesia 2013 or Puteri Indonesia Pariwisata 2013
- Jakarta Special Capital Region: Olivia Belle Utomo was won Singing Competition in the High School and first winning English Speech Contest and Indonesia Speech. She was the ambassador of HighEnd Teen Magazine at 2010.
- Gorontalo: Windy Dwi Apsari was Miss Hotrod or Ambassador of XL Axiata company, She also a model.
- West Java: Siti Anida Lestari Qoryatin was a national badminton player who has been in national team for couple of years, she competed in BWF World Junior Championships 2 times in 2008 and 2009 with the result lost in Round 3 in 2008 and Quarter Final in 2009 both in women's singles discipline.
- West Sulawesi: Maria Asteria Sastrayu Rahajeng after being crowned as Miss Indonesia, she criticized the current representation in connection with the contest area. It is said that Maria was not the people of West Sulawesi. She is born in Blora and since childhood, he settled in United States and Bali and had never set foot or has blood of West Sulawesi. Maria initially will represent Bali in the selection of Miss Indonesia. But because there has been a representative of Bali, by the organizers of Miss Indonesia, suggested that Maria represents West Sulawesi alone because there is no representative of West Sulawesi elected, so that she eventually competed representing West Sulawesi province. But Maria already accepted by the Governor of West Sulawesi as represented contestants.

=== Crossovers ===
Contestants who previously competed or will compete at other national beauty pageants:

Puteri Indonesia

- 2008: Aceh: Shinta Alvionita As
- 2013: Papua: Cezia Greatia Pesurnay (Top 3 Puteri Indonesia Berbakat/Miss Talent)

Putri Pariwisata Indonesia

- 2012: West Papua : Ellen Rachel Aragay (Top 10 & Putri Pariwisata Photogenic)

GADIS Sampul

- 2011: Bangka-Belitung Islands: Olivia Pramaisella (Favorite Contestant choose by audience GADIS Sampul 2011)

GoGirl! Look

- 2011 : Bangka-Belitung Islands: Olivia Pramaisella (Semifinalist)
- 2012 :Banten: Vania Rizky Amanda (TOP 20)
- 2012 : Gorontalo: Windy Dwi Hapsari (Semifinalist)

Top Model Indonesia YAPMI

- 2013 : Bengkulu: Reksipesi Zekiazhi
