= Miss Indonesia 2011 =

- Date: June 3, 2011
- Presenters: Sandra Angelia, Ferdi Hasan
- Entertainment: Ungu, J-Rocks, Andien, Petra Sihombing, Elicohen Christelgo Pentury, Felocity
- Venue: Central Park, Jakarta
- Broadcaster: RCTI
- Entrants: 33
- Placements: 10
- Winner: Astrid Ellena Indriana Yunadi; East Java
- Miss Congeniality: Johanna Sharon (Papua)
- Miss Sporty: Madhina Nur Muthia (Central Kalimantan)
- Miss Lifestyle: Nadya Siddiqa (Banten)
- Miss Favorite: Astrid Ellena Indriana Yunadi (East Java)

Miss Indonesia 2011 is the seventh edition of Miss Indonesia beauty pageant. It features the theme of Ragam Cantik Indonesia (Indonesian: Variety of Indonesian beauty). The pageant was held at Central Park, Jakarta on June 3, 2011 and was hosted by Ferdie Hasan and Sandra Angelia. The current titleholder of Miss World, Alexandria Mills attended the awarding night, when Asyifa Latief of West Java crowned her successor, Astrid Ellena Indriana Yunadi from East Java.

== Results ==
=== Placements ===
Placement	Contestant
Miss Indonesia 2011	East Java - Astrid Ellena Indriana Yunadi
1st Runner-up	West Papua - Amanda Roberta Zevannya
2nd Runner-up	Banten - Nadya Siddiqa
Top 5	Central Kalimantan - Madhina Nur Muthia; Jakarta Special Capital Region - Fatya Ginanjarsari
Top 10	Bali - Putu Tri Bulan Utami; Bangka-Belitung Islands - Eviliana; West Java - Nita Sofiani; West Kalimantan - Kayla Natalia Haman; Special Region of Yogyakarta - Merah Putri

=== Fast track winners ===
Fast track events are held during preliminary round and the winners of Fast Track events are automatically qualified to enter the semifinal round. This year's fast track events include: talent, sport, and modeling.

- Bangka-Belitung Islands - Eviliana (Talent)
- Central Kalimantan - Madhina Nur Muthia (Sport)
- West Kalimantan - Kayla Natalia Haman (Modelling)

=== Special awards ===
Award	Contestant
Miss Congeniality	Papua - Johanna Sharon C.
Miss Favorite	East Java - Astrid Ellena Indriana Yunadi
Miss Beautiful Skin	East Java - Astrid Ellena Indriana Yunadi
Miss Best Body	Bali - Putu Tri Bulan Utami
Miss Lifestyle	Banten - Nadya Siddiqa
Miss Sporty	Central Kalimantan - Madhina Nur Muthia

== Judges ==
- Liliana Tanoesoedibjo
- Martha Tilaar
- Harry Darsono
- Tantowi Yahya
- Ferry Salim

== Contestants ==
A total of 33 contestants representing all 33 provinces of Indonesia competed during the pageant. They were selected through an audition in six cities across the country, i.e.: Yogyakarta, Denpasar, Surabaya, Bandung, Makassar, and Jakarta.

Province	Contestant	Age	Height
Aceh	Mellyza Shavira	17	1.67 m (5 ft 5 1/2 in)
Bali	Putu Tri Bulan Utami	17	1.72 m (5 ft 7 1/2 in)
Bangka-Belitung Islands	Eviliana	21	1.79 m (5 ft 10 1/2 in)
Banten	Nadya Siddiqa	21	1.65 m (5 ft 5 in)
Bengkulu	Veny Desi Arti	19	1.66 m (5 ft 5 1/2 in)
Central Java	Asti Lukita Wardani	22	1.71 m (5 ft 7 1/2 in)
Central Kalimantan	Madhina Nur Muthia	17	1.65 m (5 ft 5 in)
Central Sulawesi	Yohana Yeremia O.	24	1.65 m (5 ft 5 in)
East Java	Astrid Ellena Indriana Yunadi	20	1.71 m (5 ft 7 1/2 in)
East Kalimantan	Afina Dewi Maraya	19	1.66 m (5 ft 5 1/2 in)
East Nusa Tenggara	Dikna Faradiba Maharani	17	1.64 m (5 ft 4 1/2 in)
Gorontalo	Alyssa Anjani Akilie	19	1.74 m (5 ft 8 1/2 in)
Jakarta SCR	Fatya Ginanjarsari	17	1.76 m (5 ft 9 1/2 in)
Jambi	Nety Riana Sari S.N.	23	1.70 m (5 ft 7 in)
Lampung	Mira Damayanti	23	1.70 m (5 ft 7 in)
Maluku	Ingrid Beatrix Salampessy	21	1.68 m (5 ft 6 in)
North Maluku	Risky Cyndy Yunita Ramlan	19	1.69 m (5 ft 6 1/2 in)
North Sulawesi	Lidia Stephanie Thendeano	18	1.71 m (5 ft 7 1/2 in)
North Sumatra	Liza Lestari Ginting	21	1.66 m (5 ft 5 1/2 in)
Papua	Johanna Sharon C.	23	1.70 m (5 ft 7 in)
Riau	Nurul Chintya Irada	20	1.67 m (5 ft 5 1/2 in)
Riau Islands	Astari Aslam	19	1.73 m (5 ft 8 in)
South Kalimantan	Aprillya Elshaviona	18	1.71 m (5 ft 7 1/2 in)
South Sulawesi	Gadis Chairunnisa	19	1.67 m (5 ft 5 1/2 in)
South Sumatra	Maya Alia	18	1.76 m (5 ft 9 1/2 in)
Southeast Sulawesi	Ananti Trisa Putri	22	1.68 m (5 ft 6 in)
West Java	Nita Sofiani	18	1.70 m (5 ft 7 in)
West Kalimantan	Kayla Natalia Haman	23	1.67 m (5 ft 5 1/2 in)
West Nusa Tenggara	Ni Made Aripiasari	21	1.67 m (5 ft 5 1/2 in)
West Papua	Amanda Roberta Zevannya	19	1.72 m (5 ft 7 1/2 in)
West Sulawesi	Farasta Der Noesoer	20	1.65 m (5 ft 5 in)
West Sumatra	Wira Wiguna	19	1.68 m (5 ft 6 in)
Yogyakarta, Special Region of	Merah Putri	19	1.67 m (5 ft 5 1/2 in)

== Crossovers ==
Miss Indonesia Earth

- 2013 : West Java - Nita Sofiani (winner)
- 2014: East Nusa Tenggara - Dikna Faradiba Maharani (Top 10)

Puteri Indonesia

- 2017 : Jakarta SCR - Fatya Ginanjarsari (unplaced)
  ~represented North Kalimantan
- 2017 : Riau Islands - Astari Aslam (unplaced)
  ~represented Riau
