= Kamidia Radisti =

Indonesian actress and model (born 1984)

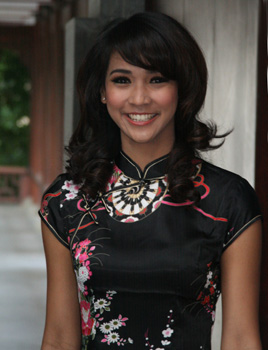
- Kamidia Radisti in Miss World
- Born: Kamidia Radisti; 23 February 1984 (age 42); Surabaya, East Java, Indonesia
- Height: 1.71 m (5 ft 7 in)
- Spouse: Lutfi Ubaidillah (m. 2009)
- Children: 3
- Beauty pageant titleholder
- Title: Miss Indonesia 2007; Miss World Indonesia 2007
- Years active: 2007 - Now
- Hair color: Black
- Eye color: Brown
- Major competitions: Miss Indonesia 2007; (Winner); Miss World 2007; (Unplaced)

Kamidia Radisti (born in Surabaya, East Java, 23 February 1984) is an Indonesian former swimming athlete, actress, model, presenter, and beauty pageant titleholder who won the title of Miss Indonesia in 2007.

== Early life ==
Born in Surabaya on 23 February 1984, Disty earned a bachelor's degree in economics from Padjadjaran University, West Java.

Before entering the entertainment industry, she was a competitive swimmer and later worked as a swimming coach.

== Pageantry ==
=== Miss Indonesia 2007 ===
Disty represented West Java and competed against 32 other finalists at Miss Indonesia 2007. At the final night held in Jakarta International Convention Center, she won the 2nd title of Miss Indonesia for West Java after Imelda Fransisca's victory in 2005.

=== Miss World 2007 ===
As the winner of Miss Indonesia 2007, Disty represented Indonesia at Miss World 2007, held in Sanya, China, where Zhang Zilin of China won the title. Although she did not advance to the semifinals, she was among the finalists in several fast-track events, finishing in the Top 20 of Miss World Sports, Top 15 of Miss World Talent, and Top 5 of Beauty with a Purpose.

== Life after Miss World ==
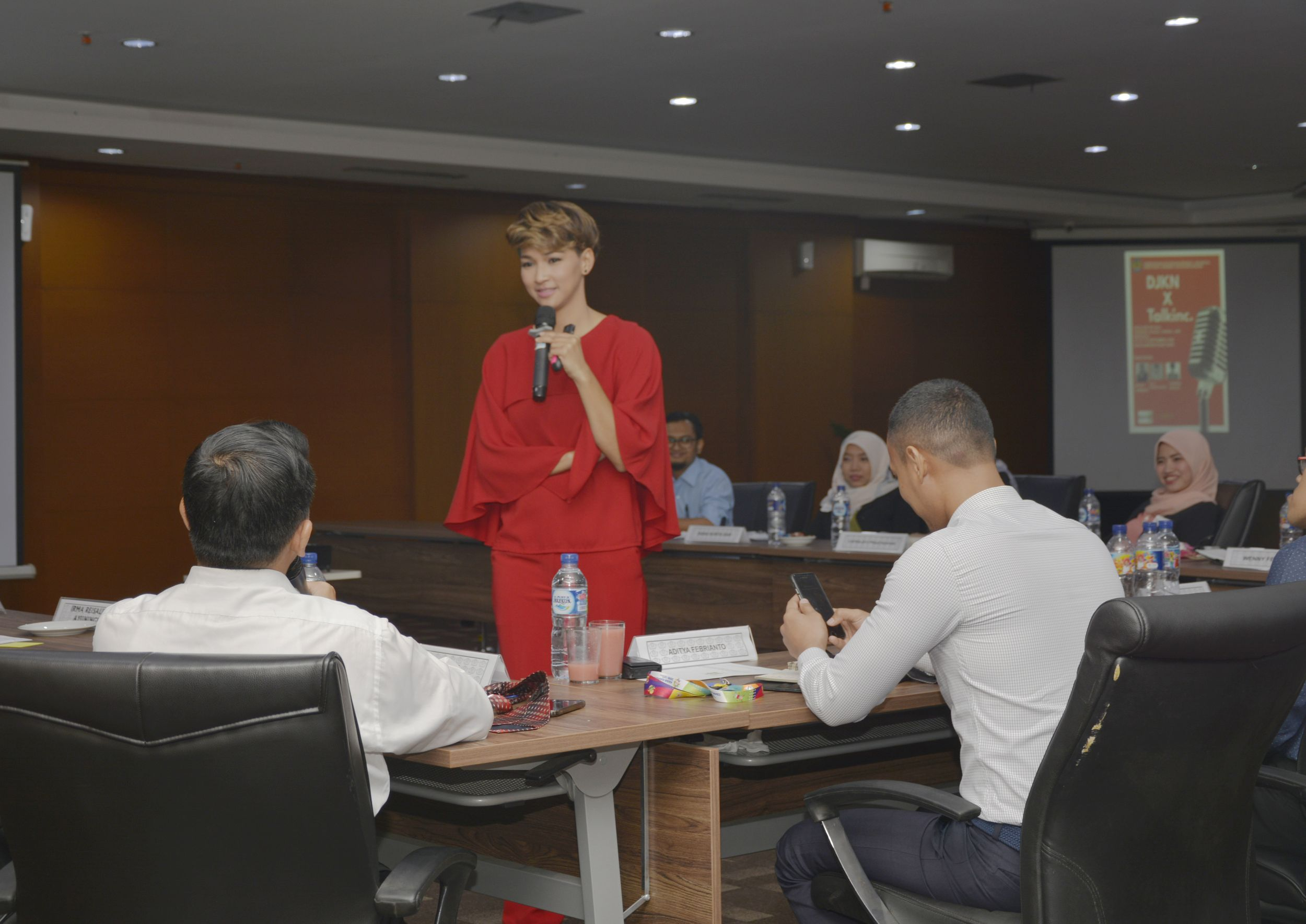
Radisti on September 2018.

After relinquishing the Miss Indonesia title to her successor, Sandra Angelia, in May 2008, Radisti pursued a career in the entertainment industry as a television presenter, hosting several national television programs.

She made her film debut in the horror film The Shaman (2008), before appearing in Hantu Biang Kerok (2009).

== Personal life ==
Radisti married entrepreneur Lutfi Ubaidillah on 5 April 2009. The couple have three children.

Following her marriage, Radisti gradually reduced her activities in the entertainment industry to focus on raising her family while continuing to make occasional appearances on television and at public events. She has also remained involved in sports and lifestyle-related activities, reflecting her background as a former competitive swimmer.

== Filmography ==
Film
| Year | Title | Role | Note |
|---|---|---|---|
| 2008 | The Shaman | Santi | Debut |
| 2009 | Hantu Biang Kerok | Ocha | |
| 2011 | The Tarix Jabrix 3 | Mayang | |
| 2013 | Sang Pialang | Analea | |

Television
| Show | TV Station |
|---|---|
| Go Spot | RCTI |
| Insert | Trans TV |
| Sport 7/Sport 7 Malam | Trans 7 |
| Galeri Sepak Bola Indonesia | Trans 7 |
| Gila Makan | Trans 7 |
| Modern Moms | Trans 7 |
| inLine | Trans 7 |
| Xtra Seleb | RTV |
| Hi! Doctor | Usee TV |
| A Day With | Kompas TV |

Awards and achievements
| Preceded by Kristania Virginia Besouw | Miss Indonesia; 2007 | Succeeded by Sandra Angelia |
