= Miss Indonesia 2019 =

Indonesian beauty pageant

- Date: February 15, 2019
- Presenters: Robby Purba, Daniel Mananta, Amanda Zevannya
- Entertainment: Judika, Siti Badriah, Brisia Jodie, Arsy Widianto
- Venue: MNC Studio, Kebon Jeruk, Jakarta, Indonesia
- Broadcaster: RCTI
- Entrants: 34
- Placements: 15
- Winner: Princess Mikhaelia Audrey Megonondo; Jambi
- Congeniality: Ni Putu Junita Pratiwi; Bali

Miss Indonesia 2019, the 15th edition of the Miss Indonesia pageant was held on February 15, 2019, at MNC Studio, Kebon Jeruk, Jakarta, Indonesia. Miss World 2018, Vanessa Ponce of Mexico attended the awarding night. Alya Nurshabrina as Miss Indonesia 2018 from West Java crowned her successor, Princess Mikhaelia Audrey Megonondo from Jambi. She will represent Indonesia on Miss World 2019.

== Judges ==
Judges of Miss Indonesia 2019 Pageant

- Liliana Tanoesoedibjo, founder and chairwoman of Miss Indonesia Organization.
- Peter F. Saerang, professional make-up and hairstylist.
- Ferry Salim, actor, entrepreneur, and ambassador of UNICEF to Indonesia.
- Maria Harfanti, Miss Indonesia 2015, 2nd-Runner-up Miss World 2015, Miss World Asia 2015.
- Natasha Mannuela, Miss Indonesia 2016, 2nd-Runner-up Miss World 2016, Miss World Asia 2016.

== Result ==
=== Placements ===
| Result | Contestant |
|---|---|
| Miss Indonesia 2019 | Jambi - Princess Mikhaelia Audrey Megonondo |
| 1st Runner-up | Banten - Elisa Jonathan |
| 2nd Runner-up | North Sulawesi - Sharon Margriet Sumolang |
| 3rd Runner-up | East Java - Tamara Dewi Gondo |
| 4th Runner-up | East Nusa Tenggara - Magdalena Rosari Ndona |
| 5th Runner-up | Maluku - Yolanda Lucia Tuasela § |
| 6th Runner-up | West Sulawesi - Vebbiantri Hananto § |
| Top 15 semifinalist | North Sumatra - Paska Denberia Pakpahan §; West Sumatra - Annisa Cynthia §; Bangka Belitung Islands - Natasha Lyotania; Yogyakarta Special Region - Puspita Yosephine; West Kalimantan - Beisca Azzahra Siregar; Central Sulawesi - Cindy Monika Agatha §; Gorontalo - Jessica Novalia §; Papua - Marchellia Lunggaer |

==== Order Announcements ====
===== Top 15 =====
1. Maluku §
2. Central Sulawesi §
3. West Sulawesi §
4. West Sumatra §
5. North Sumatra §
6. Gorontalo §
7. Banten
8. East Java
9. Yogyakarta Special Region
10. Papua
11. West Kalimantan
12. Jambi
13. Bangka Belitung Islands
14. East Nusa Tenggara
15. North Sulawesi

§ Placed into the Top 15 by Fast Track

===== Top 7 =====
1. Maluku
2. East Java
3. North Sulawesi
4. Jambi
5. Banten
6. East Nusa Tenggara
7. West Sulawesi

=== Fast Track Event ===
Fast track events held during preliminary round and the winners of Fast Track events are automatically qualified to enter the semifinal round. This year's fast track events include : Talent, Catwalk (Modeling), Sports, Nature and Beauty Fashion, Social Media, And Beauty with a Purpose.

| Category | Contestant |
|---|---|
| Sports | Maluku - Yolanda Luciana Tuasela |
| Nature and Beauty Fashion | West Sulawesi - Vebrianti Hananto |
| Social Media | Central Sulawesi - Cindy Monika Agatha |
| Catwalk (TOP Model) | West Sumatra - Annisa Chynthia Putri |
| Beauty With A Purpose (BWAP) | North Sumatra - Paska Denberia Pakpahan |
| Talent | Gorontalo - Jessica Novalia |

=== Special Awards ===
Special Awards include 3 Category :

| Award | Contestant |
|---|---|
| Miss Congeniality | Bali - Ni Putu Junita Pratiwi |
| Miss Favorite | Jakarta Special Capital Region - Aurelia Jafien |
| Miss Healthy Beauty Skin | Banten - Elisa Jonathan |

== Contestants ==
Contestants of Miss Indonesia 2019 from 34 Provinces in Indonesia.

| Province | Delegate | Age | Height | Hometown |
|---|---|---|---|---|
| Aceh | Amira Kun Nadia | 22 | 1.70 m (5 ft 7 in) | Banda Aceh |
| North Sumatra | Paska Denberia Pakpahan | 20 | 1.70 m (5 ft 7 in) | Medan |
| West Sumatra | Annisa Cynthia | 19 | 1.70 m (5 ft 7 in) | Padang |
| Riau | Nexia Tenar | 20 | 1.72 m (5 ft 8 in) | Pekanbaru |
| Riau Islands | Michelle Judith | 20 | 1.67 m (5 ft 6 in) | Batam |
| Jambi | Princess Mikhaelia Audrey Megonondo | 18 | 1.75 m (5 ft 9 in) | Jambi |
| South Sumatra | Reyra Dewanti Kumala Raden | 19 | 1.78 m (5 ft 10 in) | Ogan Komering Ilir |
| Bangka Belitung Islands | Natasha Lyotania | 21 | 1.70 m (5 ft 7 in) | Belitung |
| Bengkulu | Putri Dwi Sawitri | 22 | 1.72 m (5 ft 8 in) | Bengkulu |
| Lampung | Frinca Evangeline Anggilla | 18 | 1.73 m (5 ft 8 in) | Bandar Lampung |
| Jakarta Special Capital Region | Aurelia Jafien | 18 | 1.73 m (5 ft 8 in) | Jakarta |
| Banten | Elisa Jonathan | 20 | 1.67 m (5 ft 6 in) | Tangerang |
| West Java | Annastasya Widjaja | 17 | 1.67 m (5 ft 6 in) | Bandung |
| Central Java | Galih Nibras Sabrina | 22 | 1.70 m (5 ft 7 in) | Semarang |
| Yogyakarta Special Region | Puspita Yosephine | 19 | 1.67 m (5 ft 6 in) | Yogyakarta |
| East Java | Tamara Dewi Gondo | 21 | 1.71 m (5 ft 7 in) | Surabaya |
| Bali | Ni Putu Junita Pratiwi | 20 | 1.70 m (5 ft 7 in) | Denpasar |
| West Nusa Tenggara | Nisrina Rahmanita | 20 | 1.68 m (5 ft 6 in) | Mataram |
| East Nusa Tenggara | Magdalena Rosari Ndona | 19 | 1.70 m (5 ft 7 in) | Maumere |
| West Kalimantan | Beisca Azzahra Siregar | 19 | 1.72 m (5 ft 8 in) | Pontianak |
| South Kalimantan | Kesia Gunawan | 22 | 1.70 m (5 ft 7 in) | Banjarmasin |
| Central Kalimantan | Shieren Nathania | 22 | 1.69 m (5 ft 7 in) | Palangka Raya |
| East Kalimantan | Elizabeth Goldi | 18 | 1.70 m (5 ft 7 in) | Balikpapan |
| North Kalimantan | Evelyn Teagan | 20 | 1.73 m (5 ft 8 in) | Tarakan |
| South Sulawesi | Andriana Novianti Andiarumpang | 19 | 1.67 m (5 ft 6 in) | Makassar |
| West Sulawesi | Vebbiantri Hananto | 22 | 1.74 m (5 ft 9 in) | Mamuju |
| Southeast Sulawesi | Gabriella Mercy | 21 | 1.68 m (5 ft 6 in) | Kendari |
| Central Sulawesi | Cindy Monika Agatha | 19 | 1.68 m (5 ft 6 in) | Palu |
| North Sulawesi | Sharon Margriet Sumolang | 20 | 1.70 m (5 ft 7 in) | Manado |
| Gorontalo | Jessica Novalia | 18 | 1.70 m (5 ft 7 in) | Gorontao |
| Maluku | Yolanda Lucia Tuasela | 21 | 1.68 m (5 ft 6 in) | Ambon |
| North Maluku | Stefania Christina | 18 | 1.67 m (5 ft 6 in) | Ternate |
| West Papua | Vanessa Zahra | 20 | 1.68 m (5 ft 6 in) | Manokwari |
| Papua | Marchellia Lunggaer | 22 | 1.67 m (5 ft 6 in) | Jayapura |
