= Miss Indonesia 2005 =

- Date: 2005
- Venue: Balai Sarbini, Jakarta
- Broadcaster: RCTI
- Entrants: 32
- Placements: 9
- Winner: Imelda Fransisca; West Java

Miss Indonesia 2005 was the first Miss Indonesia contest. The final night was held on Balai Sarbini, Jakarta. This contest is won by Imelda Fransisca (West Java). She had represented Indonesia in Miss ASEAN 2005.
