= Princess Megonondo =

Indonesian model and beauty pageant titleholder

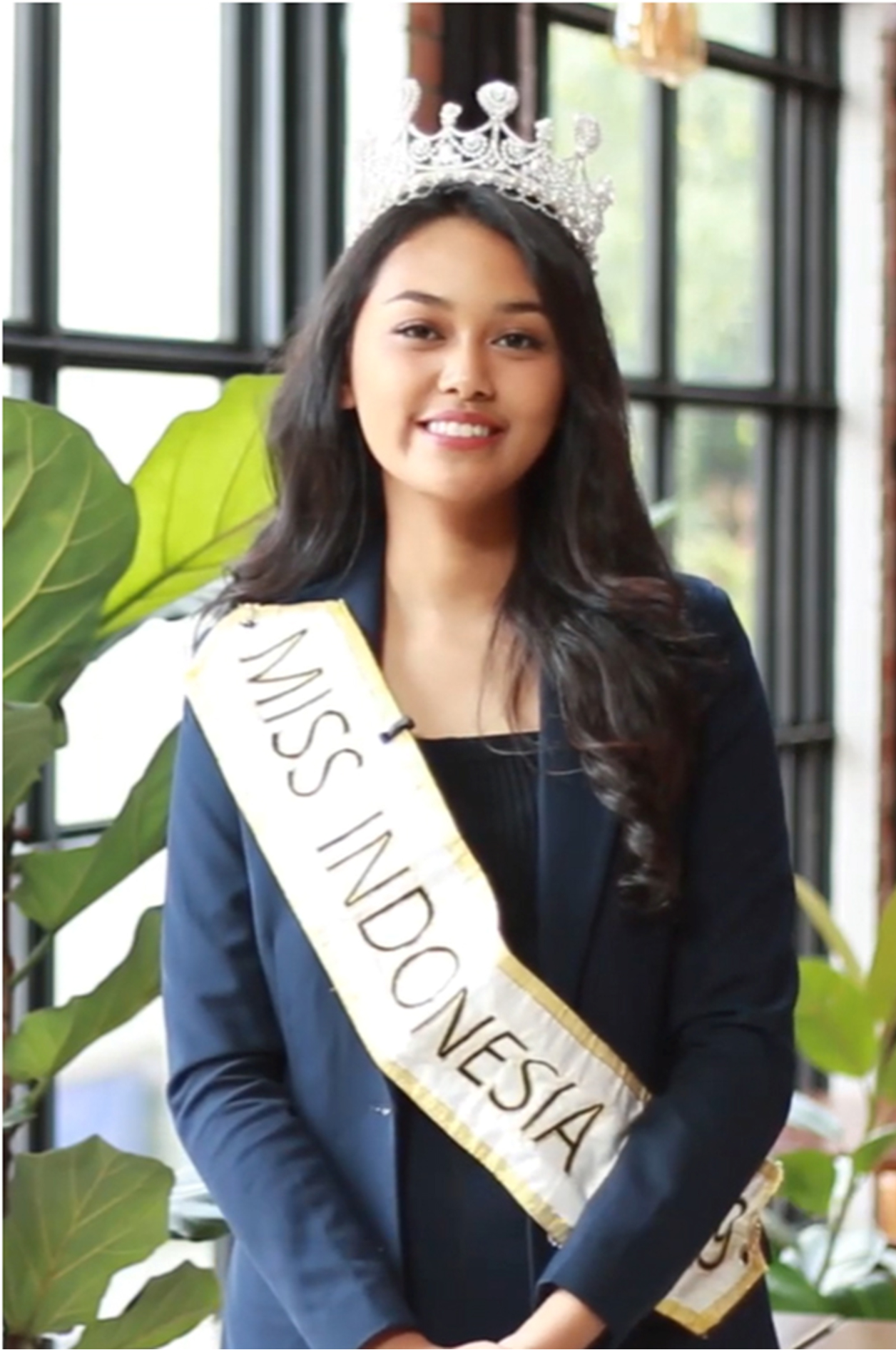
- Megonondo as Miss Indonesia 2019
- Born: Princess Mikhaelia Audrey Megonondo; 30 August 2000 (age 26); Jambi City, Jambi, Indonesia
- Education: SMA Harapan Bangsa
- Alma mater: Bina Nusantara University
- Occupations: Model; beauty pageant titleholder
- Height: 5 ft 9 in (1.75 m)
- Beauty pageant titleholder
- Title: Miss Indonesia 2019
- Hair color: Black
- Eye color: Brown
- Major competitions: Miss Indonesia 2019; (Winner); Miss World 2019; (Top 40)

Princess Mikhaelia Audrey Megonondo (Indonesian: [meg'o'nond'o']; born 30 August 2000) is an Indonesian commercial model and a beauty pageant titleholder who won Miss Indonesia 2019 on 15 February 2019. She represented Indonesia at the Miss World 2019 pageant on 14 December 2019, held at ExCeL London, UK, where she was placed in the top 40.

== Early life and education ==
Megonondo was born in Jambi on 30 August 2000, as Princess Mikhaelia Audrey Megonondo, to a Javanese-born mother, and her father came from Jambi, Sumatra. She represented Jambi Province at Miss Indonesia 2019. In an interview on the final night with host Daniel Mananta, her mother said that she wanted to be a princess since she was child who could inspire the younger generation, especially women. Megonondo is the first child of two brothers, she is currently studying at Bina Nusantara University majoring in international business management. She also works as a commercial model for magazines and TV commercials since she was eight years old.

When she was in high school at Harapan Bangsa School, Megonondo joined the "Walk-A-Thon", which raised funds for orphanages. She also volunteered at the Sahabat Peduli Indonesia, that taught art and recycled garbage around Ngurbloat Beach, Maluku Tenggara and Jambi in 2016.

Megonondo speaks English, Mandarin, and French, in addition to her mother language Bahasa Indonesia. She won the School English Debate Competition in 2015–2017.

== Pageantry ==
=== Miss Indonesia 2019 ===
Megonondo represented Jambi province at Miss Indonesia 2019, winning against finalists from 33 provinces. Answering questions from chairman of the Jury Liliana Tanaja Tanoesoedibjo she was asked what could be done to maximize the profits obtained as Miss Indonesia. Megonondo replied:

If I am to be chosen as Miss Indonesia, I will maximize the position and power I have to become a 'voice' from young people, especially young women to inspire them regarding social and political issues and other issues. I will voice more vocally again, for young people and to help the surrounding environment to become a better environment.

=== Miss World 2019 ===
After winning Miss Indonesia 2019, Megonondo represented Indonesia at Miss World 2019, held at ExCeL London, U.K. on 14 December 2019, where she was placed in the top 40.

Awards and achievements
Preceded by West Java – Alya Nurshabrina	Miss Indonesia; 2019	Succeeded by South Sulawesi – Pricilia Carla Yules
Preceded by Natasya Dey	Miss Jambi; 2019	Succeeded by Larissa Amelinda Soerayana
