= Indahkus =

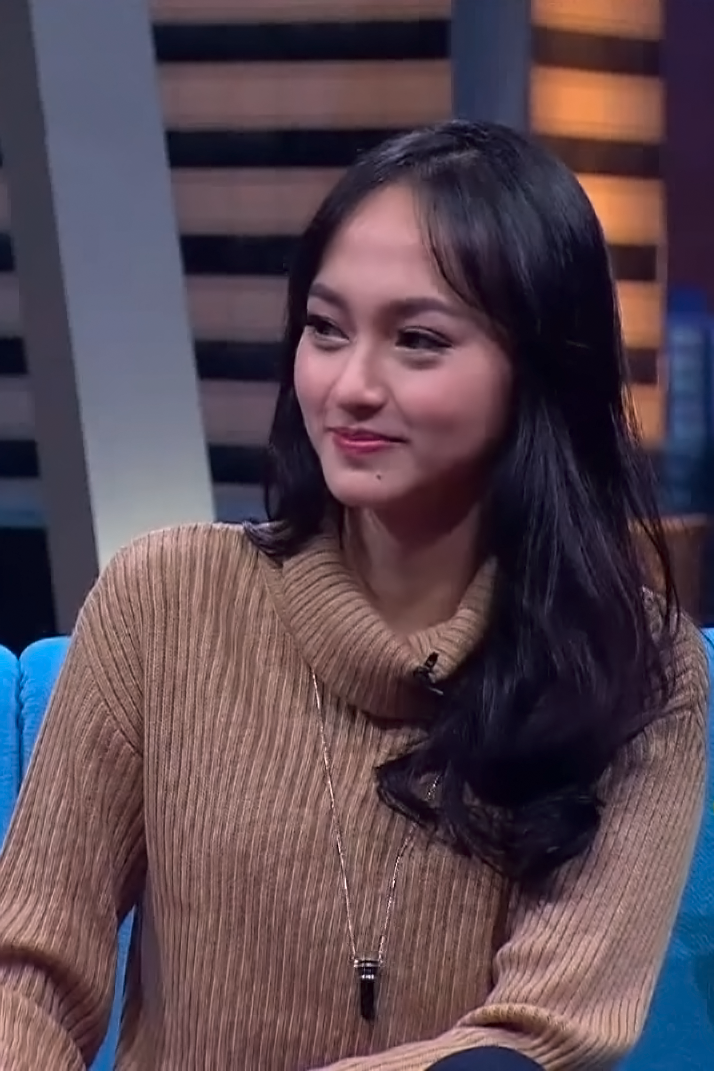

Background information
- Also known as: Indahkus, Indah Kusuma
- Born: Indah Kusumaningrum; 9 April 1994 (age 32); Padang, West Sumatra, Indonesia
- Origin: Cimahi, West Java, Indonesia
- Genres: Dance-pop; Pop; Hipdut
- Occupations: Singer; Songwriter; Actress
- Instruments: Piano; Vocal
- Years active: 2015–present
- Label: Sevenstars Entertainment

Indah Kusumaningrum (born 9 April 1994), professionally known as Indahkus, is an Indonesian singer, songwriter, actress and vlogger. She holds a medical degree from Jenderal Achmad Yani University. She was also a participant of Miss Indonesia 2014 represented Central Sulawesi. as information from berita12.com, Indah Kusumaningrum began her musical career in 2015, when she released her first single Inikah Cinta, a cover song originally released by the Indonesian boyband M.E. In 2016 she also starred in the NET. television series Stereo. Her second single was released in 2017, titled Jangan Lihat Tangisku. She also achieved minor popularity in Vietnam.

== Discography ==
Year	Title	Album
2015	Inikah Cinta	(Single)
2016	Inikah Cinta (Dance Version)	(Single)
2017	Jangan Lihat Tangisku	(Single)
2020	Endless Loop	(Single)

== Filmography ==
=== Film ===
Year	Title	Role	Production
2021	Patriot Taruna: Virgo and The Sparklings		Screenplay Films Bumilangit

=== Television series ===
Year	Title	Role	Notes
2015	Stereo	Amanda	Main cast; 20 episodes

=== Webseries ===
Year	Title	Role	Production	Channel
2019	Cerita Dokter Cinta	Dokter Lana	Maxstream Original	Maxstream
