= Asyifa Latief =

Indonesian model (born 1988)

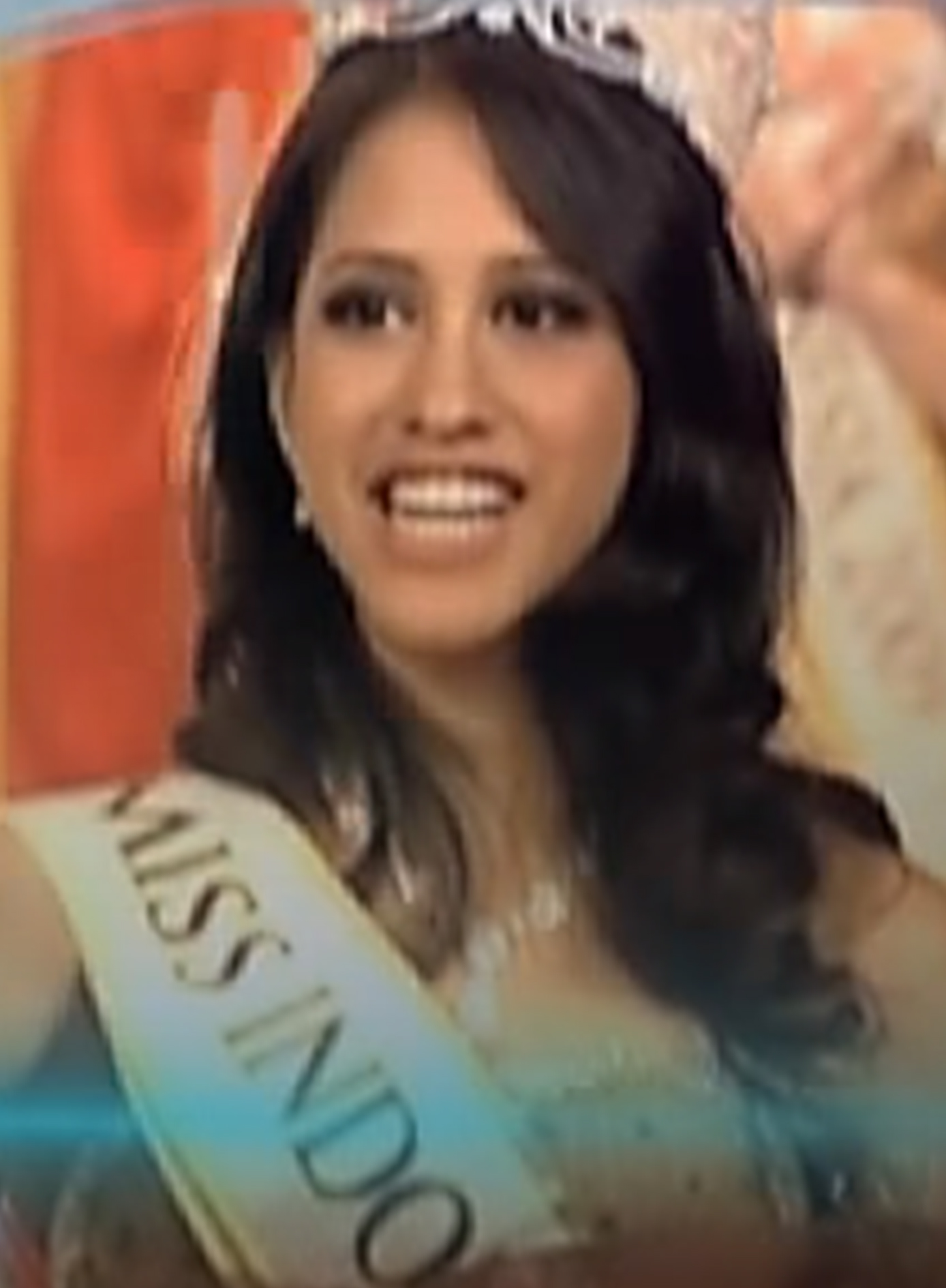
- Asyifa Latief after being crowned as Miss Indonesia 2010
- Born: Asyifa Syafiningdyah Putriambami Latief; 20 September 1988 (age 38); Bandung, Indonesia
- Education: Parahyangan Catholic University, Bandung, West Java
- Beauty pageant titleholder
- Title: Miss Indonesia 2010; Miss World Indonesia 2010
- Major competitions: Miss Indonesia 2010; (Winner); Miss World 2010; (Unplaced)

Asyifa Syafiningdyah Putrambami Latief (born 20 September 1988), better known as Asyifa Latief, is an Indonesian model and beauty pageant titleholder who was crowned Miss Indonesia 2010. She was the first Arab-Indonesian to be crowned as Miss Indonesia.

== Miss Indonesia 2010 and Miss World 2010 ==
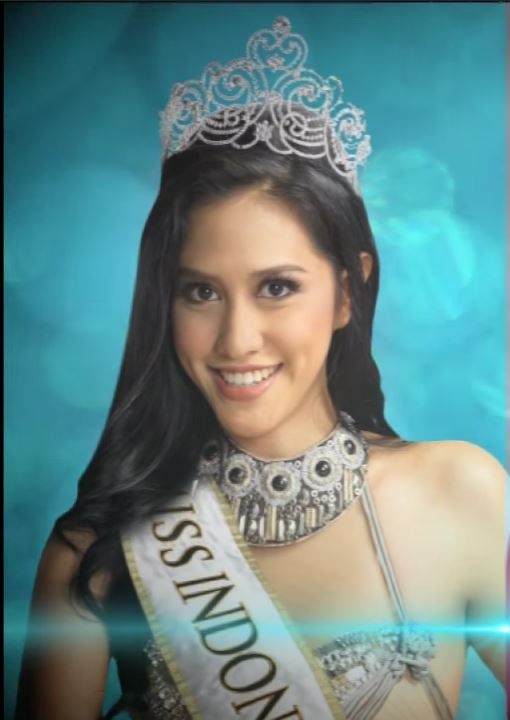
Asyifa appear on Miss Indonesia 2010 TV-commercial.

Latief represented Indonesia at the Miss World 2010 competition, which was held in November 2010, as she won Miss Indonesia 2010. Latief was also crowned as Miss Best Body. She is a model and a student at Parahyangan Catholic University at Bandung, majoring in accounting.

Asyifa Latief is successor incumbent at 1 June 2010 – 3 June 2011 (only 1 year hold the crown) and her crown is given to Miss Indonesia 2011. For her victory in Miss Indonesia, Asyifa represented Indonesia in Miss World 2010, in Sanya, China where she made it into the Top 40 ' 'fast track' 'Miss World Talent.

== Career ==
In 2014, she became the presenter of "TodaY's Indonesia" on TIC along with Louisa Kusnandar and Prisma Kinanti. Currently she hosts Sports Lens on antv and Newslog on Metro TV. and the program Good Night Indonesia in antv together with Indra Bekti and Puteri Indonesia 2011, Maria Selena.

Aside from pursuing the presenter world, Asyifa also manages a leather bag business made of imported leather, imported specifically from Italy, United States, and Hong Kong, targeting consumers. woman.

Awards and achievements
Preceded by Kerenina Sunny Halim	Miss Indonesia; 2010	Succeeded by Astrid Ellena
