= Kerenina Sunny Halim =

Indonesian-American model

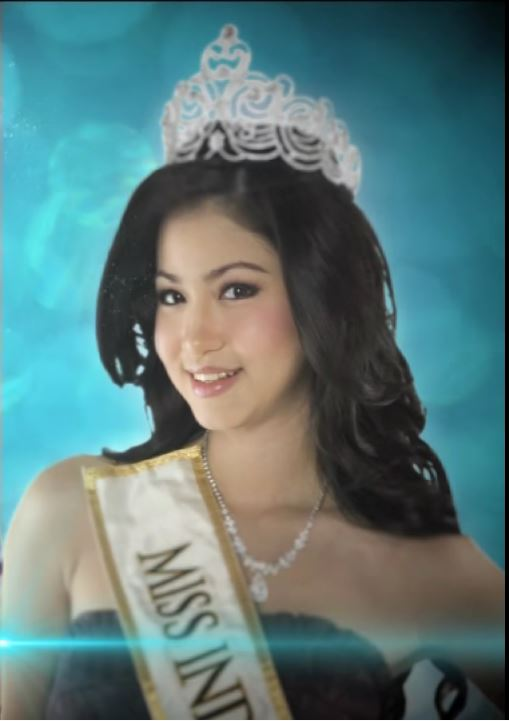
- Halim in the Miss Indonesia 2009 TV-commercial
- Born: Kerenina Sunny Halim; 13 June 1986 (age 40); Jakarta, Indonesia
- Beauty pageant titleholder
- Title: Miss Indonesia 2009; Miss World Indonesia 2009
- Major competitions: Miss Indonesia 2009; (Winner); Miss World 2009; (Unplaced)

Kerenina Sunny Halim (also spelled Karenina; born in Jakarta, 13 June 1986) is an Indonesian-American model and beauty pageant titleholder who was crowned Miss Indonesia (DKI Jakarta) 2009. She represented Indonesia at the Miss World 2009 in South Africa in November–December the same year.

== Early life and education ==
Halim is of mixed descent, her mother is from Montana, United States and her father from Bandung, Indonesia. She is the fourth of six children. Both her parents were members of the controversial religious group The Family International.

Halim attended a Christian boarding school from grade school until her senior high school graduation, and in her teen years actively participated in several humanitarian projects throughout the Indonesian archipelago. By the age of 22, Halim had received long-distance certificates in Marketing, Childhood Psychology and Teaching, Home Economics, and Contemporary Arts, all of which were issued by the Christian Vocational Academy, a long-distance learning institution.

In her last year of high school, Halim completed a performing arts course while she lived in Denpasar, Bali. She performed with a modern contemporary arts dance troupe which participated in several competitions, and attained first place in the Jakarta Arts festival 2001. In addition, she also took a music course in drums, and attended vocals lessons. During her first year of college, she spent a year in India, where she helped to set up a school for deaf children. She also played an active role in consolidating women's rights in the women's correctional institute in New Delhi.

== Early career and modelling ==
At the age of 21, she moved out on her own and began to work independently, teaching for the next two years on subjects such a character building and child psychology at a grade school in Jakarta, Sekolah Mentari. Halim also spent her spare time doing various TV commercials and modelling jobs, such as catwalks at fashion shows and photo spreads for fashion magazines. In April 2009, she auditioned for the Miss Indonesia 2009 competition and was selected as one of the 33 finalists to compete for the Miss Indonesia 2009 title. Halim was chosen to be the representative from DKI Jakarta and along with 32 other finalists began the two weeks quarantine preparation program leading up to the grand final event of the competition. Halim went on to win the title and was crowned Miss Indonesia 2009 at the grand finale event on 5 June 2009.

Within the same year Halim was also sent as the representative of Indonesia to compete in the Miss World competition, in November and December 2009. She was the first Indonesian to win top scores in all five Fast Track competitions of the Miss World competition.

== Career ==
Halim is an entrepreneur and active in several charity and humanitarian organisations focusing on Education and Healthcare for underprivileged children around Indonesia.

Halim is co-founder and partner of OYA Clinics Indonesia, a Medical and Healthcare Clinic located in Taman Sari Semanggi, South Jakarta and operating under the medical license of Yayasan Rumah Sakit MH Thamrin. OYA Clinic provides general healthcare services, Aesthetic services and treatments, an in-house Dental Clinic and IV Drip facilities for hangover and Sports applications, and Women and Children specialised healthcare services, as well as a developing Lab tests service for Hormone testing and Gut Flora imbalances.

Halim is also Head Of Corporate Communication in MFUN an ICO for the gaming industry and traded on the INDODAX and Cryptocurrency Exchange (MFUNN MOBILE MEDIA PRIVATE LIMITED) from January 2018 – Present.

== Philanthropy ==
Halim helped build a school and living center in Solo, Central Java for the displaced children from Ambon where they were relocated to after the unrest and civil war in Ambon, in which most of the children lost their parents or several members of their family.

In the aftermath of the 2004 Indian Ocean tsunami, Halim participated in humanitarian work, serving as a teacher for the children in Aceh. Her work was on behalf of the controversial religious group The Family International. Both of Halim's parents were members of the group.

Halim is also co-founder of Yayasan Let's Share Indonesia, a charitable organisation founded in 2014. Yayasan Let's Share is based in Jakarta, Indonesia focused on providing education and healthcare throughout Indonesia.

Halim is also partner in Project Kooka, an initiative using Art for Charity, to fund education fees and scholarships for orphaned and street children throughout Jakarta. This project was established by Halim and her partner in 2017, which then went on to fund the building of a kindergarten school in west Sumba called Sekolah PAUD Melati I, in conjunction with Happy Hearts Foundation and Yayasan Putra Peduli. The school was launched and remains in operation since its official opening in January 2019.

Halim also co-founded and manages OYA Clinic's Humanitarian Aid project called OYA Peduli where they launched a vaccine campaign to provide free vaccine services for underprivileged children throughout Indonesia, and regularly help with free medical screening and medicinal care for orphaned and street children around Jakarta.

== Athletics ==
Halim is an Advanced Padi Certified AOW Diver, and has been avidly traveling and diving all over Indonesia. Halim received her Open Water Certification from Padi Dive Center in Indonesia in 2013, and began diving seriously since January 2018 to date. Halim currently holds a log of over 260 dives.

Halim became a member of Bengkel Crossfit in January 2018 in Jakarta, Indonesia, and competed in her first International competition, Crossfit Open, in April 2018, although she didn't finish due to a back injury she placed 14th overall for Woman's Scaled Category for the country of Indonesia. Later in the year, Halim participated in the yearly Regionals competition called the Crossfit Wod-off in September 2018. Halim competed in the Teams category and got 16th place. Halim also competed in the Annual JIS Crossfit Competition for Charity, this time she placed 6th in the Teams Category.

== Achievements in Miss World 2009 ==
- Beauty with a purpose, she was placed in the top 5
- Miss Talent, she placed in top 10.
- Beach beauty, she became first Indonesian delegates in Miss World called as semifinalist and placed in top 12.

Awards and achievements
Preceded by Sandra Angelia	Miss Indonesia; 2009	Succeeded by Asyifa Latief
