= Kristania Virginia Besouw =

Indonesian-American military nurse and beauty queen

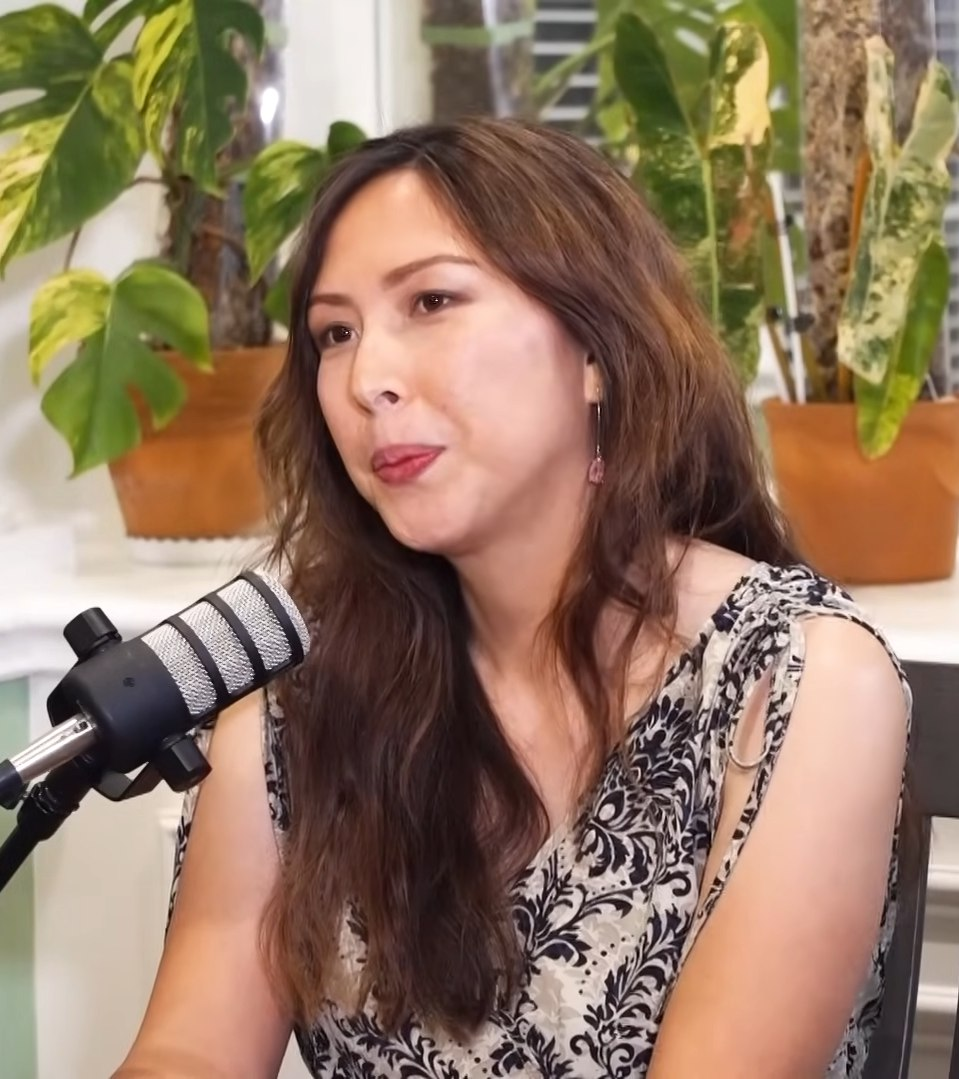
- Born: 7 May 1985 (age 41); Manado, Indonesia
- Allegiance: United States of America
- Rank: Sergeant (E-5)
- Awards: Army Commendation Medal Good Conduct Medal Army Achievement Medal
- Education: Sam Ratulangi University
- Spouses: Frank Piay (m. 2008; div. 2017) James Robert Hall (m. 2017)

Kristania Virginia Besouw (born 7 May 1985) is an Indonesian-American former military nurse and beauty pageant titleholder, notable for being Miss Indonesia 2006. She was the first Miss Indonesia in the Miss World Pageant (2006 in Poland), representing North Sulawesi. She placed within the big 24 Miss Sport, and promoted the importance of infant measles vaccination on behalf of UNICEF, earning her the nickname 'Ratu Campak' (Queen of Measles).

== Early life ==
Besouw was born in Manado on 7 May 1985, to the late Yannemen Besouw, an Indonesian ex-naval serviceman, and Esther Tampi. Her paternal grandfather was a police officer. Born to a military family, Besouw was described by her brother, Stevano Besouw, as a tomboy. She entered formal education at SD Negeri Kombi (Kombi State Elementary), then moved to Jakarta to attend SD Pangkalan Jati. She then moved to Beijing and there attended the Pakistan International School Beijing, and Beijing 55 International School. For her secondary schooling, she returned to Indonesia and attended Ebenezer Secondary School in Manado for lower and upper secondary. Subsequently, she was admitted to the International Business Administration program at Sam Ratulangi University's Faculty of Economics.

== In the United States Army ==
In 2007, a year after winning the Miss Indonesia pageant, Besouw moved to the United States (her mother was already in the country), initially on a B1/B2 visa, later adjusting status to F1 (student). She first settled in Los Angeles, then moved to Colby, Kansas, citing lower costs, where she pursued a degree in nursing; this had the effect of terminating her studies at Sam Ratulangi University. Through the Military Accessions Vital to National Interest program, Besouw was admitted to United States citizenship directly from her F-1 status in 2014, and she also joined the United States Army as a nurse. Besouw said in a 2020 interview that one of the motivating factors behind this decision was for her to avoid deportation to Indonesia.

== Personal life ==
Besouw was married to Frank Piay, a medical doctor from the Philippines, from 2008 to 2017, ending in their divorce. In September 2016, Besouw attended the Non-Commissioned Officer Academy. In a November 2016 interview, she expressed her desire to leave the military and return to Manado, citing fatigue. Besouw married James Robert Hall, a US Army veteran, on 21 August 2017. She did not return to Indonesia until 2019, and did not see her father before his death in 2011. Besouw was formerly stationed at Fort Hood in Killeen, Texas. In October 2018, her contract of service with the US Army expired, and she exited active service. From March 2019 to the present day, she has been working as a Registered Nurse at HCA Healthcare in Webster, Texas. From August to November 2020, she was an ICU registered nurse at the Memorial Hermann Health System.

Awards and achievements
Preceded by Imelda Fransisca	Miss Indonesia; 2006	Succeeded by Kamidia Radisti
