= Miss Indonesia 2012 =

- Date: April 28, 2012
- Presenters: Amanda Zevannya, Ferdi Hassan
- Entertainment: Petra Sihombing, Max 5, Pentaboyz, S9B
- Venue: Hall D2 JIExpo, Kemayoran, Jakarta
- Broadcaster: RCTI
- Entrants: 33
- Placements: 15
- Winner: Ines Putri Tjiptadi Chandra; Bali
- Miss Congeniality: Dina Michelle Parwestri (Papua)
- Miss Healthy: Patricia Gunawan (Gorontalo)
- Miss Lifestyle: Nathania Lukman (North Sulawesi)
- Miss Favorite: Meiling Thomas (West Kalimantan)

Miss Indonesia 2012 is the eighth edition of Miss Indonesia. The pageant was held at Hall D2 JIExpo, Kemayoran on April 28, 2012, and was hosted by Ferdi Hassan and Amanda Zevannya. The current titleholder of Miss World, Ivian Sarcos attended the awarding night, when Astrid Ellena of East Java crowned her successor, Ines Putri Chandra from Bali.

== Results ==
=== Placements ===
Final result	Contestant
Miss Indonesia 2012	Bali - Ines Putri Tjiptadi Chandra
1st Runner-up	East Java - Ovi Dian Aryani Putri
2nd Runner-up	Jakarta SCR - Jennifer Sumia
Top 5	North Maluku - Natasha Gabriella; West Java - Adila Wisusena
Top 15	Aceh - Rafiqa Soraya Azhar; Bangka-Belitung Islands - Kanty Widjaja; Banten - Anastasia Praditha; Bengkulu - Galuh Adika Alifani; East Kalimantan - Riva Tamara Indra; Gorontalo - Patricia Gunawan; North Sulawesi - Nathania Lukman; West Kalimantan - Meiling Thomas; West Papua - Fitrah Islami; Yogyakarta - Dea Amelia Irwanto

=== Fast Track Winners ===
Fast track events held during preliminary round and the winners of Fast Track events are automatically qualified to enter the semifinal round. This year's fast track events include: Talent, Sport, Modelling, and Beauty With A Purpose.

- Aceh - Rafiqa Soraya Azhar (Talent)
- Gorontalo - Patricia Gunawan (Beauty with A Purpose)
- West Java - Adila Wisusena (Sport)
- Yogyakarta - Dea Amelia Irwanto (Modelling)

=== Special awards ===
Final result	Contestant
Miss Healthy	Gorontalo - Patricia Gunawan
Miss Beautiful Skin	Aceh - Rafiqa Soraya Azhar
Miss Online	Central Java - Maria Gabriella
Miss Congeniality	Papua - Dina Michelle Parwestri
Miss Lifestyle	North Sulawesi - Nathania Lukman
Miss Favorite	West Kalimantan - Meiling Thomas

== Judges ==
- Liliana Tanoesoedibjo
- Martha Tilaar
- Harry Darsono
- Ferry Salim
- Adam Chesnof

== Contestants ==
- Aceh - Rafiqa Soraya Azhar
- Bali - Ines Putri Tjiptadi Chandra
- Bangka-Belitung Islands - Kanty Widjaja
- Banten - Anastasia Praditha
- Bengkulu - Galuh Adika Alifani
- Central Java - Maria Gabriella
- Central Kalimantan - Cindy Tabita
- Central Sulawesi - Tasya Eunike Watania
- East Java - Ovi Dian Aryani Putri
- East Kalimantan - Riva Tamara Indra
- East Nusa Tenggara - Dona Maria Rosalia da Silva
- Gorontalo - Patricia Gunawan
- Jakarta SCR - Jennifer Sumia
- Jambi - Tarisya Ramantha
- Lampung - Vany Rizky Ayunda
- Maluku - Inggrid Elizabeth
- North Maluku - Natasha Gabriella
- North Sulawesi - Nathania Lukman
- North Sumatra - Kastria Soldiana Elizabeth Hutagaol
- Papua - Dina Michelle Parwestri
- Riau - Diana Kristiana Lesmana
- Riau Islands - Ayu Meivitasari
- South Kalimantan - Levina Faby Naomi
- South Sulawesi - Nur Fitriyani Faridin
- South Sumatra - Stef Hanie Michella
- Southeast Sulawesi - Sujayanti Pirono
- West Java - Adila Wisusena
- West Kalimantan - Meiling Thomas
- West Nusa Tenggara - Devi Oktaviani
- West Papua - Fitrah Islami
- West Sulawesi - Vanni Adriani Puspanegara
- West Sumatra - Santry Hendrodjanoe
- Yogyakarta - Dea Amelia Irwanto

== Crossovers ==
Miss Indonesia Earth

- 2012:: Kastria Hutagaol (1st Runner Up / Miss Air Indonesia)
- 2013:: Kanty Widjaja (1st Runner Up / Miss Air Indonesia)

Wajah Femina

- 2013:: Kastria Hutagaol
