= Maria Rahajeng =

Indonesian beauty pageant titleholder

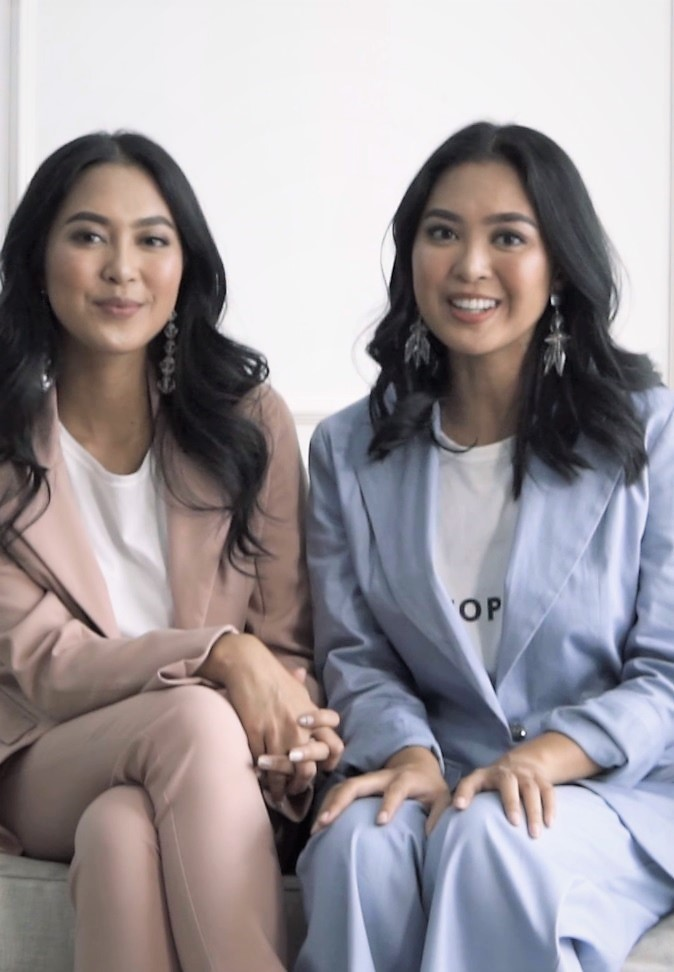
- Rahajeng with her twin sister Elizabeth Rahajeng in 2018
- Education: Pelita Harapan University
- Relatives: Agnes Rahajeng
- Beauty pageant titleholder
- Title: Miss Indonesia 2014; Miss World Indonesia 2014
- Major competitions: Miss Indonesia 2014; (Winner); Miss World 2014; (Top 25)

Maria Rahajeng (born ; 4 October 1991) is an Indonesian beauty pageant titleholder, model, and television presenter who represented West Sulawesi and won Miss Indonesia 2014, against 33 other contestants on 17 February 2014. Rahajeng represented Indonesia at Miss World 2014, held in London, United Kingdom, in December 2014, reaching the top 25.

== Early life and education ==
Maria Asteria Sastrayu Rahajeng was born in Blora, Central Java, and spent part of her childhood in California, United States. She later returned to Indonesia to continue her education. She graduated from Pelita Harapan University with a degree in Broadcasting Communication and graduated cum laude. She is a TV presenter, and model.

== Pageantry ==
=== Miss Indonesia 2014 ===
Rahajeng entered and won Miss Indonesia 2014, representing West Sulawesi, on 17 February 2014. She competed against 33 other provincial representatives in the national pageant held in Jakarta. She was crowned by the outgoing titleholder Vania Larissa.

=== Miss World 2014 ===
As the winner of Miss Indonesia 2014, Rahajeng represented Indonesia at Miss World 2014, held in London, United Kingdom, in December 2014. She advanced to the Top 25 of the competition, which was won by Rolene Strauss of South Africa.

During the competition, Rahajeng was among the finalists recognized in the Beauty with a Purpose fast-track event. Her project was selected alongside representatives from India, Kenya, Brazil, and Guyana as one of the winning projects in the category.

== Life after Miss World ==
After completing her reign as Miss Indonesia 2014 and participating in Miss World 2014, Rahajeng continued her career in the entertainment and media industry. She worked as a television presenter and host, following her background in broadcasting and communications.

Rahajeng later became involved in international media projects. Together with her twin sister, Elizabeth Rahajeng, she was appointed as a correspondent for E! News Asia, where they presented segments covering lifestyle, fashion, beauty, travel, and entertainment in Indonesia.

In addition to her work in television, Rahajeng has remained active as a model, presenter, and public figure, participating in various fashion, beauty, and social events.

== Personal life ==
Maria Rahajeng was born to Christophorus Harno and Maria Ekawati. She has a twin sister, Elizabeth Crysansia Sastrayu Rahajeng, and a younger sister, Agnes Rahajeng.

Her twin sister Elizabeth has also been involved in the beauty pageant industry and competed in Puteri Indonesia Bali 2014, where she received the Puteri Berbakat award. Agnes later followed her sisters' involvement in pageantry. Representing Banten, she was crowned Puteri Indonesia 2026, becoming the first representative from the province to win the national title.

In August 2025, Maria married Matthias Haerens in a ceremony held in Bali, Indonesia. The wedding was attended by family and close friends, including her sisters Elizabeth and Agnes Rahajeng.

Awards and achievements
Preceded by Vania Larissa	Miss Indonesia; 2014	Succeeded by Maria Harfanti
