= Sandra Angelia =

Indonesian model and beauty pageant titleholder

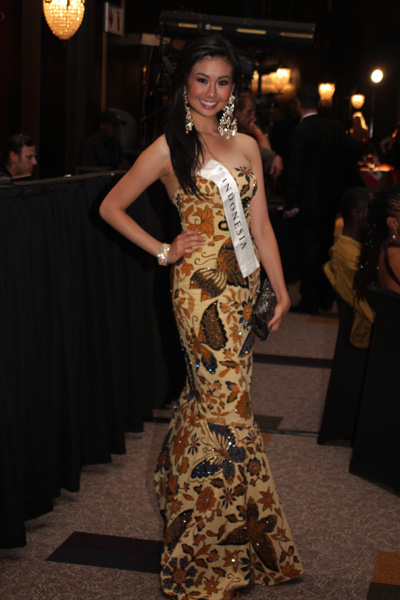
- Born: Sandra Angelia Hadisiswantoro; 11 May 1986 (age 40); Surabaya, East Java, Indonesia
- Beauty pageant titleholder
- Title: Miss Indonesia 2008; Miss World Indonesia 2008
- Major competitions: Miss Indonesia 2008; (Winner); Miss World 2008; (Unplaced)

Sandra Angelia Hadisiswantoro (born 11 May 1986) is an Indonesian model and beauty pageant titleholder who was crowned Miss Indonesia 2008, representing East Java. She also received the "Miss Favorite" award, as voted by the audience, defeating first runner-up Kartika Indah Pelapory. As Miss Indonesia 2008, she represented Indonesia at Miss World 2008, held in Johannesburg, South Africa.

== Pageantry ==
=== Miss Indonesia 2008 ===
Angelia represented East Java at the Miss Indonesia 2008 pageant, held at the Jakarta Convention Center on 13 May 2008. She was crowned by the outgoing titleholder, Kamidia Radisti, becoming the third winner of the Miss Indonesia pageant. In addition to winning the national title, Angelia also received the "Miss Favorite" award, which was determined by public voting.

During her reign, Angelia carried out promotional and charitable activities as Miss Indonesia and served as Indonesia's official representative at the Miss World 2008 competition. She held the Miss Indonesia title until 5 June 2009, when she crowned her successor, Karenina Sunny Halim.

=== Miss World 2008 ===
As Miss Indonesia 2008, Angelia represented Indonesia at the Miss World 2008 pageant, held on 13 December 2008 in Johannesburg, South Africa. The competition was won by Ksenia Sukhinova of Russia.

Although Angelia did not advance to the semifinals, she participated in the pageant's fast-track events and promoted Indonesian culture throughout the competition. Her participation continued Indonesia's representation at Miss World following Kamidia Radisti in 2007.

== Personal life ==
Angelia is the eldest daughter and second child of Reverend Yusak Hadisiswantoro and Reverend Asti Tanuseputra. She comes from a Chinese Indonesian family and moved to Australia at the age of 13, where she spent part of her adolescence.

She is the maternal granddaughter of Reverend Abraham Alex Tanuseputra, the founder of Bethany Church, one of the largest Pentecostal churches in Indonesia.

Angelia completed her undergraduate education at the University of Western Australia in Perth, Australia, where she studied architecture. Before entering the beauty pageant industry, she pursued her academic career and trained in the field of architectural design.

Awards and achievements
Preceded by Kamidia Radisti	Miss Indonesia; 2008	Succeeded by Kerenina Sunny Halim
