= Miss Indonesia =

Beauty pageant

- Miss Indonesia Org.
- Formation: 2005 (14 years ago)
- Type: Beauty pageant
- Headquarters: Jakarta
- Location: Indonesia
- Members: Miss World
- Official language: Indonesian and English
- President and Chief Executive Officer Miss Indonesia: Liliana Tanoesoedibjo
- Key people: Martha Tilaar; Wulan Tilaar; Lina Priscilla
- Website: Official website

Miss Indonesia is a national beauty pageant in Indonesia, organized by MNC Group under Miss Indonesia Organization, chaired by Liliana Tanoesoedibjo and sponsored by Sariayu Martha Tilaar. The winner of Miss Indonesia represents the country in Miss World pageant, one of the Big Four international beauty pageants and participates in various social actions in cooperation with Yayasan Jalinan Kasih, MNC Peduli and Miss World Organization program, Beauty with a Purpose.

The current Miss Indonesia is Audrey Bianca Callista of Jakarta SCR who was crowned by Monica Kezia Sembiring of North Sumatra on July 9, 2025. She will represent Indonesia at Miss World 2026.

== History ==
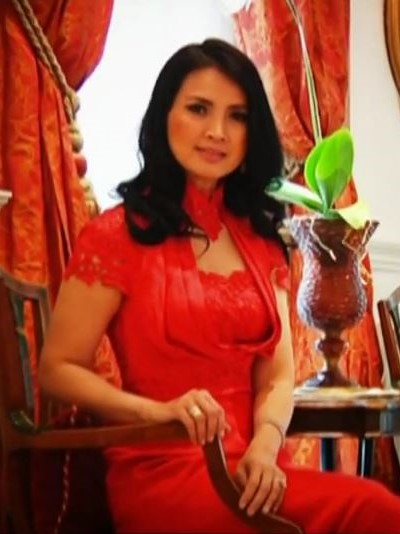
Indonesian media tycoon and politician, Liliana Tanaja Tanoesoedibjo as the President and chief executive officer of MNC Group and Miss Indonesia Org.

Miss Indonesia Organization together with Puteri Indonesia Organization is widely supported by the President and Cabinet of the Republic of Indonesia. In 2019, Joko Widodo announced the Miss Indonesia and Puteri Indonesia as the "National Intangible Cultural Heritage of Indonesia", which carries the values of Indonesian culture and society togetherness, to celebrate the role of women in the creative industry, environment, tourism, education and social awareness. In line with that, Angela Tanoesoedibjo the eldest daughter of media magnate MNC Group Hary Tanoesoedibjo and Miss Indonesia President and chief executive officer Liliana Tanaja Tanoesoedibjo chosen as The Deputy of Ministry of tourism and Creative Economy of The Republic of Indonesia by the President of Indonesia, Joko Widodo at the Istana Negara Palace in Central Jakarta.

In 2005, the Miss Indonesia org. was established, is a national beauty pageant in Indonesia, organized by their own media company MNC Group under Miss Indonesia Organization, chaired by the Indonesian Business conglomerate, Media tycoon and Politician Hary Tanoesoedibjo wife - Liliana Tanaja Tanoesoedibjo and sponsored by Sariayu Martha Tilaar. The winner of Miss Indonesia represents the country in Miss World pageant, one of the Big Four international beauty pageants and participates in various social actions in cooperation with Yayasan Jalinan Kasih, MNC Peduli and Miss World Organization program, Beauty with a Purpose. The first Miss Indonesia to compete at Miss World beauty pageant is the former Indonesian National Armed Forces Reservist and United States Army Nurse Corps, Kristania Virginia Besouw who competed in Miss World 2006 in Palace of Culture and Science, Warsaw, Poland.

== Selection process ==
In order to represent her province at the National Finals, each delegate must go through an audition process conducted in major cities of Indonesia. Each year, a total of 38 delegates are selected to participate at the final round, one from each province.

== Titleholders ==
In 2005, the Miss Indonesia winner for the first time competed at the Miss ASEAN pageant, where the second edition was held in Jakarta, Indonesia and placed as the 1st Runner-up. In 2006, Miss Indonesia lost the franchise of the Miss ASEAN pageant and repositioned as Miss World Indonesia to represent Indonesia at the Miss World pageant. On occasions, when the winner does not qualify (due to age) for either contest, a runner-up is sent.

The winner of the contest receives the title Miss Indonesia and is eligible to represent Indonesia in the Miss World pageant. Miss Indonesia wears a crown of white gold with swarovski, presented by Untung Bersama Sejahtera (UBS Gold) since 2009.

In 2016, UBS Gold introduced the new Miss Indonesia crown model. The philosophy of the crown is Beauty with a Purpose that Miss Indonesia joins hands with the weak and children to make the world better.

In 2020, Miss Indonesia and UBS Gold again introduced the new Miss Indonesia crown model entitled "Spirit of Indonesia". The crown consists of a frame made of white gold, encrusted with swarovski zirconia to give it a red accent. The combination of red and white symbolizes Indonesia. This new crown is expected to bring fighting spirit to Indonesian women in the global arena.

Year	Miss Indonesia	1st Runner-up	2nd Runner-up	3rd Runner-up	Runners-up, in order 4th through 6th
2005	Imelda Fransisca; West Java	Joice Triatman; Central Java	Kiki Agustina; South Sumatra	Not awarded from 2005 to 2015	Not awarded from 2005 to 2015
2006	Kristania Virginia Besouw; North Sulawesi	Putu Yunita Oktarini; Bali	Josephine Amelia Widagdo; Central Java	Not awarded from 2005 to 2015	Not awarded from 2005 to 2015
2007	Kamidia Radisti; West Java	Verna Inkiriwang; Central Sulawesi	I Gusti Ayu Agung Ary Kusumawardhani; Bali	Not awarded from 2005 to 2015	Not awarded from 2005 to 2015
2008	Sandra Angelia; East Java	Kartika Indah Pelapory; Maluku	Priscilla Yvonne Supit; North Sulawesi	Not awarded from 2005 to 2015	Not awarded from 2005 to 2015
2009	Kerenina Sunny Halim; Jakarta	Melati Putri Kusuma Dewi; West Sulawesi	Lia Angela Laksono; Bali	Not awarded from 2005 to 2015	Not awarded from 2005 to 2015
2010	Asyifa Latief; West Java	Clarashinta Arumdani; D.I Yogyakarta	Kartika Kusumaningtyas; East Java	Not awarded from 2005 to 2015	Not awarded from 2005 to 2015
2011	Astrid Yunadi; East Java	Amanda Roberta Zevannya; West Papua	Nadya Siddiqa; Banten	Not awarded from 2005 to 2015	Not awarded from 2005 to 2015
2012	Ines Putri; Bali	Ovi Dian Aryani Putri; East Java	Jennifer Sumia; Jakarta SCR	Not awarded from 2005 to 2015	Not awarded from 2005 to 2015
2013	Vania Larissa; West Kalimantan	Jovita Dwijayanti; Central Java	Shinta Nur Safira Azzahra; West Java	Not awarded from 2005 to 2015	Not awarded from 2005 to 2015
2014	Maria Asteria Sastrayu Rahajeng; West Sulawesi	Ellen Rachel Aragay; West Papua	Hanna Christiany Sugialam; East Java	Not awarded from 2005 to 2015	Not awarded from 2005 to 2015
2015	Maria Harfanti; D.I Yogyakarta	Savina Wibowo; South Sumatra	Yona Luvitalice Miagan; Papua	Not awarded from 2005 to 2015	Not awarded from 2005 to 2015
2016	Natasha Mannuela Halim; Bangka Belitung	Editha Aldillasari Rodianto; Bengkulu	Dian Bernika Ayuningtyas Silalahi; North Sumatra	Kidung Paramadita; Lampung	Nabilla Astrid Novianthy; Riau Islands
2017	Achintya Holte Nilsen; West Nusa Tenggara	Astrini Putri; Bengkulu	Ivhanrel Eltrisna Sumerah; North Sulawesi	Dinda Ayu Saraswati; Central Java	Anja Litani Ariella; D.I Yogyakarta
2018	Alya Nurshabrina; West Java	Narda Virelia; West Sumatra	Nadya Astrella Juliana; Central Java	Harini Merly Betrix Sondakh; North Sulawesi	Raudha Kasmir; Aceh
2019	Princess Mikhaelia Audrey Megonondo; Jambi	Elisa Jonathan; Banten	Sharon Margriet Sumolang; North Sulawesi	Tamara Dewi Gondo; East Java	Magdalena Rosari Ndona; East Nusa Tenggara Yolanda Lucia Tuasela; Maluku Vebbiantri Hananto; West Sulawesi
2020	Pricilia Carla Saputri Yules; South Sulawesi	Christella Fenisianti; Bangka Belitung	Nadia Riwu Kaho; East Nusa Tenggara	Larissa Amelinda Soerayana; Jambi	Salma Effendi; North Sumatra
2022	Audrey Vanessa Susilo; North Sulawesi	Ida Ayu Laksmi Anjali; Bali	Alyssandra Yemima Gabe Winyoto; East Java	Angelina Aqila Suryadi; West Kalimantan	Naomy Angelica Sembiring; Riau
2024	Monica Kezia Sembiring; North Sumatra	Clarita Cahya Adity; D.I Yogyakarta	Anna Sakurai Dananjaya; Bali	Priyanka Puteri Ariffia; Jakarta SCR	Arindina Aulia Taim; Aceh
2025	Audrey Bianca Callista; Jakarta SCR	Zefanya Sharon Iswanto; East Java	Cyndi Patricia Figo; North Sumatra	Anggia Rosvina Putri; Bengkulu	Nyoman Putri Vidya Paramanda; Bali Maria Ariska Happy Suntadi; West Papua
2026	Alda Callista Putri Setiawan; Central Papua	Yvette Eunike Rondonuwu; North Sulawesi	Thalia Lavender Young; West Kalimantan	Dian Kharisma Permata Putri; Bengkulu	Ni Made Padmawardhani Rakheswari; Bali

=== Gallery of winners ===
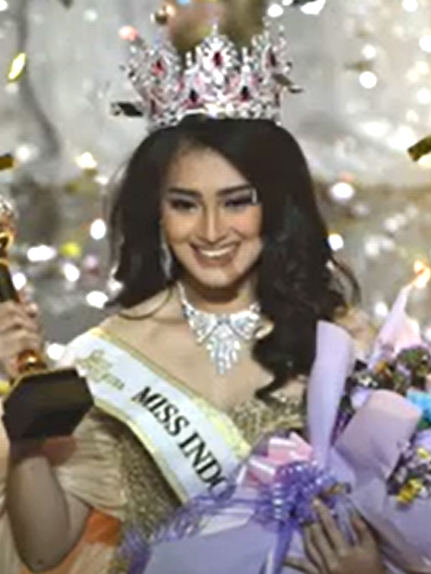
Miss Indonesia 2024-2025
Monica Kezia Sembiring,
of North Sumatra

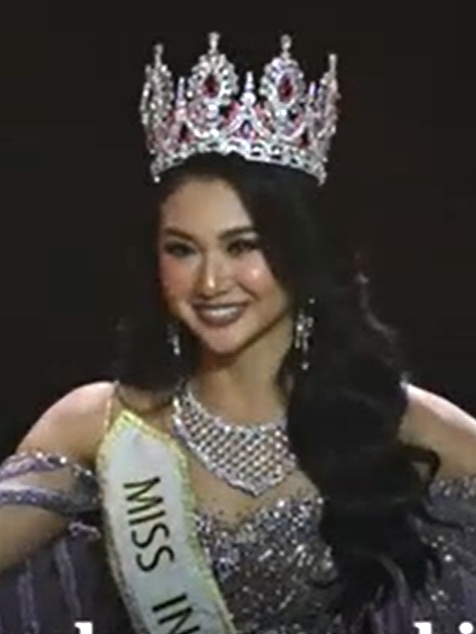
Miss Indonesia 2022-2023
Audrey Vanessa Susilo,
of South Sulawesi

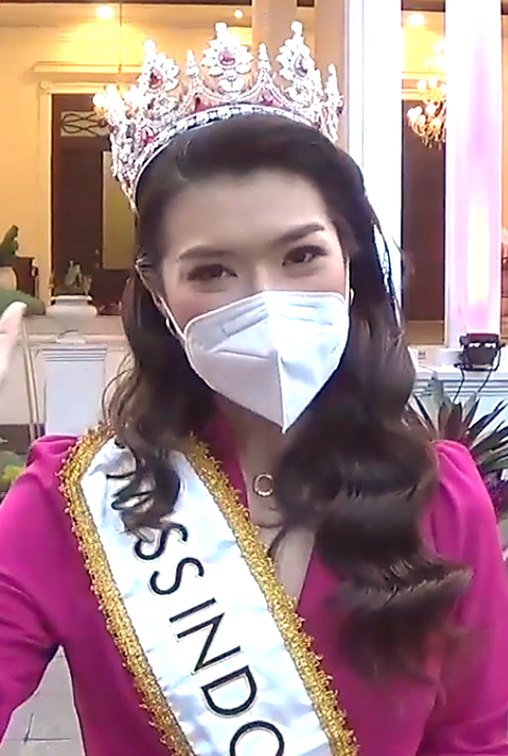
Miss Indonesia 2020-2021
Pricilia Carla Saputri Yules,
of South Sulawesi

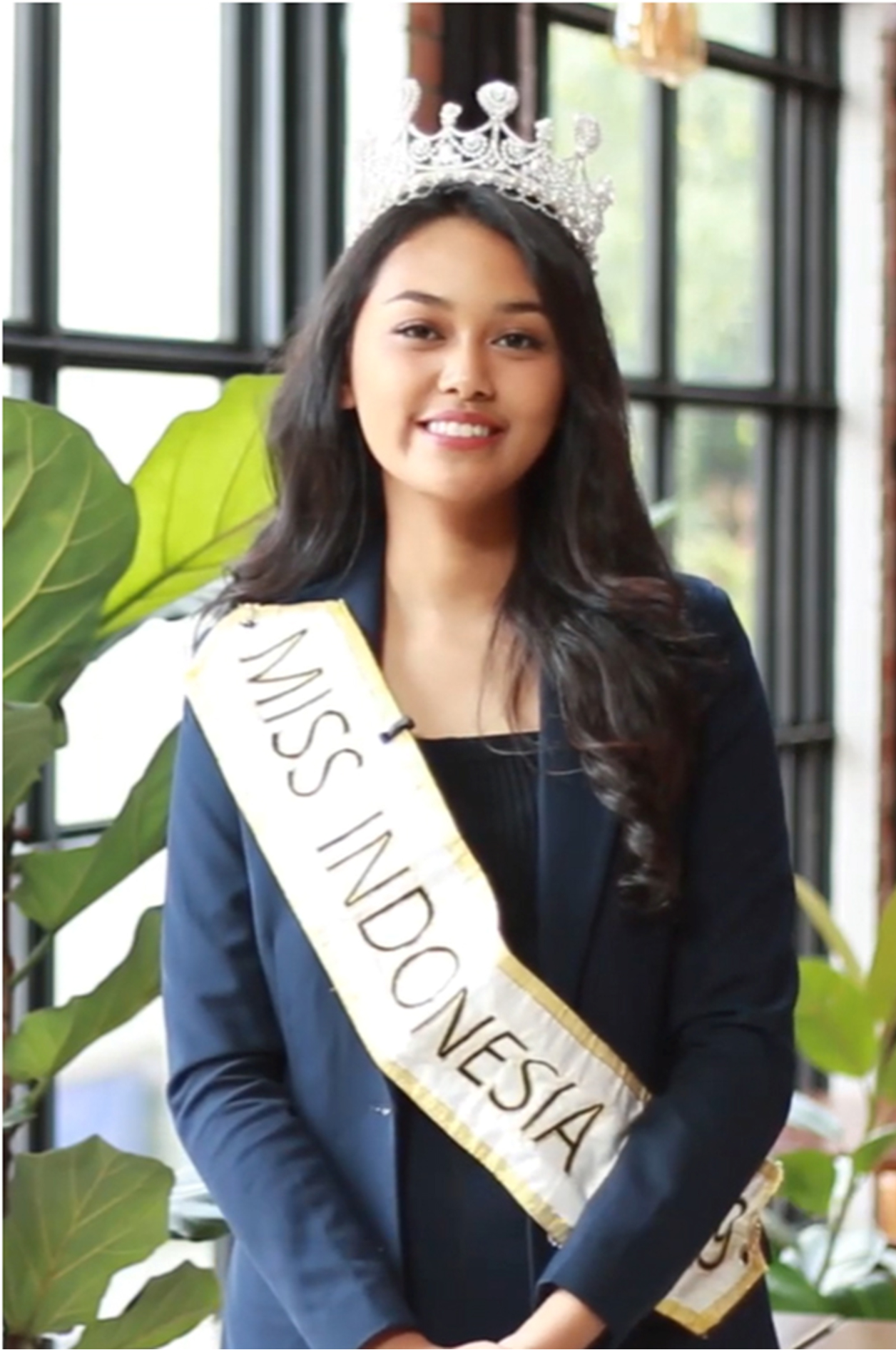
Miss Indonesia 2019
Princess Mikhaelia Audrey Megonondo,
of Jambi

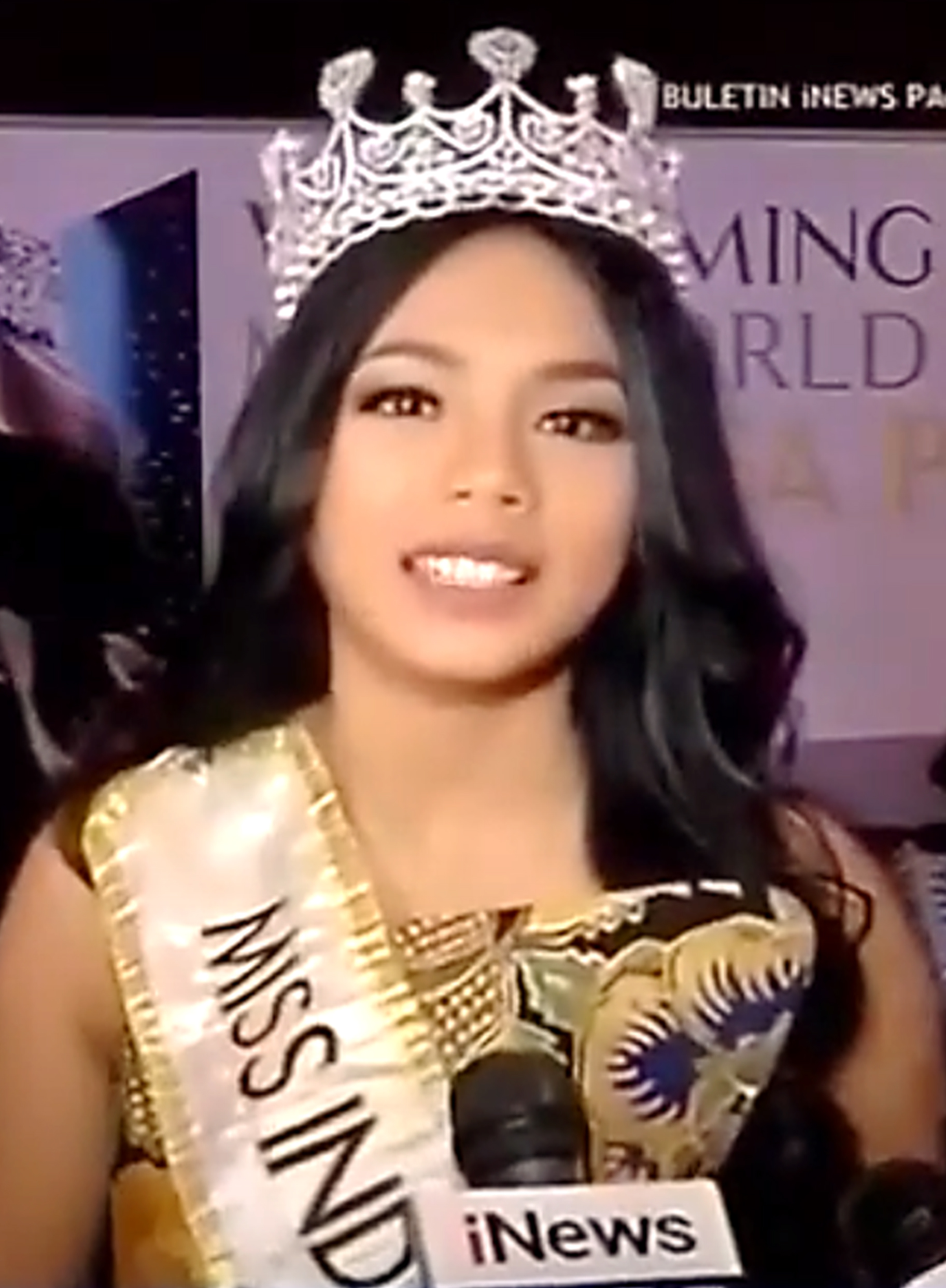
Miss Indonesia 2018
Alya Nurshabrina Samadikun,
of West Java

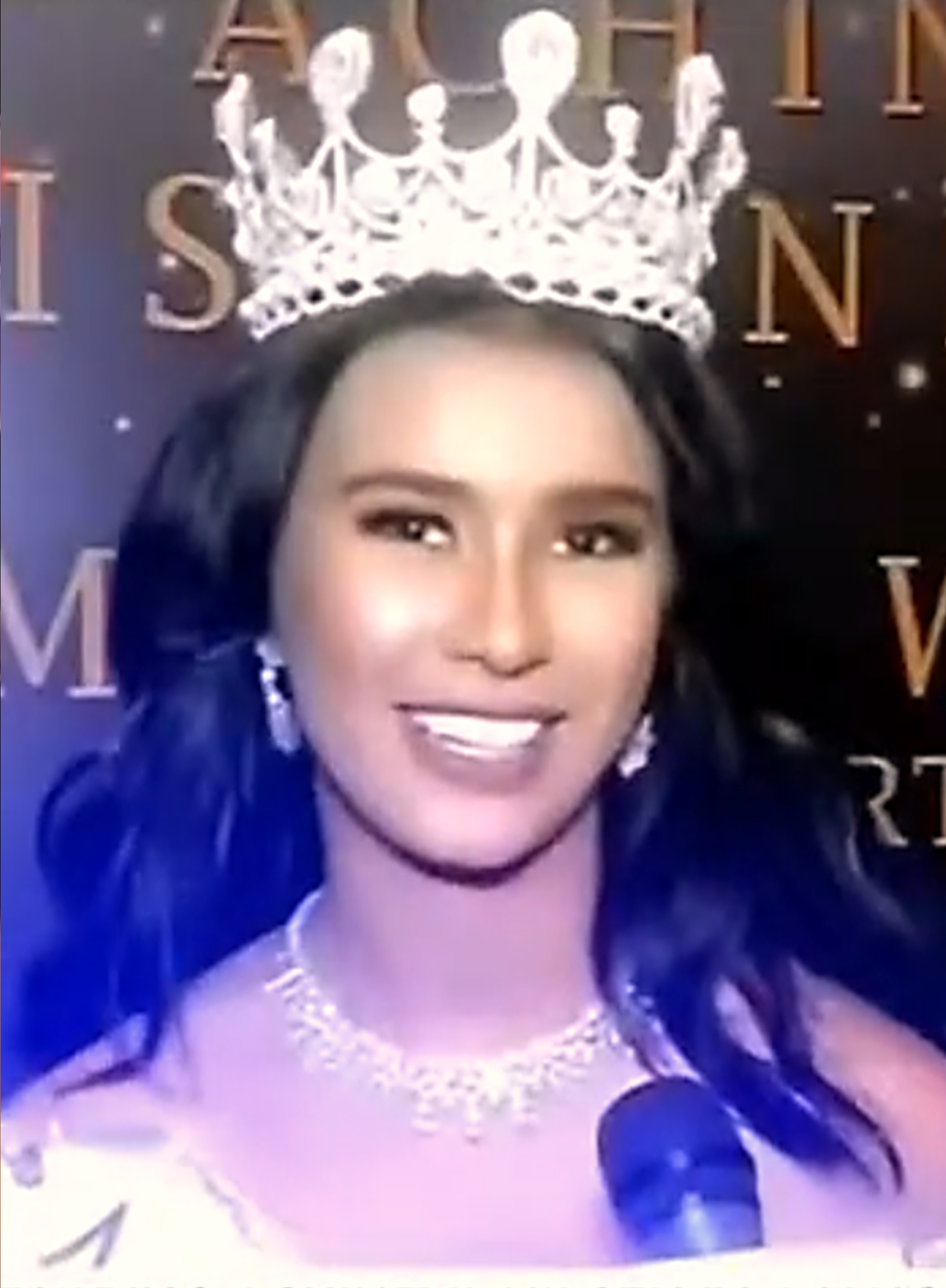
Miss Indonesia 2017
Achintya Holte Nilsen,
of West Nusa Tenggara

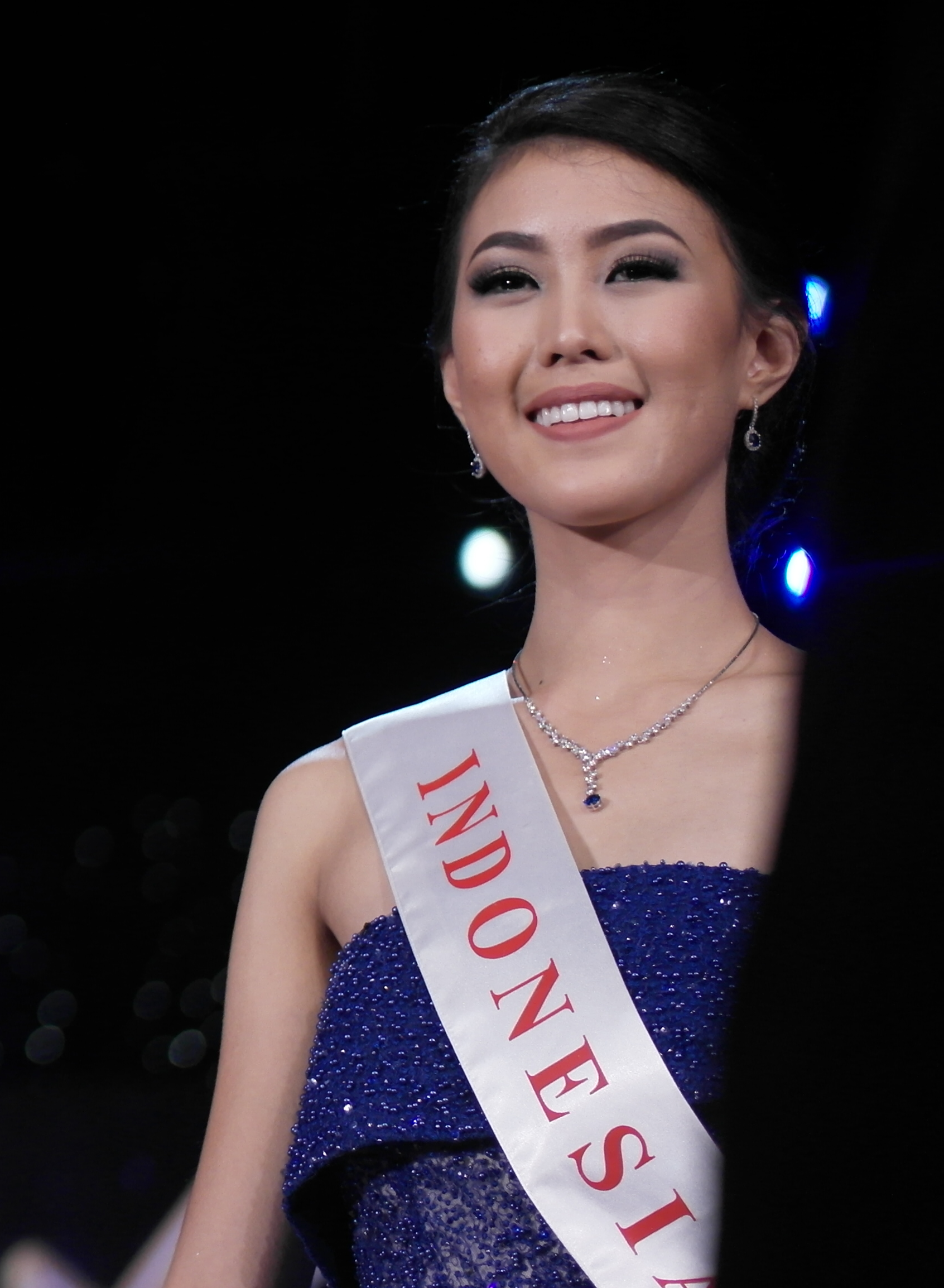
Miss Indonesia 2016
Natasha Mannuela Halim,
of Bangka Belitung

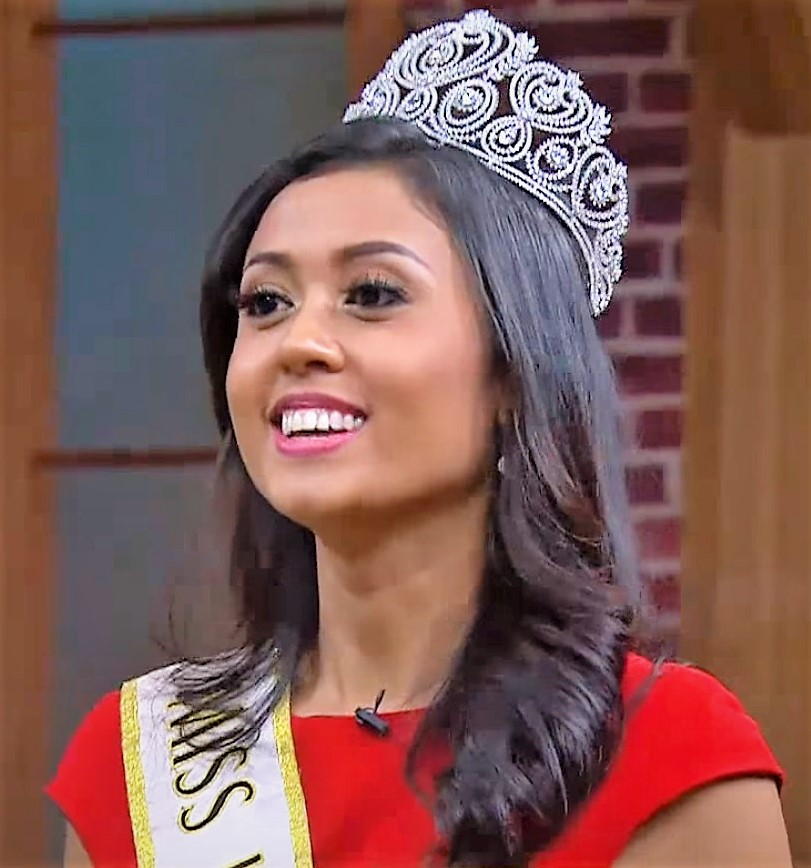
Miss Indonesia 2015
Maria Harfanti,
of SR Yogyakarta

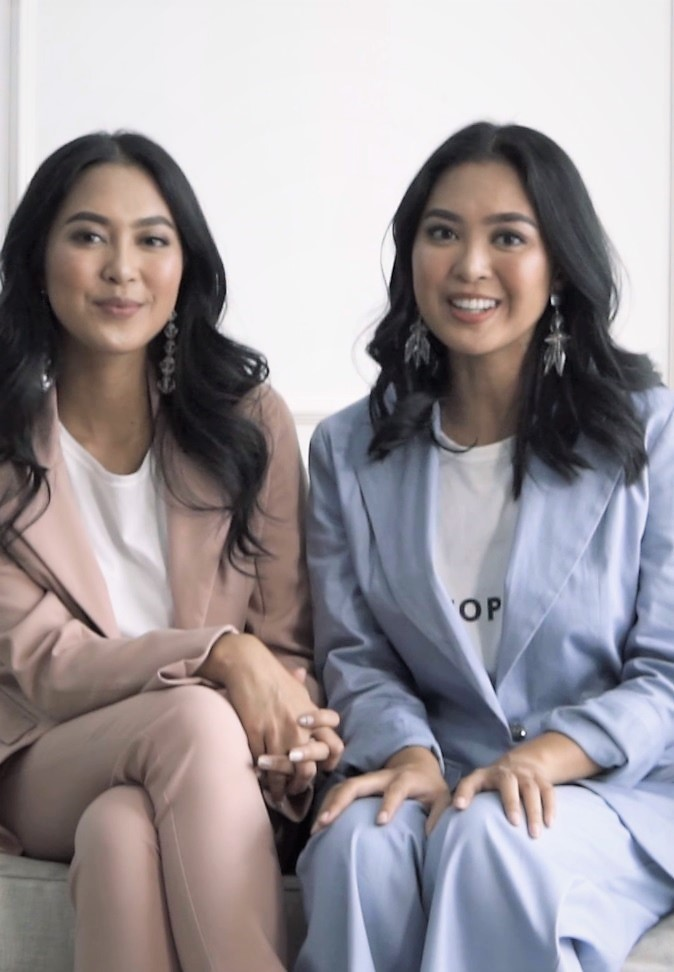
Miss Indonesia 2014
Maria Asteria Sastrayu Rahajeng,
of West Sulawesi

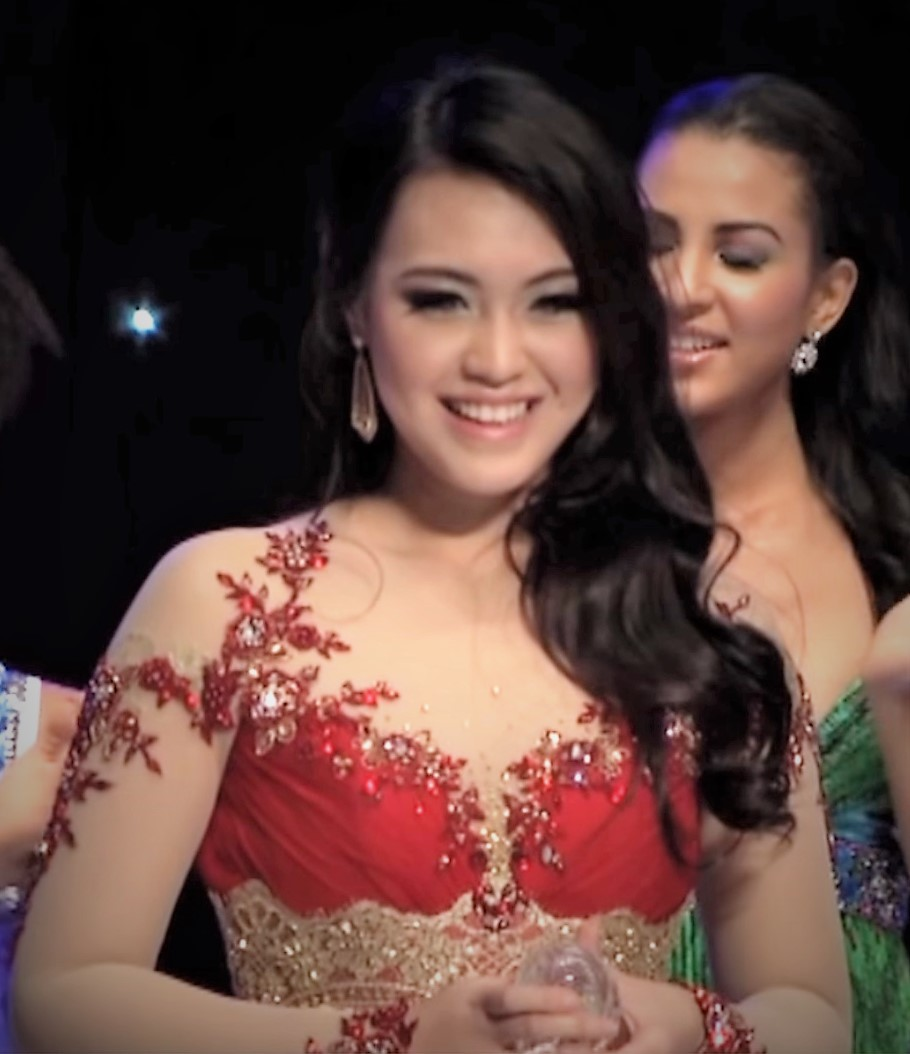
Miss Indonesia 2013
Vania Larissa Tan,
of West Kalimantan

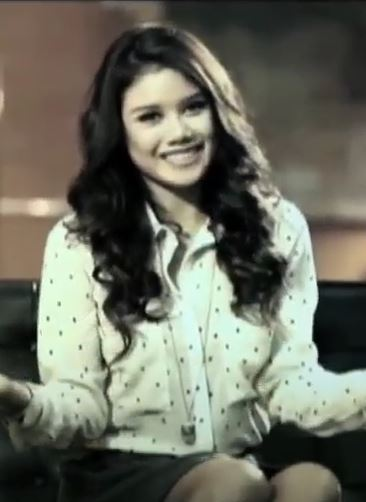
Miss Indonesia 2012
Ines Putri Tjiptadi Chandra,
of Bali

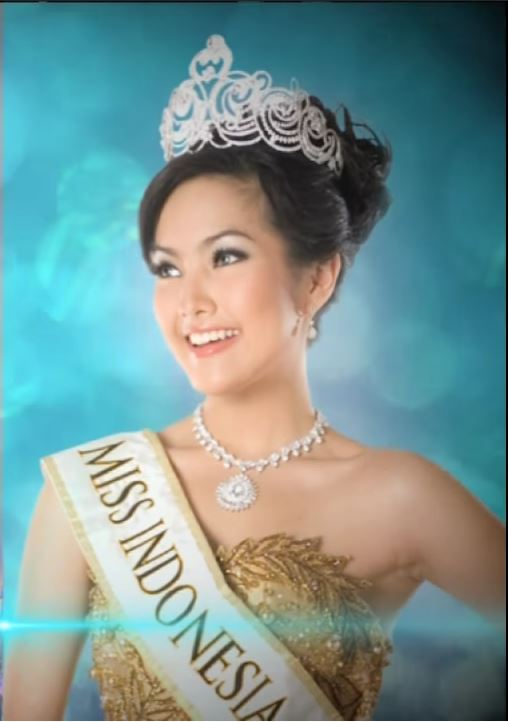
Miss Indonesia 2011
Astrid Ellena Indriana Yunadi,
of East Java

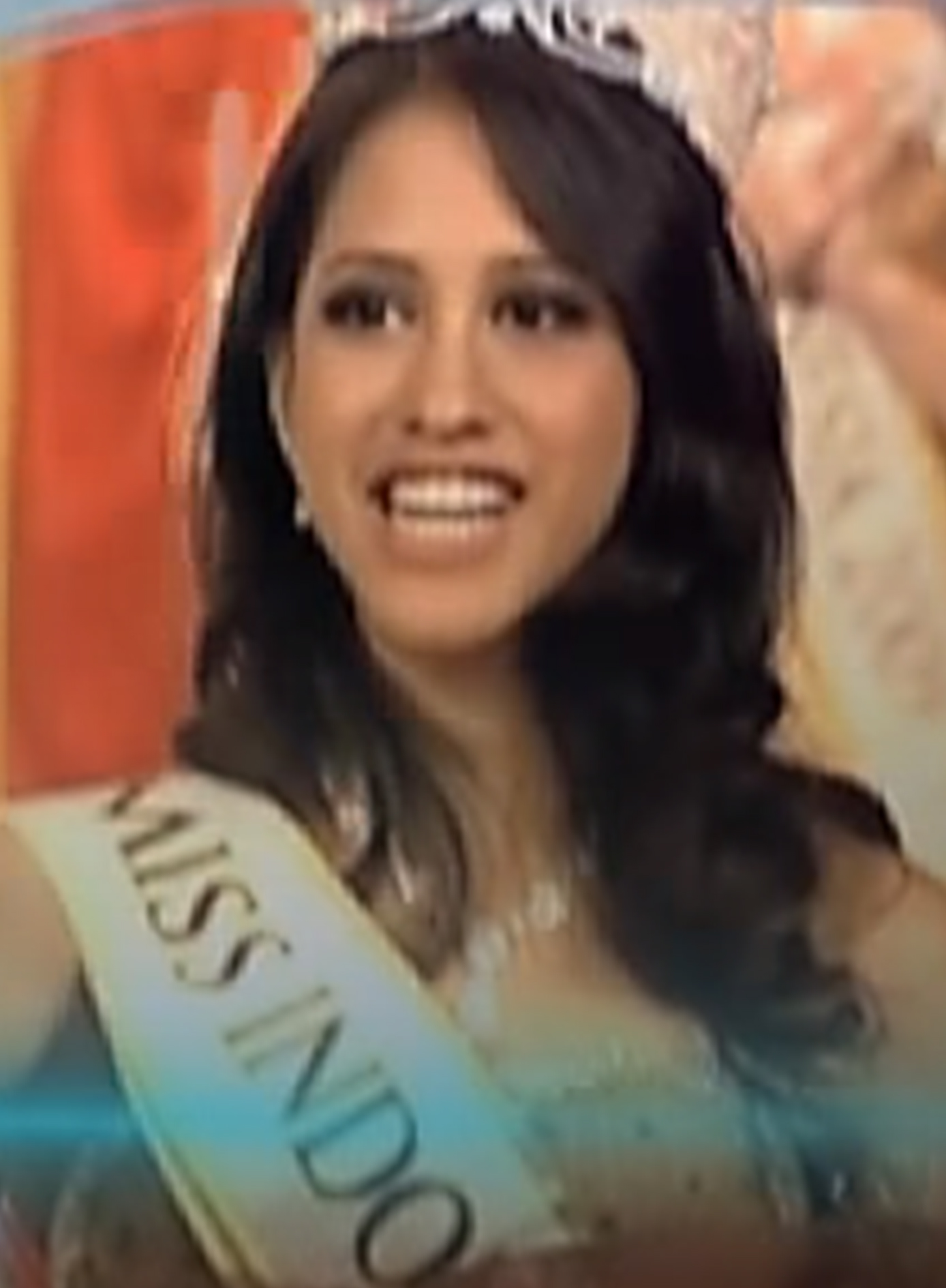
Miss Indonesia 2010
Asyifa Syafiningdyah Putrambami Latief,
of West Java

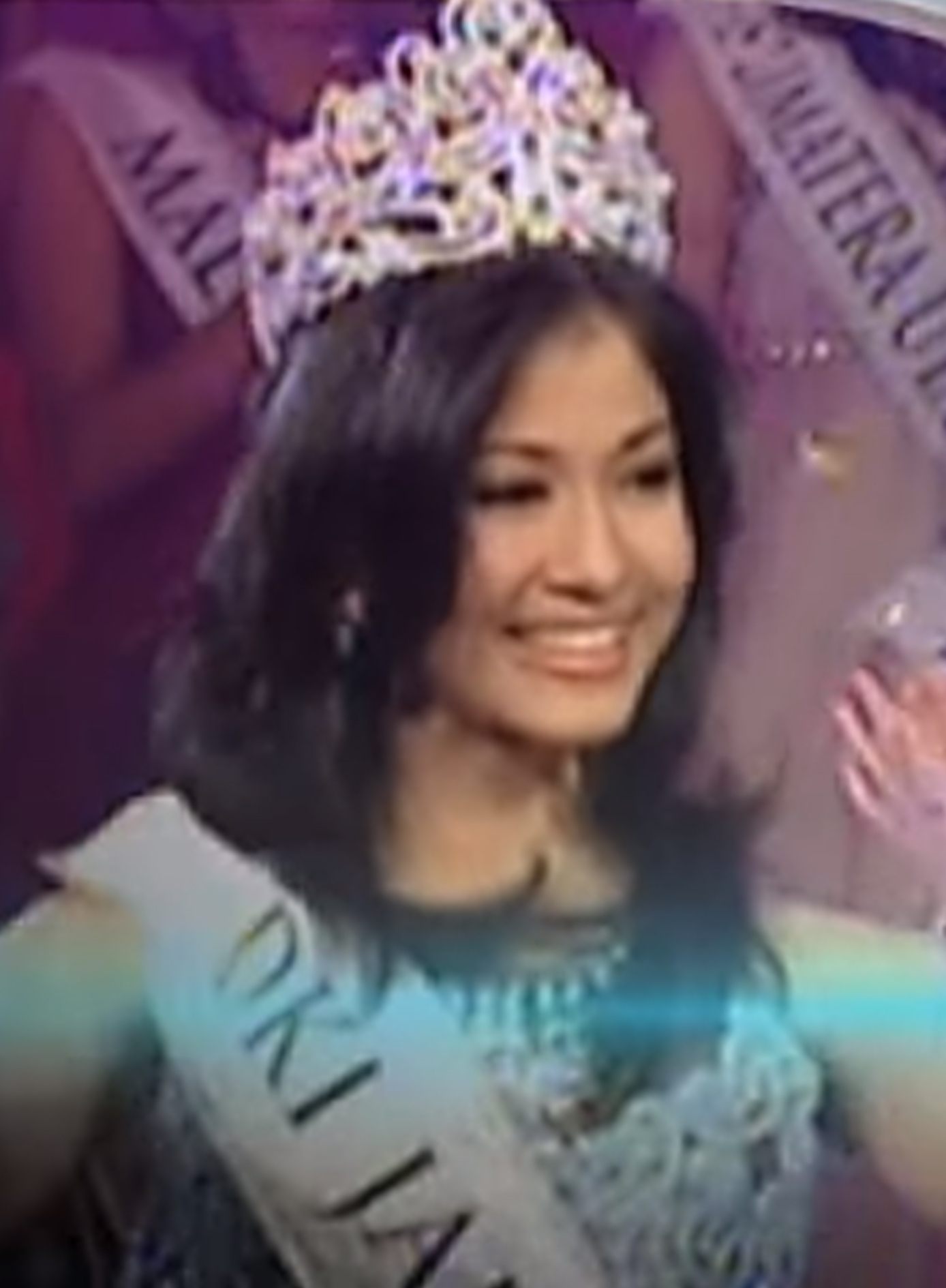
Miss Indonesia 2009
Kerenina Sunny Halim,
of Jakarta SCR

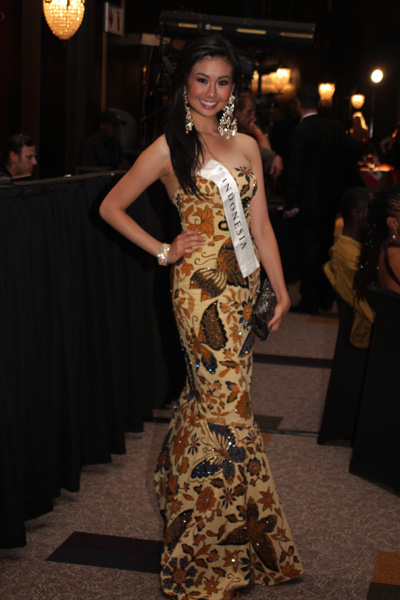
Miss Indonesia 2008
Sandra Angelia Hadisiswantoro,
of East Java

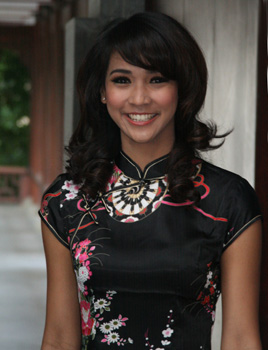
Miss Indonesia 2007
Kamidia Radisti,
of West Java

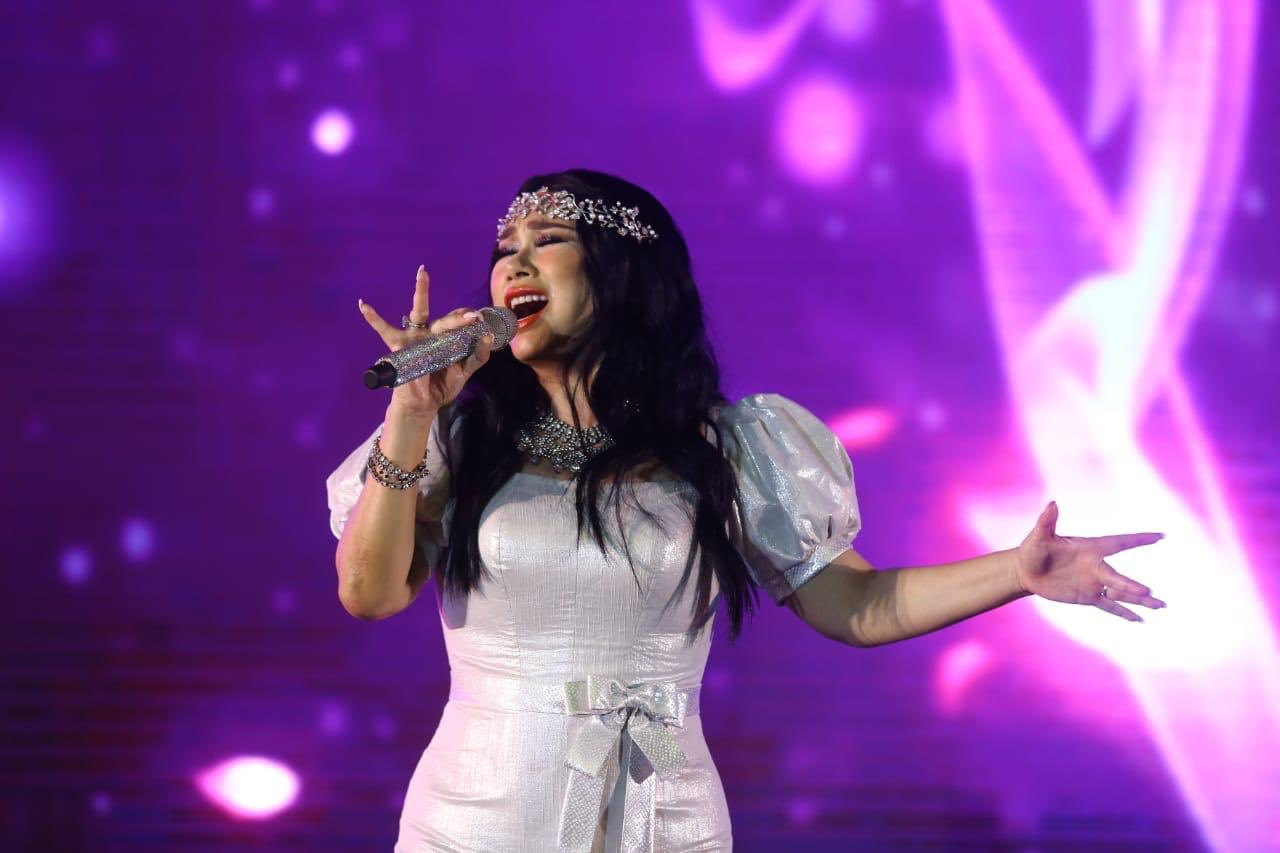
Miss Indonesia 1983
Titi Dwi Jayati,
of Jakarta

=== Number of wins by province ===
Province	Titles	Year(s)
West Java	4	2005, 2007, 2010, 2018
Jakarta SCR	2	2009, 2025
North Sulawesi	2	2006, 2022
East Java	2	2008, 2011
Central Papua	1	2026
North Sumatra	1	2024
South Sulawesi	1	2020
Jambi	1	2019
West Nusa Tenggara	1	2017
Bangka Belitung	1	2016
Special Region of Yogyakarta	1	2015
West Sulawesi	1	2014
West Kalimantan	1	2013
Bali	1	2012

== International representations ==
Color key

- : Declared as Winner
- : Ended as runner-up
- : Ended as one of the finalists or semi-finalists
- : Ended as Special awards winner

Year	Province	Miss Indonesia	International pageant	Placement	Special awards	Notes
2005	West Java	Imelda Fransisca	Miss ASEAN 2005	1st Runner-up	Miss Favorite	
2006	North Sulawesi	Kristania Virginia Besouw	Miss World 2006	Unplaced	Miss World Sport (Top 24)	
2007	West Java	Kamidia Radisti	Miss World 2007	Unplaced	Beauty With a Purpose (Top 5); Miss World Talent (Top 18)	
2008	East Java	Sandra Angelia Hadisiswantoro	Miss World 2008	Unplaced	Miss World Talent (Top 19)	
2009	Jakarta SCR	Kerenina Sunny Halim	Miss World 2009	Unplaced	Miss World Beach Beauty (Top 12); Miss World Talent (Top 19)	
2010	West Java	Asyifa Syafiningdyah Putrambami Latief	Miss World 2010	Unplaced	Miss World Talent (Top 15)	
2011	East Java	Astrid Ellena Indriana Yunadi	Miss World 2011	Top 15	Beauty With a Purpose; Miss World Talent (Top 11)	
2012	Bali	Ines Putri Tjiptadi Chandra	Miss World 2012	Top 15	Beauty With a Purpose (3rd Runner-up)	
2013	West Kalimantan	Vania Larissa Tan	Miss World 2013	Top 10	Miss World Talent; Miss World Beach Beauty (Top 11)	
2014	West Sulawesi	Maria Asteria Sastrayu Rahajeng	Miss World 2014	Top 25	Beauty With a Purpose	
2015	D.I Yogyakarta	Maria Harfanti	Miss World 2015	2nd Runner-up	Continental Queen of Beauty (Asia); Beauty With a Purpose; Miss World Talent (Top 13)	
2016	Bangka Belitung	Natasha Mannuela Halim	Miss World 2016	2nd Runner-up	Continental Queen of Beauty (Asia); Beauty With a Purpose; Miss World Top Model (1st Runner-up)	
2017	West Nusa Tenggara	Achintya Holte Nilsen	Miss World 2017	Top 10	Beauty with a Purpose; Head to Head Challenge; Miss World Multimedia (Top 10); Miss World Talent (Top 20); Miss World Top Model (Top 30); Best World Dress Designer Awards	
2018	West Java	Alya Nurshabrina Samadikun	Miss World 2018	Top 30	Beauty with a Purpose (1st Runner-up); Miss World Talent (Top 18)	
2019	Jambi	Princess Mikhaelia Audrey Megonondo	Miss World 2019	Top 40	Beauty with a Purpose (Top 10); Head to Head Challenge (Top 20); Miss World Top Model (Top 40)	
No International pageant in 2020: Miss World 2020 was not held due to the COVID-19 pandemic.
2020	South Sulawesi	Pricilia Carla Saputri Yules	Miss World 2021	Top 6	Continental Queen of Beauty (Asia & Oceania); Beauty with a Purpose (Top 28); Head to Head Challenge (Top 16); Miss World Multimedia (Top 10); Miss World Talent (Top 27)	
No International pageant in 2022: Miss World 2021 was rescheduled to 16 March 2022 due to the COVID-19 pandemic outbreak in Puerto Rico.
2022	North Sulawesi	Audrey Vanessa Susilo	Miss World 2023	Top 40	Beauty with a Purpose (Top 10); Head to Head Challenge (Top 25); Miss World Talent (2nd Runner-up); Miss World Top Model (Top 20); Miss World Sport (Top 32)	
No International pageant in 2024: Miss World 2023 was rescheduled to 9 March 2024 due to the delayment of Miss World 2021 edition, and Miss World 2023 moved to 2024 in India.
2024	North Sumatra	Monica Kezia Sembiring	Miss World 2025	Top 40	Beauty With a Purpose; Miss World Talent; Miss World Sport (Top 32)	
2025	Jakarta SCR	Audrey Bianca Callista	Miss World 2026	Top 40	Miss World Multimedia (Top 4); Miss World Top Model (Top 60)	
2026	Central Papua	Alda Callista Puteri Setiawan	Miss World 2027	TBA		

== Placements at International Pageants ==
The following are the placements of Miss Indonesia titleholders for their participation at international pageants throughout the years.

- 13 Placements at Miss World (2011–2026). The highest placements are Maria Harfanti and Natasha Mannuela Halim as 2nd Runner-up Miss World 2015 and 2016
- 1 Placement at Miss ASEAN (2005). The highest placement is Imelda Fransisca as 1st Runner-up Miss ASEAN 2015

== Controversy ==
In recent years, there has been criticism that some participants do not come from, and have never even set foot in, the area they represent. This is because Miss Indonesia auditions are generally held only in major cities, so not all regions can be represented. Potential participants may hold a sash from particular province, although they have no connection with that province.

== Miss World Indonesia Before 2006 ==
Year	Province	Miss World Indonesia	National title	Placement	Special awards	Notes
Andi Beauty Institute Jakarta / Andy Nurhayati directorship — a franchise holder to Miss World between 1982 and 1983
1982	Jakarta SCR	Andi Botenri	Miss World Indonesia 1982	Unplaced		In 1982, Andi was one the 5 winners at Miss Indonesia 1982, titled Miss World Indonesia. She also was appointed by Andi Beauty Institute Jakarta to compete at Miss Universe 1983, a year later after Miss World competition in London, England, Great Britain.
1983	Jakarta SCR	Titi Dwijayati	Miss World Indonesia 1983	Unplaced		In 1983 Titi was designated by Andi Beauty Institute Jakarta (as the national holder for Indonesia) as Miss World Indonesia 1983. She flied internationally with Andi Botenri who also competed at Miss Universe in the same year.
Did not compete between 1984—2004: There is complete disagreement about Indonesia's delivery of beauty events from the government.
Under Puteri Indonesia Organization who owned by The Royal Highest Princess Mooryati Soedibyo of Surakarta Sunanate only in 2005
2005	Yogyakarta SR	Lindi Cistia Prabha	1st Runner-up at Puteri Indonesia 2005	Unplaced		For the first time Puteri Indonesia took over the Miss World and only once in history.

== See also ==
- Miss World
- Puteri Indonesia
- Puteri Indonesia Lingkungan
- Puteri Indonesia Pariwisata
- Miss Earth Indonesia
- Miss Grand Indonesia
- Indonesia at major beauty pageants
