= Astrid Yunadi =

Miss Indonesia

Astrid Ellena
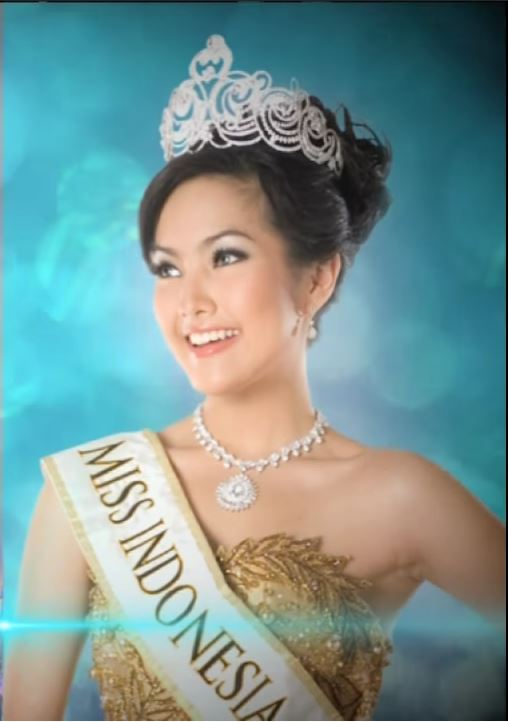
- Yunadi in a Miss Indonesia 2011 TV commercial.
- Born: Astrid Ellena Indriana Yunadi; 8 June 1990 (age 36); Surabaya, Indonesia
- Height: 1.71 m (5 ft 7 1/2 in)
- Beauty pageant titleholder
- Title: Miss Indonesia 2011; Miss World Indonesia 2011
- Hair color: black
- Eye color: brown
- Major competitions: Miss Indonesia 2011; (Winner); Miss World 2011; (Top 15)

Astrid Ellena Indriana Yunadi (born 8 June 1990), better known simply as Astrid Ellena, is an Indonesian model and beauty pageant titleholder who won Miss Indonesia 2011. She was raised in Surabaya, Indonesia and Gaithersburg, Maryland, United States.

== Early life ==
Born in Surabaya, Ellen spent her childhood in East Java. An accomplished piano player, and her school years in the United States brought her opportunities to perform live in a few places, including the US State Department. She waa an international relations student at Pelita Harapan University. She won several beauty pageants before winning Miss Indonesia in 2011, including Miss Pelita Harapan University. Yunadi was previously educated at Quince Orchard High School in Maryland, United States, graduating as a distinguished honor student.

Yunadi speaks Indonesian fluently, along with some Spanish, Mandarin, and English. She dreamed to be a diplomat in order to promote Indonesian culture to the world.

== Pageantry ==
=== Miss Indonesia 2011 ===
Astrid Ellena was crowned as Miss Indonesia 2011 on 3 June 2011, at Central Park, Jakarta. In Miss Indonesia 2011 competition she also won Miss Favorite award and Miss Beautiful Skin. She is second East Javanese to win Miss Indonesia after Sandra Angelia who won Miss Indonesia in 2008

=== Miss World 2011 ===
Astrid Ellena represented Indonesia at the Miss World 2011 Pageant in London, United Kingdom along with contestants from 113 other countries.She earned Top 15 placement as well as won the Miss World Beauty With A Purpose award along with Miss Ghana and one of the Top 10 of Miss World Talent. She was the first Indonesian to place in the semi-finalists in Miss World history.

== Personal life ==
Yunadi's relationship with her father, Fredrich Yunadi, hasn't been very harmonious, due to a conflict between the two. She was raised only by her mother, Linda Indriani Campbell, after her parents' divorce when she was three years old. According to a statement made by Campbell, Yunadi got no financial support from her father, and Campbell is the one who made it possible for Yunadi to go to school in the United States.

Astrid Yunadi's father also had conflict with her boyfriend, Donny Leimena, who has been reported to the police for defaming Fredrich as a lawyer.

Awards and achievements
Preceded by Asyifa Latief	Miss Indonesia; 2011	Succeeded by Ines Putri Tjiptadi Chandra
Preceded by Natasha Metto (Kenya)	Miss World Beauty with a Purpose; 2011	Succeeded by Vanya Mishra (India)
