= Ines Putri =

Indonesian beauty pageant titleholder (born 1989)

- Born: Ines Putri Tjiptadi Chandra; September 5, 1989 (age 37); Denpasar, Indonesia
- Occupation: Professional golfer
- Height: 1.67 m (5 ft 5 1/2 in)
- Beauty pageant titleholder
- Title: Miss Indonesia 2012; Miss World Indonesia 2012
- Hair color: Black
- Eye color: Black
- Major competitions: Miss Indonesia 2012; (Winner); Miss World 2012; (Top 15)

Ines Putri Tjiptadi Chandra (born September 5, 1989) is an Indonesian actress, model and beauty pageant titleholder who was crowned Miss Indonesia 2012, the first Balinese ever to win the pageant. She represented Indonesia at the Miss World 2012 in Ordos, Inner Mongolia, China. She also joined The Apartment (Design Your Destiny) in the 3rd Series of The Apartment. Ines Putri Tjiptadi Chandra and Jennifer Sumia were placed fifth overall, won one challenge (the Master Bathroom), at the bottom two twice (The Living Room and The Family Room challenges), and were eliminated in the Family Room Challenge.

== Early life ==
Born in Denpasar, Chandra spent her childhood on the island of Bali. She went to school at Taman Mahatma Gandhi. In 2007, she graduated from Bradenton Academy and received a scholarship from University of Georgia. She studied at the university for less than a year as a business major before postponing it to pursue a career in professional golf.

== Golf career ==
Putri is a professional golfer, winning Gold medal and Silver Medal at the 2004 Pekan Olahraga Nasional for Bali. She is the youngest person ever to compete for Indonesia National Golf Team. In 2012, however, she was crossed out from the Balinese golf team squad for 2012 Pekan Olahraga Nasional by Balinese Olympic Committee because her tenure as Miss Indonesia might cause schedule conflict with golf practice.

== Pageantry ==
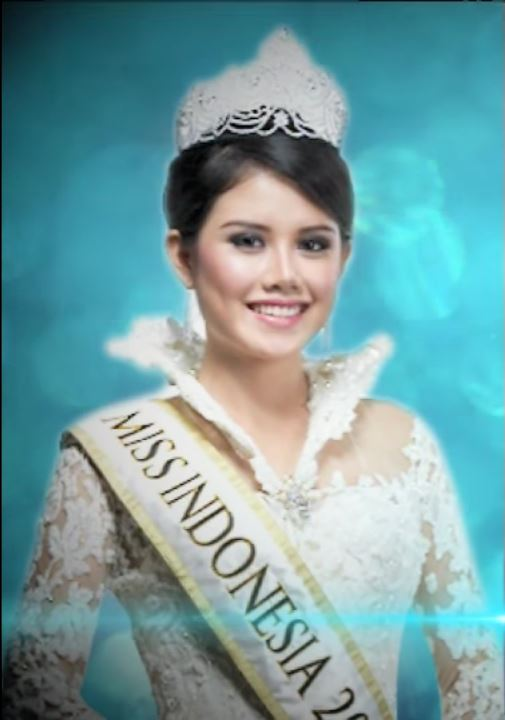
Ines Putri appear on Miss Indonesia 2012 TV-commercial.

=== Miss Indonesia 2012 ===
Putri was crowned Miss Indonesia 2012 on a final held in Jakarta on 28 April 2012. She reign until 20 February 2013 (only 1 year hold the crown) and her crown is given to Miss Indonesia 2013. Since she won Miss Indonesia, she was eligible to represent Indonesia in Miss World contest.

=== Miss World 2012 ===
Ines Putri represented Indonesia in Miss World 2012 held in Ordos, Inner Mongolia, China and made into the Top 15. This is the first time that Indonesia placed two years in a row in Miss World's history. She also made into the Top 56 in Top Model, Top 40 in Beach Fashion, and 3rd Runner-up in Beauty With A Purpose. She got 160 points for her Preliminary and was ranked 11th. She is the second Indonesian to be placed in the Top 15, the first Indonesian that made into the Top Model Event, and the second Indonesian that made into Beach Fashion Event.

== After reign ==
Ines travel to Juba, South Sudan on June 28 to become an international judge together with Miss Earth 2012 Tereza Fajksová to attend Beauties of South Sudan pageant, the most respectful pageant in South Sudan and send it winners to represent South Sudan at Miss Earth, Miss International and Miss Grand International. The event is organized by Atong Demach - who is the Miss World 2012 3rd runner up and Miss World Africa 2012. Ines and Atong are good friend since meeting in 2012 at Miss World in China and extended their friendship after the pageant. Atong went to Bali, Indonesia to visit Ines and attend her charity event and Ines visited South Sudan as well.

Awards and achievements
Preceded by Astrid Ellena Yunadi	Miss Indonesia; 2012	Succeeded by Vania Larissa
