= Imelda Fransisca =

Indonesian beauty pageant winner (born 1982)

- Born: 24 September 1982 (age 44); Bogor, Indonesia
- Education: Ohio State University, U.S.
- Occupation: Psychologist
- Spouse: Norman Edward Sebastian (m. 2007)
- Beauty pageant titleholder
- Years active: 2005–2006 (as Miss Indonesia 2005)
- Major competition: Miss Indonesia 2005

Imelda Fransisca (born 24 September 1982 in Bogor, West Java) was the first Miss Indonesia in 2005. She went on to compete in the Miss ASEAN 2005 pageant, where she was the first runner up.

She also wrote a motivational book titled You Can Be Anything and Make Changes (2006) where she discussed abuse she suffered as a child in Singapore. Her only "friend" during that ordeal became food, and she became somewhat overweight, but later lost the weight due to anorexia. She attended college at Ohio State University in the United States and graduated in 2004.

After the 2004 Indian Ocean earthquake and tsunami, Fransisca accompanied Miss World 2004, Maria Julia Mantilla Garcia, Eric Tsang, and Jackie Chan to visit hard hit areas of Sumatra.

Awards and achievements
New title	Miss Indonesia; 2005	Succeeded by Kristania Virginia Besouw
