= List of Indonesians =

List of notable people from Indonesia

The following is a list of Indonesians.

== Academics ==
- Arief Budiman, sociologist, brother of Soe Hok Gie, professor at the University of Melbourne, formerly at Satya Wacana Christian University
- Azyumardi Azra
- Djoehana Wiradikarta
- Firmanzah
- Florentinus Gregorius Winarno, food scientist
- Jawahir Thontowi
- Leo Suryadinata
- Luthfi Assyaukanie
- Ong Hok Ham, one of the leading experts on Indonesian history during the 19th century Dutch colonial rule
- Pantur Silaban
- Samaun Samadikun
- Sunaryati Hartono
- Winai Dahlan, founder Director of the Halal Science Center Chulalongkorn University
- Yohanes Surya

== Arts and entertainment ==
=== Arts ===
- Affandi
- Asep Sunandar Sunarya
- Basuki Abdullah
- Kartika Affandi-Koberl
- Marina Joesoef, painter and photographer
- Raden Saleh
- Tio Tjay
- Desmonda Cathabel, West End Performer

=== Dance ===
- Freya Jayawardana, singer and dancer
- Gusmiati Suid (1942–2001), choreographer
- Nun Zairina (1932–2007), dancer, actress, model, and dance instructor

=== Film ===
- Oka Antara, actor
- Abimana Aryasatya, actor and film producer
- Acha Septriasa, actress
- Asrul Sani, writer, poet and screenwriter
- Ateng, actor, comedian
- Barry Prima, actor
- Bing Slamet, actor
- Bunga Citra Lestari, actress, singer
- Camelia Malik, actress
- Chelsea Islan, actress
- Christine Hakim, actress
- Deddy Mizwar, actor and film director
- Dian Sastrowardoyo, actress
- Famke Janssen (quarter-Indonesian)
- Garin Nugroho, film director
- Ian Gouw, Chinese-Indonesian descent Hong Kong actor and model
- Iko Uwais, actor
- Imelda Therinne, actress
- Jajang C. Noer, actress
- Joe Taslim, actor
- Joko Anwar, film director
- Julie Estelle, actress
- Julyana Soelistyo, American stage and film actress
- Laudya Cynthia Bella, actress
- Lo Lieh, Indonesian-born Hong Kong actor
- Meriam Bellina, actress
- Mimi Mariani, actress
- Nadia Saphira, actress, model, lawyer
- Nia Dinata, film director
- Nicholas Saputra, actor
- Nirina Zubir, actress, presenter
- Nora Samosir (half-Indonesian), Singaporean actress
- Pierre Coffin (half Indonesian), French co-director of Despicable Me
- Prisia Nasution, actress
- Rano Karno, actor, politician
- Revalina Sayuthi Temat, actress
- Reza Rahadian, actor
- Rianti Cartwright, actress, presenter
- Ruth Pelupessy, actress
- Sjumandjaja, director, screenwriter, and actor
- Soekarno M. Noer, actor
- Sophan Sophiaan, actor
- Sophia Latjuba (half-Indonesian), actress
- Suzzanna, actress
- Tania Gunadi, actress
- Timo Tjahjanto, director, producer, writer
- Tio Pakusadewo, actor
- Titi Kamal, actress
- Titi Rajo Bintang, actress, drummer
- Titien Sumarni, actress and producer
- Tuti Indra Malaon, actress
- Tora Sudiro, actor
- Usmar Ismail, film director
- Wim Umboh, film director

=== Music ===
- Stephen Tong, pastor, music director and principal conductor, Indonesian evangelist.
- Eunice Tong, Indonesian Women Conductor, Conductor of Jakarta Simfonia Orchestra, Main Conductor of G20 Bali Summit in 2022
- Rebecca Tong, Indonesian Women Conductor, First Prize Winner of the inaugural La Maestra competition in 2020, held in Paris
- Daniel Adams-Ray, Swedish rapper, singer of Indonesian descent
- Ebiet G. Ade, country singer
- Wisnu Witono Adhi, Norwegian Idol finalist
- Afgan, pop singer
- Vidi Aldiano, singer
- Joey Alexander, pianist
- Ahmad Albar, rock singer
- Haddad Alwi, nasheed singer
- Amara, singer-songwriter
- Tiara Andini, singer, runner up Indonesian Idol season 10
- Raisa Andriana, singer
- Anggun
- Ian Antono, guitarist, songwriter
- Anan Anwar (half-Indonesian)
- Joni Anwar (half-Indonesian)
- Nicky Astria, singer
- Nicole Zefanya (Niki), singer
- Nike Ardilla, singer
- Nowela Elizabeth Auparay, winner of the seventh season of Indonesian Idol, singer
- Carmit Bachar (quarter-Indonesian), singer
- Michelle Branch (quarter-Indonesian), singer, musician
- Adia Chan, Chinese-Indonesian Hong Kong actress, singer, model, and spokesperson
- Rich Brian, rapper
- Chrisye
- Inul Daratista, dangdut singer
- Rumi Haitami, singer-songwriter
- Dewiq, singer-songwriter
- Ahmad Dhani, rock musician
- Angger Dimas, DJ
- Hetty Koes Endang
- Maia Estianty
- Iwan Fals, singer
- Glenn Fredly, pop R&B singer-songwriter
- Giring Ganesha
- Melly Goeslaw, singer-songwriter
- Erwin Gutawa
- Gita Gutawa, singer-songwriter, actress
- Eduardus Halim, American pianist of Chinese-Indonesian descent
- Berlian Hutauruk
- Rhoma Irama, dangdut singer-songwriter
- Nazril Irham, singer, vocalist of Noah
- Audy Item
- Mulan Jameela, singer
- Januarisman, winner of the fifth season of Indonesian Idol, rock singer
- Iwa K, rapper
- Lala Karmela
- Tonny Koeswoyo
- Krisdayanti, singer
- Lee Kum-Sing, classical pianist
- Indra Lesmana, jazz pianist
- Reza Ningtyas Lindh, Swedish Idol finalist
- Fatin Shidqia Lubis, winner of the first season of X Factor Indonesia
- A. T. Mahmud
- Dougy Mandagi, vocals and guitar with The Temper Trap
- Gesang Martohartono, Keroncong composer, songwriter of the famous song "Bengawan Solo"
- Jessica Mauboy, runner-up of the fourth season of Australian Idol, Australian r&b singer of Indonesian descent
- Once Mekel
- Poppy Mercury, singer
- Agnez Mo, R&B singer and dancer
- Frans Mohede, singer
- Mike Mohede, winner of the second season of Indonesian Idol, soul and gospel singer
- Addie MS
- Fariz Rustam Munaf
- Sherina Munaf, actress, singer-songwriter
- Taco Ockerse, singer
- Vina Panduwinata
- Eric Papilaya, Eurovision Song Contest 2007 representative of Austria
- Dewi Persik
- Indah Dewi Pertiwi
- Broery Pesulima, singer-songwriter
- Titiek Puspa, singer-songwriter, actress
- Rainych
- Bebi Romeo, singer-songwriter
- Rossa, singer
- Darian Sahanaja, singer-songwriter
- Ruth Sahanaya, singer
- Daniel Sahuleka (half-Indonesian), musician and singer
- Badut Salamun, singer, clown, social media personality
- Isyana Sarasvati
- Citra Scholastika
- Elfa Secioria
- Shae, singer
- Yuni Shara, singer
- Putri Ayu Silaen, soprano singer
- Wibi Soerjadi, pianist
- Sandhy Sondoro, singer
- Raden Ajeng Srimulat, Keroncong singer and comedian
- Dira Sugandi, jazz singer
- Elvy Sukaesih
- Mbah Surip, reggae singer
- Aubrey Suwito, Malaysian pianist, keyboardist, songwriter of Indonesian descent
- Terry, singer
- Ayu Tingting, dangdut singer
- Goh Soon Tioe (quarter-Indonesian), key player in the development of classical music for post-war Singapore
- Titi DJ, singer
- Joy Tobing, winner of the first season of Indonesian Idol, singer
- Trie Utami, jazz singer
- Alex Van Halen (quarter-Indonesian), member of the rock group Van Halen
- Eddie Van Halen (quarter-Indonesian), member of the rock group Van Halen
- Armand Van Helden (quarter Indonesian), DJ
- Hendry Wijaya, pianist
- Kuei Pin Yeo, pianist
- Wayan Yudane, gangsa player and an exponent of Balinese music in New Zealand
- Catalina Yue (quarter-Indonesian), Canadian-American actress, singer
- Yura Yunita, singer

=== Television ===
- Raffi Ahmad, actor, presenter, TV personality, comedian
- Rachel Amanda, actress
- Sutan Amrull, American-Indonesian TV personality, makeup artist, drag performer
- Lulu Antariksa (half-Indonesian), American actress, singer
- Tukul Arwana, host of talk show Bukan Empat Mata
- Indy Barends, presenter
- Basuki, member of traditional comedy group Srimulat
- Indra Birowo, actor, comedian
- Billy Chong, actor
- Sandra Dewi, actress, TV personality
- Dorce Gamalama, trans woman pop singer, actress, presenter, and comedian
- Mark-Paul Gosselaar (quarter-Indonesian), American actor
- Tania Gunadi, American actress of Chinese-Indonesian descent
- Donna Harun (half-Indonesian), actress, presenter, TV personality
- Dude Harlino, actor
- Jojon, comedian
- Kristin Kreuk (half-Indonesian), Canadian actress
- Daniel Mananta, presenter
- Marshanda, actress, singer
- Amelia Natasha, presenter
- Soimah Pancawati, traditional singer and performer, comedian
- Julia Perez, comedian, actress, singer
- Nia Ramadhani, actress, socialite
- Olla Ramlan, actress, presenter, socialite, TV personality
- Feni Rose, presenter
- Evan Sanders, actor, presenter
- Alyssa Soebandono, actress
- Benyamin Sueb, actor, comedian, film director and singer
- Sule, comedian
- Alin Sumarwata (half-Indonesian), Australian actress
- Shireen Sungkar, actress
- Olga Syahputra, comedian
- Syahrini, TV personality, singer, socialite
- Aliando Syarief, actor
- Mikha Tambayong, actress, model
- Chelsea Olivia Wijaya (half-Indonesian), actress
- Nikita Willy, actress
- Rini Wulandari, winner of the fourth season of Indonesian Idol, singer
- Tantowi Yahya, presenter
- Rissanda Putri Tuarissa, actress and member of JKT48

== Business and economics ==
=== Business people ===
- Aburizal Bakrie
- Ciputra
- Erick Thohir
- Setiawan Djody
- Batara Eto
- Rachman Halim
- Michael Bambang Hartono
- Robert Budi Hartono
- Bob Hasan
- Dahlan Iskan
- Abdul Latief
- Prajogo Pangestu
- Probosutedjo
- Raam Punjabi
- James Riady
- Mochtar Riady
- Bob Sadino
- Sudono Salim (Liem Sioe Liong)
- Anthoni Salim (Liem Hong Sien)
- Michael Joseph Sampoerna
- Putera Sampoerna
- Jaka Singgih
- Martua Sitorus
- William Soeryadjaya
- Tommy Suharto
- Jaya Suprana
- Djoko Susanto
- Sehat Sutardja
- Tan Khoen Swie
- Dato Sri Tahir
- Chairul Tanjung
- Hary Tanoesoedibjo
- Sukanto Tanoto
- Sandiaga Salahudin Uno
- Jusuf Wanandi (Liem Bian Kie)
- Eka Tjipta Widjaja
- Fuganto Widjaja
- Tomy Winata
- Surya Wonowidjojo
- Susilo Wonowidjojo

=== Business executives ===
- Karen Agustiawan
- Betti Alisjahbana
- Rinaldi Firmansyah
- Ibnu Sutowo

=== Economists ===
- Armida Alisjahbana, State Minister for National Development Planning (2009-2014)
- J. Soedradjad Djiwandono, Governor of Bank of Indonesia (1993-1998)
- Sumitro Djojohadikusumo, Minister of Industry and Trade (1950-1951) and Minister of Finance (1952-1953)
- Kwik Kian Gie, Coordinating Minister for Economics and Finance (1999-2000)
- Sri Mulyani Indrawati, Minister of Finance (2016–present) and Managing Director of the World Bank Group (2010-2016)
- Agus Martowardojo, Minister of Finance (2010-2013) and Governor of Bank of Indonesia (2013)
- Darmin Nasution, Governor of Bank of Indonesia (2010-2013)
- Widjojo Nitisastro, Coordinating Minister for Economics, Finance and Industry (1973-1983)
- Mari Pangestu, Minister of Trade (2004-2011)
- Radius Prawiro, Governor of Bank of Indonesia (1966-1968), Minister of Trade (1973-1983), Minister of Finance (1983-1988)
- Rizal Ramli, Coordinating Minister for Economics (2000-2001) and Minister of Finance (2001)
- Syahril Sabirin, Governor of Bank Indonesia (1999-2003)
- Emil Salim
- Hadi Soesastro, economist and political scientist (international relations)
- Syahrir, Economic Adviser in the Council of Presidential Advisers of Susilo Bambang Yudhoyono (2007-2008)
- Gita Wirjawan, Minister of Trade (2011-2014) and the founder of Ancora Group and Ancora Foundation

== Crime ==
- Reynhard Sinaga, serial rapist and most prolific rapist in English legal history
- Sundarti Supriyanto, domestic maid and victim of maid abuse who killed her abusive employer Angie Ng in Singapore, and also Ng's daughter Crystal Poh
- Daryati, Indonesian maid sentenced to life imprisonment for murdering her employer Seow Kim Choo in Singapore
- Purwanti Parji, Indonesian maid who killed her employer’s mother-in-law Har Chit Heang
- Juminem and Siti Aminah, two Indonesian maids responsible for the killing of their employer Esther Ang
- Dewi Sukowati, who was jailed for killing her Singaporean employer Nancy Gan in 2014
- Barokah, who was jailed for life for killing her employer Wee Keng Wah in 2005

== Fashion ==
=== Fashion designers ===
- Anne Avantie
- Sebastian Gunawan
- Didit Hediprasetyo
- Asha Smara Darra
- Obin
- Tex Saverio
- Auguste Soesastro
- Iwan Tirta
- Biyan Wanaatmadja

=== Fashion models ===
- Mesty Ariotedjo, medical doctor, harpist, model and socialite
- Ayu Gani, winner of Asia's Next Top Model (cycle 3)
- Nadya Hutagalung (half-Indonesian), model
- Luna Maya, model, actress
- Jodi Ann Paterson (half-Indonesian), Playboy Playmate
- Manohara Odelia Pinot
- Mariana Renata (half-Indonesian), model

=== Pageant winners ===
==== Puteri Indonesia (Miss Indonesia Universe) ====
- Nadine Ames (2011)
- Frederika Alexis Cull (2019)
- Nadine Chandrawinata (2005)
- Artika Sari Devi (2004)
- Elvira Devinamira (2014)
- Whulandary Herman (2013)
- Agni Kuswardono (2006)
- Maria Selena Nurcahya (2009)
- Putri Raemawasti (2007)
- Qory Sandioriva (2010)
- Zivanna Letisha Siregar (2008)
- Kezia Warouw (2016)

==== Miss Indonesia (Miss Indonesia World) ====
- Sandra Angelia (2008)
- Kristania Virginia Besouw (2006)
- Imelda Fransisca (2005)
- Karenina Sunny Halim (2009)
- Maria Harfanti (2015)
- Vania Larissa (2013)
- Asyifa Latief (2010)
- Ines Putri (2012)
- Kamidia Radisti (2007)
- Maria Asteria Sastrayu Rahajeng (2014)
- Astrid Yunadi (2011)

==== Miss Indonesia Earth ====
- Annisa Ananda Nusyirwan (2014)
- Nita Sofiani (2013)

==== Miss Indonesia International ====
- Kevin Lilliana Miss International 2017
- Jolene Marie Cholock-Rotinsulu (2019)
- Chintya Fabyola (2015)
- Reisa Kartikasari (2011)
- Marisa Sartika Maladewi (2013)
- Liza Elly Purnamasari (2012)
- Elfin Rappa (2014)

== Journalism and writing ==
- Djamaluddin Adinegoro, journalist in the colonial era
- Sutan Takdir Alisjahbana
- Svida Alisjahbana, President and CEO of Femina Magazine
- Desi Anwar
- Rosihan Anwar, founder of Siasat magazine and Pedoman newspaper
- Iksaka Banu
- Thio Tjin Boen, writer of Malay-language fiction and a journalist
- Lauw Giok Lan, journalist and one of the founders of Sin Po newspaper
- Ernest Douwes Dekker
- Nirwan Dewanto, poet, cultural critic
- Guru Gembul, activist, critic, teacher, and content creator
- Ahmadun Yosi Herfanda, arts editor
- Andrea Hirata, novelist
- Ani Idrus, founder of Waspada daily newspaper
- Kho Ping Hoo, author of Chinese ethnicity
- Kwee Tek Hoay, Chinese-Indonesian Malay-language writer of novels and drama, journalist
- Haris Jauhari, journalist
- Dewi Lestari
- Pramoedya Ananta Toer
- Putra Nababan
- Budi Putra, technology journalist
- Rahadyan Sastrowardoyo, editor and photographer
- Atika Shubert
- Najwa Shihab

== Law ==
- Basrief Arief
- Jimly Asshiddiqie
- Luthfi Dahlan
- Albertina Ho
- Hotman Paris Hutapea
- Tjung Tin Jan
- Todung Mulya Lubis
- Mohammad Mahfud
- Wirjono Prodjodikoro
- Abraham Samad
- Bismar Siregar
- Hendarman Supandji
- Hamdan Zoelva
- Haswandi
- Artidjo Alkostar
- Melki Sedek Huang
- Mutiara Baswedan

== Military ==
- Muhammad Ali
- Mohammad Nazir Isa
- Abdul Rasyid Kacong
- Yudo Margono
- Marsetio
- R.E. Martadinata
- Mas Pardi
- Tedjo Edhy Purdijatno
- R. Soebijakto
- Slamet Soebijanto
- Soedomo
- Agus Suhartono
- Sumardjono
- Ade Supandi
- Widodo Adi Sutjipto
- Gina Yoginda

== National Heroes ==
- Abdul Halim
- Abdul Haris Nasution
- Adam Malik
- Agus Salim
- Ahmad Yani
- Bagindo Azizchan
- Bung Tomo
- Cut Nyak Dhien
- Fatmawati
- Gatot Soebroto
- Halim Perdanakusuma
- Hamengkubuwono I
- Hamengkubuwono IX
- Hasyim Asy'ari
- I Gusti Ngurah Rai
- John Lie Tjeng Tjoan
- Kartini
- Katamso Darmokusumo
- Mohammad Hatta
- Mohammad Husni Thamrin
- Mohammad Natsir
- Mohammad Yamin
- Sam Ratulangi
- Siti Hartinah
- Soekarno
- Sutan Sjahrir
- Wahid Hasyim
- Wahidin Soedirohoesodo
- Frans Kaisiepo

== Politicians and administrators ==
=== Presidents ===
- Soekarno, 1st President of Indonesia (1945-1967)
- Assaat, Provisional President of Republic of Indonesia (1949-1950)
- Soeharto, 2nd President of Indonesia (1967-1998)
- BJ Habibie, 3rd President of Indonesia (1998-1999)
- Abdurrahman Wahid, 4th President of Indonesia (1999-2001)
- Megawati Soekarnoputri, 5th President of Indonesia (2001-2004)
- Susilo Bambang Yudhoyono, 6th President of Indonesia (2004-2014)
- Joko Widodo, 7th President of Indonesia (2014-2024)
- Prabowo Subianto, 8th President of Indonesia (Since 2024)

=== Spouses of Presidents ===
- Fatmawati, wife of Soekarno (1945-1967)
- Siti Hartinah, wife of Soeharto (1967-1998)
- Hasri Ainun Habibie, wife of BJ Habibie (1998-1999)
- Sinta Nuriyah, wife of Abdurrahman Wahid (1999-2001)
- Taufiq Kiemas, husband of Megawati Soekarnoputri (2001-2004)
- Kristiani Herrawati, wife of Susilo Bambang Yudhoyono (2004-2014)
- Iriana Joko Widodo, wife of Joko Widodo (since 2014)

=== Vice-Presidents ===
- Mohammad Hatta, 1st Vice-President of Indonesia (1945-1956)
- Adam Malik, 3rd Vice-President of Indonesia (1978-1983)
- Umar Wirahadikusumah, 4th Vice-President of Indonesia (1983-1988)
- Sudharmono, 5th Vice-President of Indonesia (1988-1993)
- Try Sutrisno, 6th Vice-President of Indonesia (1993-1998)
- Hamzah Haz, 9th Vice-President of Indonesia (2001-2004)
- Jusuf Kalla, 10th and 12th Vice-President of Indonesia (2004-2009 & 2014-2019)
- Boediono, 11th Vice-President of Indonesia (2009-2014)
- Gibran Rakabuming Raka, 14th Vice-President of Indonesia (Since 2024)

=== Prime Ministers ===
- Sutan Sjahrir, 1st Prime Minister of Indonesia (1945-1947)
- Amir Sjarifuddin, 2nd Prime Minister of Indonesia (1947-1948)
- Abdul Halim, 4th Prime Minister of Indonesia (1950)
- Muhammad Natsir, 5th Prime Minister of Indonesia (1950-1951)
- Soekiman Wirjosandjojo, 6th Prime Minister of Indonesia (1951-1952)
- Wilopo, 7th Prime Minister of Indonesia (1952-1953)
- Ali Sastroamidjojo, 8th Prime Minister of Indonesia (1953-1955 & 1956-1957)
- Burhanuddin Harahap, 9th Prime Minister of Indonesia (1955-1956)
- Djuanda Kartawidjaja, 10th Prime Minister of Indonesia (1957-1959)

=== Government Ministers ===
- Ruslan Abdulgani, Minister of Foreign Affairs (1956-1957) & Minister of Information (1963-1964)
- Azwar Abubakar, Minister of Administrative Reform (2011-2014)
- Amirmachmud, Minister of Home Affairs of the Republic of Indonesia (1969-1983)
- Anton Apriantono, Minister of Agriculture (2004-2009)
- Cosmas Batubara, State Minister of Public Housing (1978-1988) & Minister of Labor (1988-1993)
- Bachtiar Chamsyah, Minister of Social (2001-2009)
- Adhyaksa Dault, Minister Youth and Sports (2004-2009)
- Jusman Syafii Djamal, Minister of Transportation (2007-2009)
- Agum Gumelar, Minister of Transportation (1999-2001 & 2001-2004), Minister of Defense (2001) & Coordinating Minister for Politic, Social and Security (2001)
- Soedarsono Hadisapoetro, Minister of Agriculture (1978-1983)
- Mohamad Suleman Hidayat, Minister of Industry (2009-2014)
- Fahmi Idris, Minister of Labour and Transmigration (1998-1999 & 2004-2005) & Minister of Industry (2005-2009)
- Malam Sambat Kaban, Minister of Forestry (2004-2009)
- Kusmayanto Kadiman, Minister of Research and Technology (2004-2009)
- Ginandjar Kartasasmita, Minister of Energy And Mineral Resources (1988-1993)& Coordinating Minister for Economics, Finance and Industry (1998 & 1998-1999)
- Agung Laksono, Minister Youth and Sports (2012-2013), Minister of Religious Affairs (2014) & Coordinating Minister for People's Welfare (2009-2014)
- Yusril Ihza Mahendra, Minister of Justice and Human Rights (1999-2001), Minister of Law (2001-2004) and Minister of State Secretary (2004-2007)
- Nabiel Makarim, State Minister of Environment (2001-2004)
- Susi Pudjiastuti, Minister of Maritime Affairs and Fisheries (since 2014)
- Hatta Rajasa, State Minister of Research and Technology (2001-2004), Minister of Transportation (2004-2007), Minister of State Secretary (2007-2009), Coordinating Minister for Economics (2009-2014)
- Chaerul Saleh, Minister of Energy and Mineral Resources (1959-1964) & Minister of Industry (1960-1964)
- Juwono Sudarsono, State Minister of Environment (1998), Minister of National Education (1998-1999) & Minister of Defence (1999-2000 & 2004-2009)
- Suharna Surapranata, Minister of Research and Technology of Indonesia (2009-2011)
- Djoko Suyanto, Coordinating Minister for Politic, Law and Security (2009-2014)
- Tarmizi Taher, Minister of Religious Affairs (1993-1998)
- Akbar Tanjung, Minister of Youth and Sports (1988-1993), State Minister for Public Housing (1993-1998) & Minister of State Secretary (1998-1999)
- Jero Wacik, Minister of Culture and Tourism (2004-2011) & Minister of Energy and Mineral Resources (2011-2014)
- Wiranto, Minister of Defense and Security (1998-1999) & Coordinating Minister for Politic, Law and Security (1999-2000, 2016-)
- Rachmat Witoelar, State Minister of Environment (2004-2009)
- Arief Yahya, Minister of Tourism (since 2014)
- Muhammad Yamin, Minister of Justice (1951-1952), Minister of Education (1953-1955) & Minister of Information (1962)

=== Diplomats ===
- Achmad Soebardjo, Minister of Foreign Affairs of Indonesia (1945 - 1945 & 1951-1952)
- Adam Malik, Minister of Foreign Affairs of Indonesia (1966-1978)
- Ali Alatas, Minister of Foreign Affairs of Indonesia (1988-1999)
- Nicholas Tandi Dammen, Indonesian Ambassador to the South Korea (since 2009)
- Hartono Rekso Dharsono, 1st Secretary General of the ASEAN (1976-1978)
- Dino Patti Djalal, Indonesian Ambassador to the United States (2010-2013)
- Marty Natalegawa, Minister of Foreign Affairs (2009-2014)
- Agus Salim, Minister of Foreign Affairs of Indonesia (1947-1949)
- Sunario Sastrowardoyo, Minister of Foreign Affairs of Indonesia (1957-1959)
- Alwi Shihab, Minister of Foreign Affairs of Indonesia (1999-2001)
- Hassan Wirajuda, Minister of Foreign Affairs of Indonesia (2001-2009)
- Retno Marsudi, Minister of Foreign Affairs of Indonesia (since 2014)

=== Province Governors ===
- Mustafa Abubakar, Governor of Aceh (2004-2007)
- Eko Maulana Ali, Governor of Bangka Belitung (2007-2013)
- Azwar Anas, Governor of West Sumatra (1977-1987)
- Dewa Made Beratha, Governor of Bali (1998-2008)
- Daud Beureu'eh, Governor of Aceh (1945-1953)
- Ratu Atut Chosiyah, Governor of Banten (2007-2014)
- Teuku Muhammad Hasan, Governor of Sumatra (1945-1949)
- Ahmad Heryawan, Governor of West Java (since 2009)
- Cornelis M.H., Governor of West Kalimantan (since 2008)
- Ben Mboi, Governor of East Nusa Tenggara (1978-1988)
- Rizal Nurdin, Governor of North Sumatra (1998-2005)
- Basuki Tjahaja Purnama, Governor of Jakarta (2014-2017)
- Djarot Saiful Hidayat Governor of Jakarta (2017)
- Ali Sadikin, Governor of Jakarta (1966-1977)
- José Abílio Osório Soares, Governor of East Timor (1992-1999)
- Sutiyoso, Governor of Jakarta (1997-2007)
- Hamengkubuwana IX, Governor of Yogyakarta (1945-1988)
- Irwandi Yusuf, Governor of Aceh (2007-2012)
- Anies Rasyid Baswedan, Governor of Jakarta (since 2017)
- Hamengkubuwana X, Governor of Yogyakarta (since 1998)
- Ganjar Pranowo, Governor of Central Java (2013-2023)
- Joko Widodo, Governor of Jakarta (2012-2014)
- Hasan Basri Durin Governor of West Sumatra (1987-1997)
- Fauzi Bowo, Governor of Jakarta (2007-2012)
- Gamawan Fauzi, Governor of West Sumatra (2005-2009)
- Rano Karno, Governor of Banten (2014-2017)
- Irwan Prayitno, Governor of West Sumatra (since 2016)
- Paku Alam VIII, Governor of Yogyakarta (1988-1998)
- Soekarwo, Governor of East Java (2014-2019)
- Rusli Habibie, Governor of Gorontalo (since 2012-2022)
- Olly Dondokambey, Governor of North Sulawesi (2016-2025)
- Awang Faroek Ishak, Governor of East Kalimantan (since 2008-2018)
- Muhammad Zainul Majdi, Governor of West Nusa Tenggara (since 2008)
- Sam Ratulangi, Governor of Sulawesi (1945-1949)
- El Tari, Governor of East Nusa Tenggara (1966-1978)
- Sutan Mohammad Amin Nasution, Governor of North Sumatra (1948), (1953-1956), Governor of Riau (1958-1960)
- Wan Abubakar, Governor of Riau (2008)
- Gatot Pujo Nugroho, Governor of North Sumatra (2011-2015)

=== Mayors ===
- Ridwan Kamil, Mayor of Bandung (since 2013)
- Tri Rismaharini, Mayor of Surabaya (since 2010)
- Mohammad Ramdhan Pomanto, Mayor of Makassar (since 2014)
- Dada Rosada, Mayor of Bandung (2003-2013)
- F. X. Hadi Rudyatmo, Mayor of Surakarta (since 2012)
- Ateng Wahyudi, Mayor of Bandung (1983-1993)
- Joko Widodo, Mayor of Surakarta (2005-2012)
- Mahyeldi Ansharullah, Mayor of Padang (since 2014)
- Hasan Basri Durin, Mayor of Padang (1971-1983)

=== Members of People's Representative Council ===
- Alvin Lie
- Mukhamad Misbakhun
- Soedardjat Nataatmadja
- Budiman Sudjatmiko
- Astrid Susanto

=== Politicians ===
- Dipa Nusantara Aidit, senior leader of Communist Party of Indonesia (PKI)
- Biem Benyamin
- Manuel Carrascalão, former Indonesian politician
- Omar Dhani, commander of the Indonesian Air Force (1962-1965)
- H. S. Dillon, Indonesian Indian who has occupied a variety of positions in Indonesian political life, including assistant to the Minister of Agriculture, and Commissioner of the National Commission on Human Rights (of which he is still a member)
- Prabowo Subianto Djojohadikusumo, chairman of Gerindra political party, 2014 Indonesia's presidential candidate
- Eurico Guterres, pro-Indonesian or anti-independence militia recruited by the Indonesian military
- Loa Sek Hie, colonial politician, community leader, patrician, landlord and founder of Pao An Tui
- Hok Hoei Kan, prominent public figure, statesman, patrician and landowner of Peranakan Chinese descent
- Muhammad Taufiq Kiemas, 13th Speaker of People's Consultative Assembly (2009-2013), 5th First Gentleman of Indonesia (2001-2004)
- Musso, leader of the Indonesian Communist Party (PKI) in the 1920s and again during the Madiun rebellion of 1948
- Amien Rais, 1st Chairman of Partai Amanat Nasional (1998-2005)& Speaker of People's Consultative Assembly (1999-2004)
- Frans Tutuhatunewa, second president in exile of the Republic of the South Moluccas
- Hidayat Nur Wahid, 12th Speaker of Indonesia People's Consultative Assembly (2004-2009)
- Dede Yusuf, former Vice Governor of West Java, actor, model
- Sidarto Danusubroto, 14th Speaker of Indonesia People's Consultative Assembly (2013-2014)

=== Nobility ===
- Ahmad Jayadiningrat of Banten
- Hasanuddin of Gowa
- Andi Abdullah Bau Massepe of Gowa
- Sultan Tangkal Alam Bagagar of Pagaruyung
- Kyai Ronggo Ngabehi Soero Pernollo, Chinese-Javanese police chief, bureaucrat and founder of the Muslim branch of the Han family of Lasem
- Prince Diponegoro of Yogyakarta
- Paku Alam VIII of Yogyakarta
- Hamengkubuwana IX of Yogyakarta, 2nd Vice-President of Indonesia (1973-1978)
- Hamengkubuwana X of Yogyakarta, Governor of Yogyakarta (since 1998)
- Queen Hemas of Yogyakarta
- Princess Hayu of Yogyakarta
- Princess Pembayun of Yogyakarta

=== Activists ===
- Soe Hok Gie
- Ita Martadinata Haryono
- Munir
- Siti Munjiyah
- Poncke Princen
- Thung Sin Nio
- Yap Thiam Hien

=== Others ===
- Madame Wellington Koo (born Oei Hui-lan), First Lady of China, socialite and fashion icon, wife of the Chinese statesman Wellington Koo and daughter of Majoor Oei Tiong Ham
- Lolo Soetoro, step-father of Barack Obama
- Maya Soetoro-Ng, half-sister of Barack Obama
- Yenny Wahid, daughter of former president Abdurrahman Wahid
- Yusof Ishak, Singaporean politician and the first President of Singapore.

== Religious ==
=== Islam ===
- Abdul Karim Amrullah
- Abdurrahman Wahid
- Ahmad Dahlan
- Amien Rais
- Din Syamsuddin
- Mustofa Bisri
- Ahmad Dede
- Hamka
- Hasyim Asyari
- Hasyim Muzadi
- Idham Chalid
- Jefri Al Buchori
- Jimly Asshiddiqie
- Ma'ruf Amin
- Mohammad Natsir
- Quraish Shihab
- Rasuna Said
- Siti Walidah
- Tutty Alawiyah
- Tuanku Imam Bonjol
- Tuanku Tambusai
- Maria Ulfah
- Fakih Usman
- Wahid Hasyim

=== Buddhism ===
- Ashin Jinarakkhita
- Parwati Soepangat
- Soemantri Mohammad Saleh

=== Hinduism ===
- Gedong Bagus Oka
- Ketut Wiana
- Putu Sukreta Suranta

=== Protestantism ===
- Stephen Tong
- Ibrahim Tunggul Wulung
- Kyai Sadrach

=== Roman Catholic ===
- Albertus Soegijapranata
- Justinus Darmojuwono
- Julius Darmaatmadja
- Ignatius Suharyo Hardjoatmodjo
- Benyamin Yosef Bria
- Gabriel Manek

== Sport ==
=== Aviation ===
- Khouw Khe Hien, pioneering Indonesian aviator
- Khouw Keng Nio, first Indonesian and Chinese woman aviator (qualified in March 1936)

=== Archery ===
- Diananda Choirunisa
- Ika Yuliana Rochmawati
- Hendra Purnama
- Kusuma Wardhani
- Lilies Handayani
- Muhammad Hanif Wijaya
- Nurfitriyana Saiman
- Riau Ega Agatha
- Rina Dewi Puspitasari

=== Athletics ===
- Agus Prayogo
- Ade Rai
- Carolina Rieuwpassa
- Dedeh Erawati
- Desy Margawati
- Dolly Zegerius
- Edward Nabunone
- Fadlin
- Fernando Lumain
- Gurnam Singh
- Irene Truitje Joseph
- Lalu Muhammad Zohri
- Maria Natalia Londa
- Mohammad Sarengat
- Rio Maholtra
- Sapwaturrahman
- Sudirman Hadi
- Supriyati Sutono
- Suryo Agung Wibowo
- Triyaningsih
- Yaspi Boby

=== Auto racing ===
- Nyck de Vries, (quarter-Indonesian), Formula One racing driver
- Philo Paz Armand, Formula driver
- Sean Gelael, Formula driver
- Rio Haryanto, Formula driver
- Satrio Hermanto, Formula driver
- Ananda Mikola, Formula driver
- Doni Tata Pradita
- Moreno Soeprapto, Formula driver
- Rafid Topan Sucipto
- Dimas Ekky Pratama
- Galang Hendra Pratama

=== Badminton ===
- Ade Chandra
- Ade Yusuf Santoso
- Adriyanti Firdasari
- Afiat Yuris Wirawan
- Alamsyah Yunus
- Alan Budikusuma
- Alfian Eko Prasetya
- Alvent Yulianto
- Ana Rovita
- Andre Kurniawan Tedjono
- Andika Ramadiansyah
- Andrei Adistia
- Angelica Wiratama
- Angga Pratama
- Anggia Shitta Awanda
- Anggun Nugroho
- Anneke Feinya Agustin
- Annisa Saufika
- Anthony Sinisuka Ginting
- Antonius Ariantho
- Aprilia Yuswandari
- Apriyani Rahayu
- Ardy Wiranata
- Aryono Miranat
- Bambang Suprianto
- Bellaetrix Manuputty
- Berry Angriawan
- Bobby Ertanto
- Bona Septano
- Candra Wijaya
- Chico Aura Dwi Wardoyo
- Christian Hadinata
- Debby Susanto
- Denny Kantono
- Della Destiara Haris
- Dian Fitriani
- Dinar Dyah Ayustine
- Dionysius Hayom Rumbaka
- Devi Tika Permatasari
- Deyana Lomban
- Eddy Hartono
- Eddy Kurniawan
- Edi Subaktiar
- Eliza Nathanael
- Ellen Angelina
- Endang Nursugianti
- Eng Hian
- Erma Sulistianingsih
- Fajar Alfian
- Febby Angguni
- Fernando Kurniawan
- Ferry Sonneville
- Finarsih
- Fitriani
- Firman Abdul Kholik
- Fran Kurniawan
- Fransisca Ratnasari
- Gebby Ristiyani Imawan
- Gloria Emanuelle Widjaja
- Gregoria Mariska Tunjung
- Greysia Polii
- Hadibowo Susanto
- Hafiz Faizal
- Halim Haryanto
- Hanna Ramadini
- Hariamanto Kartono
- Hardianto
- Hariyanto Arbi
- Hastomo Arbi
- Hendra Setiawan
- Hendra Aprida Gunawan
- Hendrawan
- Hera Desi
- Hermawan Susanto
- Icuk Sugiarto
- Ihsan Maulana Mustofa
- Iie Sumirat
- Imelda Wiguna
- Indra Viki Okvana
- Irfan Fadhilah
- Ivana Lie
- Jauza Fadhila Sugiarto
- Jenna Gozali
- Jo Novita
- Johan Wahjudi
- Joko Suprianto
- Jonatan Christie
- Keshya Nurvita Hanadia
- Kevin Sanjaya Sukamuljo
- Komala Dewi
- Krishna Adi Nugraha
- Lidya Djaelawijaya
- Liem Swie King
- Lili Tampi
- Liliyana Natsir
- Lindaweni Fanetri
- Lingga Lie
- Lita Nurlita
- Lius Pongoh
- Lukhi Apri Nugroho
- Luluk Hadiyanto
- Maretha Dea Giovani
- Maria Febe Kusumastuti
- Maria Kristin Yulianti
- Marcus Fernaldi Gideon
- Markis Kido
- Marleve Mainaky
- Marsheilla Gischa Islami
- Masita Mahmudin
- Meiliana Jauhari
- Melati Daeva Oktavianti
- Mia Audina
- Millicent Wiranto
- Minarni
- Minarti Timur
- Moh Reza Pahlevi Isfahani
- Mohammad Ahsan
- Muhammad Rian Ardianto
- Muhammad Rijal
- Muhammad Ulinnuha
- Muljadi
- Mychelle Crhystine Bandaso
- Nadya Melati
- Natalia Christine Poluakan
- Ni Ketut Mahadewi Istarani
- Nisak Puji Lestari
- Nitya Krishinda Maheswari
- Nova Widianto
- Panji Ahmad Maulana
- Pia Zebadiah Bernadet
- Praveen Jordan
- Rani Mundiasti
- Rehan Naufal Kusharjanto
- Rendra Wijaya
- Retno Koestijah
- Rexy Mainaky
- Rian Sukmawan
- Richi Puspita Dili
- Ricky Karanda Suwardi
- Ricky Subagja
- Riky Widianto
- Rinov Rivaldy
- Ririn Amelia
- Rizki Amelia Pradipta
- Ronald Alexander
- Rosiana Tendean
- Rosyita Eka Putri Sari
- Rudy Gunawan
- Rudy Hartono
- Rudy Heryanto
- Ruselli Hartawan
- Sarwendah Kusumawardhani
- Selvanus Geh
- Serena Kani
- Shella Devi Aulia
- Shendy Puspa Irawati
- Shesar Hiren Rhustavito
- Sigit Budiarto
- Silvi Antarini
- Simon Santoso
- Siti Fadia Silva Ramadhanti
- Sony Dwi Kuncoro
- Sri Fatmawati
- Suci Rizki Andini
- Susi Susanti
- Tan Joe Hok
- Tania Oktaviani Kusumah
- Taty Sumirah
- Taufik Hidayat
- Tiara Rosalia Nuraidah
- Tjun Tjun
- Tommy Sugiarto
- Tony Gunawan
- Tri Kusharjanto
- Utami Kinard
- Vania Arianti Sukoco
- Variella Aprilsasi Putri Lejarsar
- Verawaty Fajrin
- Vita Marissa
- Wahyu Nayaka
- Weni Anggraini
- Wisnu Yuli Prasetyo
- Yeni Asmarani
- Yohanes Rendy Sugiarto
- Yonathan Suryatama Dasuki
- Yulianti
- Yulfira Barkah
- Zelin Resiana

=== Basketball ===
- Arki Dikania Wisnu

=== Body Building ===
- Ade Rai
- Ridwan Kodiat
- Ricky Syamsuri
- Katie Perryman

=== Boxing ===
- Chris John, WBA featherweight boxing champion
- Daud Yordan
- Ellyas Pical
- Muhammad Rachman
- Nico Thomas

=== Chess ===
- Utut Adianto
- Medina Warda Aulia
- Susanto Megaranto
- Irine Kharisma Sukandar

=== Gymnastics ===
- Rifda Irfanaluthfi

=== Jet ski ===
- Aero Sutan Aswar
- Aqsa Sutan Aswar

=== Judo ===
- Pujawati Utama
- Putu Wiradamungga

=== Football ===
- Elie Aiboy
- Yongki Aribowo
- Samsul Arif
- Ponaryo Astaman
- Irfan Bachdim
- Titus Bonai
- Gunawan Dwi Cahyo
- Syamsul Chaeruddin
- Serginho van Dijk
- Bruce Diporedjo
- Cristian Gonzáles
- Agus Indra Kurniawan
- Kim Kurniawan
- Stefano Lilipaly
- Chris Limahelu
- Ebrahim Enguio Lopez
- Oktovianus Maniani
- Markus Haris Maulana
- Diego Michiels
- Radja Nainggolan (half-Indonesian)
- Bambang Pamungkas
- Rochy Putiray
- Bima Sakti
- Vangelino Sastrodimedjo
- Boaz Solossa
- Ilija Spasojević
- Amadeus Suropati
- Firman Utina
- Andik Vermansyah
- Nol van der Vin
- Patrich Wanggai
- Wahyu Wijiastanto
- Ricky Yacobi
- Kurniawan Dwi Yulianto

=== Golf ===
- Inesh Putri Chandra

=== Poker ===
- John Juanda

=== Sailing ===
- Oka Sulaksana

=== Sport Climbing ===
- Desak Made Rita Kusuma Dewi
- Rajiah Sallsabillah
- Veddriq Leonardo

=== Swimming ===
- Achmad Dimyati
- Aflah Fadlan Prawira
- Glenn Victor Sutanto
- Habib Nasution
- I Gede Siman Sudartawa
- Kristiono Sumono
- Lukman Niode
- Ranomi Kromowidjojo (half-Indonesian), world record holder
- Raina Saumi Grahana
- Ressa Kania Dewi
- Ria Tobing
- Richard Sam Bera
- Ricky Anggawijaya
- Triady Fauzi Sidiq
- Wirmandi Sugriat
- Yessy Yosaputra

=== Taekwondo ===
- Defia Rosmaniar
- Juana Wangsa Putri
- Satriyo Rahadhani

=== Tennis ===
- Aldila Sutjiadi
- Angelique Widjaja
- Atet Wijono
- Ayi Sutarno
- Ayu Fani Damayanti
- Beatrice Gumulya
- Benny Wijaya
- Björn Phau (half-Indonesian)
- Bonit Wiryawan
- Christopher Rungkat
- Deria Nur Haliza
- Donald Wailan-Walalangi
- Grace Sari Ysidora
- Hary Suharyadi
- Irawati Moerid
- Jessy Rompies
- Jesse Huta Galung (half-Indonesian)
- Jooce Suwarimbo
- Justin Barki
- Lany Kaligis
- Lavinia Tananta
- Lita Liem Sugiarto
- Liza Andriyani
- Lukky Tedjamukti
- Lutfiana-Aris Budiharto
- Maya Rosa
- Mien Suhadi
- Natalia Soetrisno
- Olivia Tjandramulia
- Romana Tedjakusuma
- Sandy Gumulya
- Septi Mende
- Suzanna Wibowo
- Tami Grende
- Vivien Silfany-Tony
- Wukirasih Sawondari
- Wynne Prakusya
- Yayuk Basuki

=== Volleyball ===
- Megawati Hangestri Pertiwi

=== Weightlifting ===
- Citra Febrianti
- Deni
- Dewi Safitri
- Eko Yuli Irawan
- I Ketut Ariana
- Jadi Setiadi
- Muhammad Hasbi
- Patmawati Abdul Hamid
- Raema Lisa Rumbewas
- Rahmat Erwin Abdullah
- Rizki Juniansyah
- Sandow Nasution
- Surahmat Wijoyo
- Sri Indriyani
- Sri Wahyuni Agustiani
- Triyatno
- Winarni Binti Slamet

=== Wushu ===
- Lindswell Kwok

== Science & technology ==
- Joe Hin Tjio
- Taufik Akbar
- Jim Geovedi
- Jusuf Habibie
- Soedarsono Hadisapoetro
- Samaun Samadikun
- Nurwidi Asmoro
- Pratiwi Sudarmono
- Hary Gunarto

== See also ==
- Indonesian Australians
- Indonesians in Hong Kong
- Indonesians in Japan
- Indonesians in Malaysia
- Indonesians in the Philippines
- Indonesians in the United Kingdom
- Indonesian Americans
- Chinese Indonesians
- List of Javanese
- List of Minangkabau people
- List of Sundanese people
