= List of Javanese people =

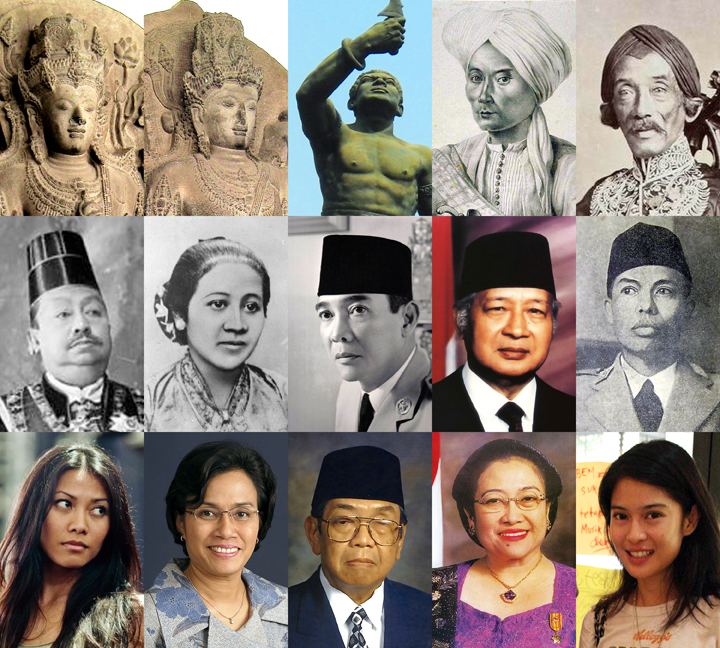
A collage of notable Javanese people

This is a list of notable Javanese people.

== Academics ==
- Ki Hajar Dewantara, pioneer of education in Indonesia.
- Winai Dahlan, director of Halal Science Center, Chulalongkorn University
- Poerbatjaraka, specialist in Javanese literature
- Selo Soemardjan, sociologist
- Siti Fadilah, Indonesian cardiology research specialist and former Minister of Health of Indonesia
- Soedarsono Hadisapoetro, agriculture scientist

== Activists ==
- Kartini, Indonesian national hero, pioneer of Javanese women rights
- Munir Said Thalib, human rights activist (also of Arab descent)

== Art ==
- Affandi, expressionistic painter
- Basuki Abdullah, Indonesian realist and naturalist painter
- Djoko Pekik, painter and sculptor
- Guruh Sukarnoputra, choreographer
- Iwan Tirta, Indonesian batik designer
- Soeki Irodikromo, Surinamese painter
- Reinier Asmoredjo, Surinamese painter
- Marina Joesoef, Indonesian painter and photographer (Javanese father)
- Raden Saleh, aristocratic painter in the 19th century

== Authors ==
- Ayu Utami, author, known for the novel Saman
- George Junus Aditjondro, Indonesian sociologist
- Koentjaraningrat, Indonesian anthropologist
- Mpu Prapanca, Buddhist monk and poet, author of the Nagarakretagama
- Pramoedya Ananta Toer, author, known for the novel Bumi Manusia
- Sapardi Djoko Damono, poet
- Subagio Sastrowardoyo, poet, essayist, and literary critic
- Willibrordus S. Rendra, dramatist and poet
- Ronggowarsito, poet from the court of Kraton Surakarta
- Emha Ainun Nadjib, poet, scholar, and humanist

== Business ==
- Dahlan Iskan, owner of Jawa Pos Group and President Director of PLN Indonesia
- Setiawan Djody, owner of Setdco group
- Tommy Suharto, founder of Humpuss group

== Cinema ==
- Garin Nugroho, film director
- Febian Nurrahman Saktinegara, film director
- Rudy Soedjarwo, film director

== Classical figures ==
- Gajah Mada, Majapahitan prime minister who became famous with his palapa oath
- Airlangga, founder of the Kahuripan kingdom
- Hayam Wuruk, king from Rajasa dynasty and the fourth monarch of Majapahit during the empire's golden age
- Joko Tingkir, founder and first king of the Sultanate of Pajang
- Jayabaya, king and prophet in ancient Kediri kingdom
- Ken Arok, founder of Rajasa dynasty whose descendants became the ruling house of Singhasari Kingdom and Majapahit empire
- Ken Dedes, wife of Ken Arok
- Raden Wijaya, king from Rajasa dynasty and the first monarch of Majapahit
- Rakai Pikatan, king of Sanjaya dynasty in the 9th century AD, builder of Prambanan Hindu temple in Central Java
- Samaratungga, king of Sailendra dynasty, builder of the Borobudur Buddhist temple in Central Java

== Comedians ==
- Basuki
- Benyamin Sueb
- Indra Birowo
- Jojon
- Tukul Arwana

== Economics ==
- Airlangga Hartanto, 28th Ministry Industry of Indonesia
- Bambang Soesatyo, 17th Speaker of People's Representative Council
- Boediono, former governor Bank of Indonesia and 11th Vice President of Indonesia
- Joko Widodo, 7th President of Indonesia
- Radius Prawiro, former governor Bank of Indonesia
- Subroto, economist and part of the Berkeley Mafia
- Setya Novanto, 16th Speaker of People's Representative Council
- Susi Pudjiastuti, 1st CEO Susi Air
- Sri Mulyani Indrawati, Indonesian minister and Managing Director of the World Bank Group
- Widjojo Nitisastro, Indonesian minister

== Entertainment ==
- Adipati Dolken, Indonesian actor and model (also of German descent)
- Adinia Wirasti, Indonesian actress and model
- Adjie Massaid, Indonesian actor, model, and politician
- Amara, prominent Indonesian singer, model, actress and practitioner of Muay Thai
- Anjasmara, Indonesian actor and yogist
- Ario Bayu, Indonesian actor and model
- Aziz Sattar, Singaporean and Malaysian actor, comedian, singer, and director
- Basuki, Indonesian comedian
- Benyamin Sueb, Indonesian comedian, actor, and singer (Javanese father)
- Christian Sugiono, Indonesian actor and model (also of Chinese, German descent)
- Dian Sastrowardoyo, Indonesian model and actress
- Didi Petet, Indonesian actor
- Devi Dja, Indonesian-born American actress, dancer, and singer
- Dwi Sasono, Indonesian actor
- Kasma Booty, Malaysian actress and film star
- Luna Maya Sugeng, model, actress, singer and presenter (also of Austrian descent)
- Mariana Renata (half-Indonesian), model
- Maria Selena, Indonesian actress
- Mark-Paul Gosselaar, actor (Javanese mother)
- Maudy Ayunda, Indonesian actress, model, activist, singer, and writer
- Nadine Alexandra (half-Indonesian), actress
- Nadine Chandrawinata (half-Indonesian), actress and model
- Nicholas Saputra, Indonesian actor (half Javanese-half German)
- Pandji Pragiwaksono, Indonesian stand-up comedian
- Pradikta Wicaksono, Indonesian singer and actor
- Pierre Coffin, French director and animator (Javanese mother)
- RIo Dewanto, Indonesian actor and model
- Roy Marten (half-Indonesian), Indonesian actor, model and producer
- Sheila Majid, Malaysian singer
- Tio Pakusadewo, prominent Indonesian actor
- Tora Sudiro, Indonesian actor
- Tukul Arwana, Indonesian comedian and late night talk show host
- Widyawati, Indonesian actress
- Yoshi Sudarso, Indonesian actor
- Yuki Kato, Indonesian actress, model, and television presenter (half Javanese-half Japanese)

== Journalism ==
- Aiman Witjaksono, Indonesian journalist, news anchor, and interviewer
- Bambang Harymurti, editor-in-chief of Tempo
- Goenawan Mohamad, founder of Tempo

== Military ==
- Ahmad Yani, Indonesian Revolutionary Hero
- Bambang Darmono, Indonesian major general
- Bambang Soegeng, Indonesian independence hero
- Bambang Hendarso Danuri, chief of the Indonesian National Police
- Djatikoesoemo, Indonesian independence hero
- Djoko Suyanto, former commander of the Indonesian army
- Endriartono Sutarto, former commander of the Indonesian army
- Gatot Soebroto, Indonesian independence hero
- Katamso, Indonesian revolutionary hero
- Kyai Ronggo Ngabehi Soero Pernollo, Chinese-Javanese police chief, bureaucrat and founder of the Muslim branch of the Han family of Lasem
- Leonardus Benjamin Moerdani, former commander of Indonesian army
- M. T. Haryono, Indonesian revolutionary hero
- Omar Dhani, former Indonesian chief of the Air Staff
- Sarwo Edhie Wibowo, Indonesian general
- S. Parman, Indonesian revolutionary hero
- Soeprapto, Indonesian revolutionary hero
- Sudirman, Indonesian general during war of independence
- Suharto, Indonesian Army, President of Indonesia
- Supriyadi, appointed in absentia as Indonesia's first Minister of Defense, but never came forward
- Sutanto, former chief of Indonesian Police and the third head of Indonesian intelligence
- Sutomo, Indonesian military leader during the Indonesian National Revolution against the Netherlands
- Sutoyo Siswomiharjo, Indonesian revolutionary hero
- Untung Syamsuri, leader of the 30 September Movement
- Widodo Adi Sutjipto, former commander of Indonesian army
- Wiranto, former commander of the Indonesian military

== Music ==
- Ahmad Dhani, Indonesian rock singer and songwriter (also of Ashkenazi Jewish descent)
- Anang Hermansyah, singer
- Anggun Cipta Sasmi, Indonesian and French singer
- Ardhito Pramono, singer
- Ari Lasso, singer, musical artist
- Azmyl Yunor, Malaysian singer-songwriter
- Didi Kempot, singer-songwriter
- Ebiet G. Ade, singer and songwriter
- Eddie Van Halen and Alex Van Halen, American rock band Van Halen, Javanese mother
- Gesang Martohartono, composer of the song "Bengawan Solo"
- Gombloh, singer and inger-songwriter
- Ian Antono, guitarist and songwriter
- Inul Daratista, dangdut singer
- Isyana Sarasvati, singer-songwriter
- Iwan Fals, folk singer-songwriter
- Krisdayanti, popular singer
- Maissy (Pramaisshela Arinda Daryono Putri), child singer
- Mawi, Malaysian singer
- Michelle Branch, American singer (one Javanese grandparent)
- Nafa Urbach, actress and singer
- Ning Baizura, Malaysian pop singer
- K.P.H Notoprojo, composer
- Rini Wulandari, singer
- Siti Nurhaliza, Malaysian singer and actress (Javanese-Malays).
- Slamet Abdul Sjukur, composer
- Soimah, singer, comedian, pesindhen, and entertainer
- Tiara Andini, singer
- Titiek Puspa, musician
- Raden Ajeng Srimulat, Keroncong singer and comedian popular in the 1940s-1960s
- Sudirman Arshad, a popular Malaysian singer in the 1980s
- Urip Achmad Ariyanto, singer
- Via Vallen, dangdut koplo singer
- Vidi Aldiano, singer
- W.R Supratman, composer of "Indonesia Raya", the national anthem of Indonesia
- Yuni Shara, pop singer

== Politics ==
=== Head of States/Governments ===
- Abdurrahman Wahid, Muslim intellectual and 4th President of Indonesia (also of Chinese and Arab descent)
- Ahmad Zahid Hamidi, Deputy Prime Minister of Malaysia, Chairman of UMNO, MP for Bagan Datuk
- B. J. Habibie, scientist and former Indonesian president (also of Bugis descent)
- Boediono, former Vice President of Indonesia
- Joko Widodo, 7th President of Indonesia, former Governor of Jakarta and Mayor of Surakarta
- Megawati Soekarnoputri, 5th President of Indonesian, daughter of Sukarno, chairwoman of PDI-P
- Muhyiddin Yassin, former Prime Minister of Malaysia, Chairman of BERSATU
- Sri Sultan Hamengkubuwono IX, former Indonesian vice-president, former Sultan of Yogyakarta, former governor of Special Region of Yogyakarta
- Sudharmono, former Indonesian vice-president
- Suharto, 2nd President of Indonesia
- Sukarno, one of Indonesia's founding fathers and former president
- Susilo Bambang Yudhoyono, 6th President of Indonesia
- Try Sutrisno, former Indonesian vice-president
- Wilopo, former Prime Minister of Indonesia

=== Governors & Chief Ministers ===
- Ganjar Pranowo, Indonesian politician, former Governor of Central Java
- Mohamed Khir bin Toyo, ex-Chief Minister of Selangor, Malaysia
- Sri Sultan Hamengkubuwono X, current Sultan of Yogyakarta, current governor of Special Region of Yogyakarta
- Sutiyoso, former Governor of Jakarta

=== Other Politicians ===
- Agung Laksono, Indonesian minister of peoples welfare
- Ali Sastroamidjojo, former Prime Minister of Indonesia
- Amien Rais, leader of Indonesia's Constitutional Assembly (MPR), 1999-2004
- Anas Urbaningrum, the chairman of the Democratic Party
- Anton Apriantono, Indonesian minister
- Bambang Brodjonegoro, Indonesian minister
- Budiman Sudjatmiko, Indonesian parliament member
- Ernest Douwes Dekker, Indonesian freedom fighter, one of the founder of Indische Partij (also of Dutch and German descent)
- Gibran Rakabuming Raka, current mayor of Surakarta, son of Joko Widodo
- Hidayat Nur Wahid, leader of Indonesia's Constitutional Assembly (MPR)
- Mohamed Rahmat, former Information Minister of Malaysia
- Musso, leader of the Communist Party of Indonesia
- Nur Jazlan Mohamed, Malaysian politician and member of the Parliament of Malaysia
- Sjam Kamaruzaman, key member of the Communist Party of Indonesia
- Paul Somohardjo, Surinamese politician
- Prabowo Subianto, Minister of Defense of the Republic of Indonesia, Chief of the Gerindra Party
- Retno Marsudi, Minister of Foreign Affairs of the Republic of Indonesia
- Ruslan Abdulgani, former Indonesian vice prime minister
- Soenario, former Indonesian foreign minister and ambassador
- Sri Mulyani Indrawati, Minister of Finance of the Republic of Indonesia, former Director of the World Bank
- Tjahjo Kumolo, former Indonesian minister
- Tjipto Mangoenkoesoemo, Indonesian independence hero, one of the founders of the Indische Partij
- Tjokroaminoto, first leader of Sarekat Dagang Islam
- Tri Rismaharini, Indonesian politician, former mayor of Surabaya (first woman mayor of surabaya), current Indonesian Minister of Social Affairs
- Wahid Hasyim, first Indonesian Minister of Religious Affairs, father of Abdurrahman Wahid
- Wilopo, former Prime Minister of Indonesia
- Yenny Wahid, Indonesian Islamic activist and politician, daughter of Abdurrahman Wahid

== Religion ==
- Abdurrahman Wahid, chairman of Nahdlatul Ulama, President of Indonesia
- Ahmad Dahlan, Indonesian Islamic revivalist who established Muhammadiyah in 1912
- Albertus Soegijapranata, first Indonesian native bishop
- Emha Ainun Nadjib, prominent Indonesian Muslim intellectual
- Hasyim Asy'ari, founder of Nahdlatul Ulama
- Hasyim Muzadi, chairman of Nahdlatul Ulama, indonesian politician
- Ibrahim Tunggul Wulung, Protestant evangelist
- Ignatius Suharyo, Roman Catholic archbishop of Archdiocese of Jakarta
- Julius Darmaatmadja, Indonesian Cardinal of the Roman Catholic church
- Justinus Darmojuwono, first Indonesian Cardinal of the Roman Catholic church
- Kyai Sadrach, prominent Protestant evangelist and influential leader
- Muammar Z.A., Indonesian Quran reciter
- Nurcholish Madjid, prominent Indonesian Muslim intellectual
- Parwati Soepangat, Indonesian Buddhist figure who established Wanita Buddhis Indonesia (WBI) in 1973 and became the first chairman of WBI.
- Wahid Hasyim, chairman of Nahdlatul Ulama and Indonesian minister
- Muhammad Subuh Sumohadiwidjojo, founder of new religious movement Subud

== Science ==
- Pratiwi Sudarmono, scientist and former astronaut candidate
- Samaun Samadikun, engineer and educator
- Y. B. Mangunwijaya, Indonesian architect, writer, and Catholic religious leader

== Sports ==
- Ananda Mikola, Indonesian race car driver
- Andik Vermansyah, Indonesian soccer player
- Bambang Pamungkas, Indonesian soccer player
- Bima Sakti, Indonesian soccer player
- Budi Sudarsono, Indonesian soccer player
- Bambang Suprianto, Indonesian badminton player
- Bruce Diporedjo
- Citra Febrianti, Indonesian weightlifter
- Eko Yuli Irawan, Indonesian weightlifter
- Gunawan Dwi Cahyo, Indonesian soccer player
- Hendro Kartiko, Indonesian soccer player
- Icuk Sugiarto, former Indonesian badminton player, rated among the world's best in the 1980s
- Ika Yuliana Rochmawati, Indonesian archer
- Joko Riyadi, Indonesian badminton player
- Virgil Soeroredjo, Surinamese badminton player
- Joko Suprianto, former Indonesian badminton player, rated among the world's best in the 1990s
- Kurniawan Dwi Yulianto, Indonesian soccer player
- Leroy Resodihardjo, Dutch professional footballer
- Lilies Handayani, Indonesian archer
- Maarten Atmodikoro, Dutch/Surinamese footballer
- Dylan Darmohoetomo, Surinamese badminton player
- Mahali Jasuli, Malaysian footballer
- Maria Kristin Yulianti, Indonesian badminton player, Olympic bronze medalist
- Mohd Amri Yahyah, Malaysian footballer
- Mohd Safee Mohd Sali, Malaysian footballer
- Moreno Soeprapto, Indonesian race car driver
- Nova Widianto, Indonesian badminton player
- Pratama Arhan, Indonesian footballer
- Ranomi Kromowidjojo, Dutch swimmer
- Rian Ardianto, Indonesian badminton player
- Rina Dewi Puspitasari, Indonesian archer
- Serginho van Dijk, Indonesian soccer player
- Shesar Rhustavito, Indonesian badminton player
- Sigit Budiarto, Indonesian badminton athlete
- Sigourney Bandjar, Surinamese-born Dutch footballer
- Sony Dwi Kuncoro, Indonesian badminton player, Olympic bronze medalist
- Sri Indriyani, Indonesian weightlifter
- Sugiantoro, Indonesian soccer player
- Suryo Agung Wibowo, Indonesian sprinter
- Triyatno, Indonesian weightlifter
- Utut Adianto, Indonesian chess Grandmaster
- Wahyu Wijiastanto, Indonesian soccer player
- Widodo C Putro, Indonesian soccer player
- Winarni Binti Slamet, Indonesian weightlifter
- Yayuk Basuki, Indonesian tennis athlete
- Yongki Aribowo, Indonesian soccer player
- Neraysho Kasanwirjo

== Others ==
- Agni Pratistha, Indonesia's representative at the Miss Universe 2007 pageant
- Maya Soetoro-Ng, Barack Obama's half-sister (also of German descent)
- Nadine Chandrawinata, Indonesia's representative at the Miss Universe 2006 pageant (also of German and Chinese descent)
- Pangeran Diponegoro, Javanese prince who opposed Dutch colonial rule
- Putri Raemawasti, Indonesia's representative at the Miss Universe 2008 pageant
- Siti Hartinah, wife of former Indonesian President Suharto, first lady of Indonesia
- Mak Erot, who lived to be over 100 and was noted for penis-extension techniques

== See also ==
- List of Indonesians
- Overseas Indonesians
  - Indonesian Malaysians
  - Javanese diaspora
  - Javanese Malaysians
  - Javanese Surinamese
  - Javanese New Caledonians
  - Javanese Sri Lankans
  - Javanese Singaporeans
- List of Acehnese people
- List of Batak people
- List of Bugis people
- List of Chinese Indonesians
- List of Minangkabaus
- List of Moluccan people
- List of Sundanese people
