= Jakarta Fashion Week =

Annual fashion event in Jakarta, Indonesia

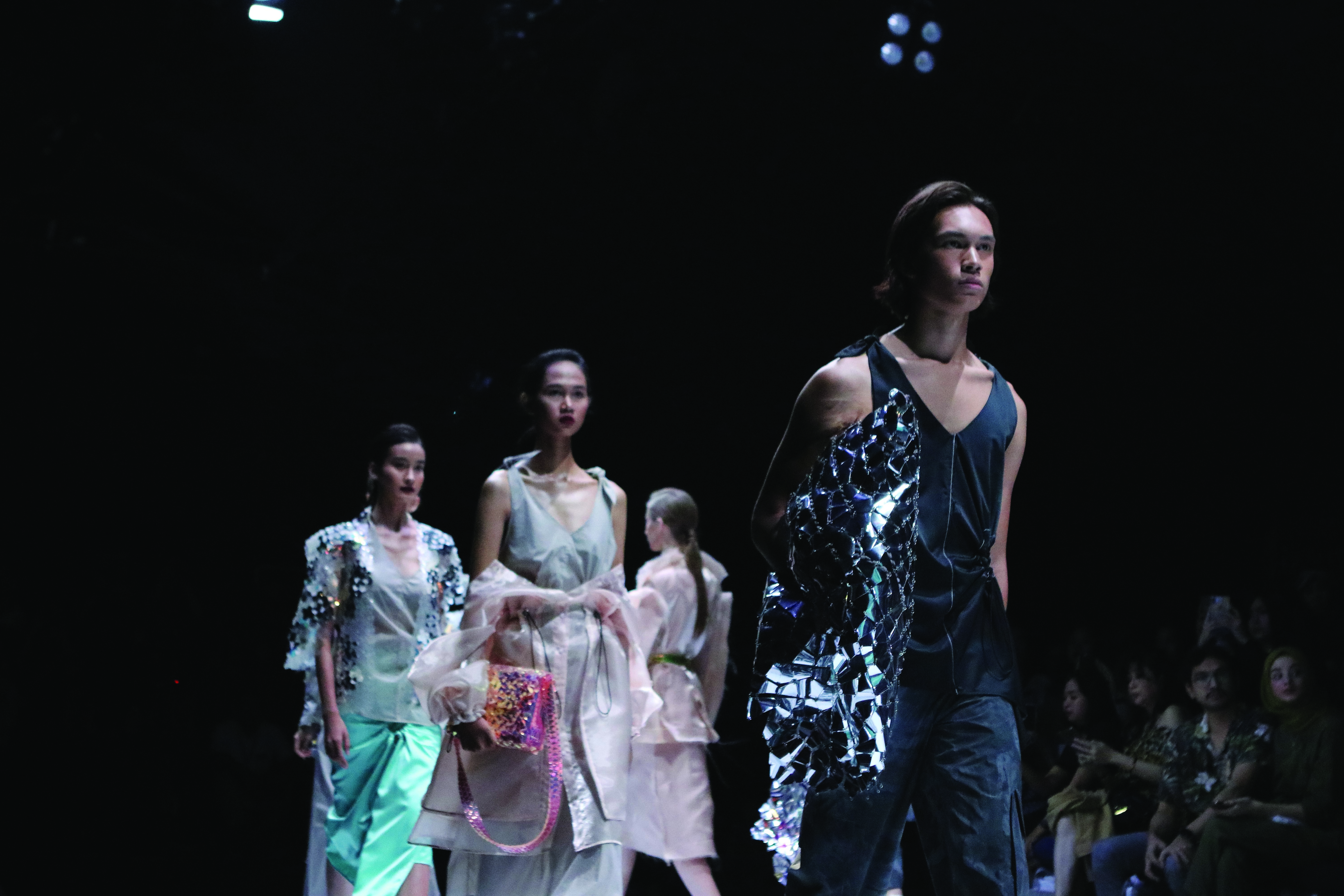
- Genre: Clothing and fashion exhibitions
- Frequency: Annually
- Location: Jakarta primarily at Pondok Indah Mall 3
- Country: Indonesia
- Inaugurated: 2008
- Most recent: 23–29 October 2023
- Previous event: 24–30 October 2022
- Organizer: Femina Group (2008 - 2018), GCM Group (2019 - present)
- Website: www.jakartafashionweek.co.id

Jakarta Fashion Week or JFW is a fashion event held annually in Jakarta, Indonesia. JFW is dubbed as the largest fashion event in Southeast Asia. JFW is organized as a collaboration platform between major stakeholders of the fashion and creative industry with the industry actors and community by GCM Group (formerly part of Femina Group).

The event aims to provide directions to the Indonesian fashion industry as well as a vehicle to demonstrate its wealth in talents and creativity, and ultimately transform Jakarta as a major fashion hub in the region and the world.

Fashion shows are strictly invite-only events designed for celebrities, buyers, and both local and international media. They bring together fashion enthusiasts to experience collections from top-tier international talent as well as standout Indonesian designers like Anne Avantie, Rinaldy Yunardi, and Dian Pelangi.

== Origins ==
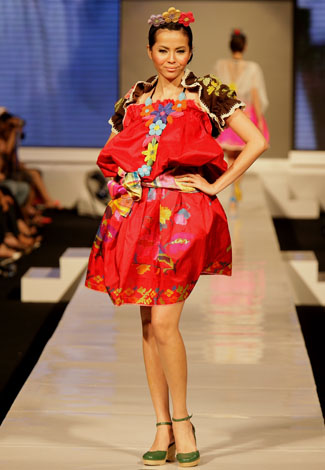
Puteri Indonesia Lingkungan 2005 and Miss World Indonesia 2006, Lindi Cistia Prabha walks in Jakarta fashion Week 2008.

As a media group, Femina Group had been back and forth to all major fashion weeks throughout the world. As the world's most populous Muslim majority country, Indonesia has a high demand for clothing that adheres to religious rules emphasizing modesty for women. One of the main goals of JFW is to transform the country's fashion industry to become one of the global leaders in fashion, especially the modest fashion industry that is worth nearly $100 billion.

In 2008, JFW was initiated for the first time by Femina Group, with the support from the DKI Jakarta Tourism Office, Indonesian Fashion Designers Association (APPMI), and the Indonesian Fashion Designers Association (IPMI).

== Rebranding ==
When Femina Group reorganized the group into Femina Group and GCM Group in late 2018, JFW became part of GCM Group entirely, along with Dewi Magazine, pesona.co.id, Primarasa, and Cita Cinta.

JFW announced a new logo, eliminating the coin-shaped silhouette and the signature red "f" on January 30, 2019, initially on Instagram. The caption was simply: "We have been using the iconic coin-shaped logo since 2010. It's time to #StartFresh."

== Locations ==
Since its first implementation in 2008 to 2011, JFW was held at Pacific Place Jakarta. In 2012, JFW was held at Plaza Senayan before finally being held at Senayan City throughout 2013–2019.

In 2020, JFW 2021 came with a new concept as an adaptation to the COVID-19 pandemic. The entire series of Jakarta Fashion Week 2021 events on 26–29 November 2020 was broadcast on www.jfw.tv and several digital platforms so that fashion enthusiasts from all over the world could watch the fashion shows, talk shows, and various JFW content.

After the pandemic spread declined, JFW 2022 was held offline on 24–30 October 2022, in Pondok Indah Mall 3. After that, PIM 3 becomes the new venue of JFW on the next editions.

== Lomba Perancang Mode ==
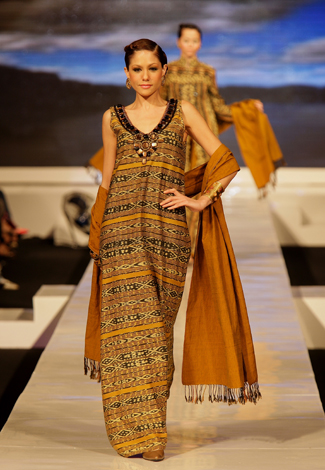
Miss Universe Indonesia 1995 and Puteri Indonesia 1995, Susanty Priscilla Adresina Manuhutu walks at The Jakarta Fashion Week 2008.

Since its inception in 1978, Fashion Designer Competition or Lomba Perancang Mode (LPM) has orbited several of Indonesia's top designers, such as Itang Yunasz, Samuel Wattimena, Chossy Latu, Edward Hutabarat, Carmanita, Ferry Soenarto, Denny Wirawan, Musa Widiatmodjo, Stephanus Hamy, Widhi Budimulia, Tex Saverio, Jeffrey Tan, Natalia Kiantoro, Andreas Odang, Cynthia Tan, and Billy Tjong.

Had a hiatus due to the monetary crisis from 1997 to 2002, this annual event was reopened in 2003 and is now held every two years. With this change in implementation time, it is expected that the number of participants will become more numerous, and provide longer opportunities for prospective designers to think, so as to be able to provide their best work.

In 2008, Pia Alisjahbana, the same figure that initiated the Lomba Perancang Mode, coined the Lomba Perancang Aksesori that ever since then is also held biannually - alternating with the LPM competition. Rinaldy Yunardi, the godfather of Indonesian avant-garde accessory designers is a frequent judge-mentor in this competition. Some notable alumni of this competition are Amanda Mitsuri and Yonatan Digo Permadi.

The rapid growth of men's lifestyle business was the focus in 2010s, providing a gap for the shining of new creative talents to reach for the fresh but not so new market. Embracing the new niche, Menswear Fashion Design Competition (LPM Menswear) was introduced in 2017 and is held annually ever since.

== Indonesia Fashion Forward ==
Indonesia Fashion Forward (IFF) is an intensive and curative program for capacity development with a vision to polish Indonesian designers’ skills so that they're able to enter the regional and international market by giving guidance alongside training that involves business strategy and branding.

Not just being an educational platform that equips designers with theory and simulations, IFF cooperates with strategic partners from the government to international so that the program can have continuity to practice on the ground. This program was initiated in 2012 by JFW and British Council, with support from BEKRAF in its early years, and now has guided more than 40 designers about the ins and outs of the fashion business so that they have the right capitals to become a global player.

Its main education partner is the Center for Fashion Enterprise London, and it has several platform exchange program with various fashion week through its organizers or local creative authorities, such as Tokyo Fashion Week, Seoul Fashion KODE, Virgin Australia Melbourne Fashion Festival, Style Bangkok, and India Fashion Week.

The program stopped its curation in 2017 due to the lack of financial support from the national stakeholders, while British Council has never ceased its support for the program.

Selection Year	Designers
2012	Albert Yanuar, Barli Asmara, Bretzel (Imelda Kartini), Cotton Ink (Carline Darjanto and Ria Sarwono), Dian Pelangi, Jeffry Tan, Major Minor (Ari Seputra, Sari Seputra), Yosafat Dwi Kurniawan
2013	Milcah (Faustine dan Eda Arthaputri), N.F.R.T. (Prita Widyaputri and Theresia Alit Widyasari), TOTON (Toton Januar), Monday to Sunday (Dita Addlecoat dan Mellyun Xing), 8Eri (Eridani), NurZahra, La Spina (Lianna Gunawan), Friederich Herman, Jenahara (Jenahara Nasution), Vinora (Vinora Ng), Tex Saverio, Batik Chic (Novita Yunus)
2014	Monstore (Nicholas Yudha, Michael Krisyanto, and Agatha Carolina), TODJO (Sapto Djojokartiko), Peggy Hartanto, Patrick Owen, Rosalyn Citta, Billy Tjong, fBudi (Felicia Budi), Tertia (Tertia Enda), ETU (Restu Anggraini), Andhita Siswandi, Norma Moi (Norma Hauri), JII (Gloria Agatha)
2015	LEKAT (Amanda Indah Lestari), D’leia (Lea Maria), Anthony Bachtiar, I.K.Y.K. (Anandia Putri), Ria Miranda, ShopAtVelvet / ByVelvet (Yessi Kusumo and Randy W. Sastra), alex(a)lexa / SOE Jakarta (Monique and Sandy Soeriaatmadja), Sean & Sheila (Sean Loh and Sheila Agatha), Lotuz (Michelle E. Surjaputra), Ellyhan / Valentino Mutiara (Lia Ellyhan)
2016	B-Y-O (Tommy Ambiyo Tedji), Day and Night / YELLE (Yelly and Konny Lumentu), Rani Hatta, BATEEQ (Michelle Tjokrosaputro), Paulina Katarina (Surya Paulina and Ratna Katarina)
2017	ATS The Label (Regina Rafika), PVRA (Kara Nugroho and Putri Katianda), Reves Studio (Karina Widjaja and Karina Priscilla), Kami Idea (Istafiana Candarini, Nadya Karina and Afina Candarini), Vivian Lee, Danjyo Hiyoji (Dana Maulana and Liza Masitha), Mazuki

To further accommodate the growth of IFF, Fashionlink was initiated in 2012. On its first two days, usually held on the third day of JFW, professional buyers/retailers who have reserved their attendance can do a private viewing of the exclusive collections of selected designers in a special area. For ordinary visitors who want to shop, Fashionlink Hub & Market, the current name of Fashionlink Showroom and Market before its renaming in 2020, will be accessible throughout the remaining days.

Fashionlink subsequently had its own permanent retail space: Fashionlink x #BLCKVNUE (since 2016) in Senayan City and Fashionhub (since 2018) in Gandaria City. It also has a special edition market, part of JFW's Ramadan festivity: Ramadhan Fashion Festival, that is held annually during the fasting month, known as Fashionlink Ramadhan Market.

== JFW Model Search ==
Jakarta Fashion Week Model Search, or abbreviated as JFW Model Search, is held annually to look for the best talent in the modeling world as well as being the main audition event for all models that will walk on the Jakarta Fashion Week runway since the first JFW in 2008.

This audition was exclusively held in Jakarta, until its expansion in 2017 that brought JFW Model Search to several other major cities in Indonesia, namely Bali, Yogyakarta, Surabaya, Medan, and Bandung. Also in 2017, JFW began searching for a figure called Face of Indonesia, the model ambassador for JFW. Wita Juwita became the first model to get this title.

In 2018, Face of JFW changed its name to Icons of JFW and chose not only one female model, but also one male model. In that year, Agnes Natasya Tjie and Adam Rosyidi were elected as Icons of JFW.

With the high public interest in this model selection event, JFW presented The Search for JFW Icons in 2019, a web series that aired exclusively on the YouTube channel of Jakarta Fashion Week. The first pair of models chosen through this web series were Devona Cools and Axel Jan Thierry. In 2020, two models who were selected as JFW Icons were Rizal Rama and Maria Karina.

== List of Jakarta Fashion Weeks ==
Year	Title	Dates	Location	Numbers of Designers	Notable Designers
2008	Jakarta Fashion Week 2008	20-24 August 2008	Pacific Place Jakarta	47 designers	Akira Isogawa (supported by Austrade)
2009	Jakarta Fashion Week 2009/2010 (presented by Bank BRI)	14–20 November 2009	Pacific Place Jakarta	108 designers	Priyo Oktaviano, Sebastian Gunawan, Tarun Tahiliani, and Malini Ramani.
2010	Jakarta Fashion Week 2010/2011	6–12 November 2010	Pacific Place Jakarta	159 designers	Anne Avantie, Ari Seputra, Edward Hutabarat, Lenny Agustin, Ghea Panggabean, Priyo Oktaviano, Oscar Lawalata, Laura Miles
2011	Jakarta Fashion Week 2012	12-18 November 2011	Pacific Place Jakarta	(unknown)	Robby Tumewu, Andrea Risjad, Bin House, Tex Saverio, Biyan Wanaatmadja, Ashley Isham, Bernard Chandran, Tube Gallery, Sebastian Gunawan, Auguste Soesastro, Sally Koeswanto, Sapto Djojokartiko
2012	Jakarta Fashion Week 2013	3-9 November 2012	Plaza Senayan	180 designers	Sebastian Gunawan, Lie Sang Bong, Ivan Gunawan, Anne Avantie, Hengky Kawilarang, Didiet Maulana, Iwet Ramadhan, Luna Maya, Bin House, Lenny Agustin
2013	Jakarta Fashion Week 2014	19-25 October 2013	Plaza Senayan	240 designers	Oscar Lawalata, Populo Batik, Priyo Oktaviano, Tex Saverio, Toton, Eridani, Vinora Ng, Carmanita, Ferry Sunarto, Andreas Odang, Hian Tjen, Lenny Agustin, Billy Tjong, Patrick Owen, Soko Wiyanto
2014	Jakarta Fashion Week 2015	24–30 October 2014	Plaza Senayan	165 designers	Auguste Susastro, Nur Zahra, Priyo Oktaviano, Sapto Djojokartiko, Vinora Ng, Ria Miranda, Ardistia New York, Barli Asmara, Deden Siswanto, Mel Ahyar, Priyo Oktaviano, Sapto Djojokartiko, Major Minor
2015	Jakarta Fashion Week 2016	24–30 October 2015	Plaza Senayan	(unknown)	Rinaldy A. Yunardi, Anne Avantie, Lulu Lutfi Labibi, Peggy Hartanto, Didi Budiardjo, Felicia Budi, Haryono Setiadi, Hanni Hananto, Chossy Latu, Stella Rissa, Peggy Hartanto, Albert Yanuar, Sapto Djojokartiko
2016	Jakarta Fashion Week 2017	22–28 October 2016	Plaza Senayan	250 designers	Anne Avantie, Didi Budiardjo, Major Minor, Saptodjojokartiko, Toton, Vinora Ng, Itang Yunasz, Musa Widyatmodjo, Felicia Budi, Ali Charisma, Chitra Subiyakto, Mel Ahyar, Hannie Hananto, Jeffry Tan, Jenahara, Norma Hauri
2017	Jakarta Fashion Week 2018	21-27 October 2017	Plaza Senayan	(unknown)	Barli Asmara, Auguste Soesastro, Deden Siswanto, Lulu Lutfi Labibi, Jenahara, Rani Hatta
2018	Jakarta Fashion Week 2019	20-26 October 2018	Senayan City	(unknown)	Anne Avantie, Peggy Hartanto, Barli Asmara, Dian Pelangi, Rani Hatta, Hannie Hananto, Toton, Felicia Budi, Eri Dani, Ria Miranda, Restu Anggraini, Norma Hauri
2019	Jakarta Fashion Week 2020	22-29 October 2019	Senayan City	270 designers	Auguste Soesastro, Mel Ahyar, Toton, Peggy Hartanto, Jeffry Tan, Adrian Gan, Eri Dani, Major Minor, Rani Hatta, Barli Asmara, Restu Anggraini
2020	Jakarta Fashion Week 2021	26-29 November 2020	Senayan City	(unknown)	Lulu Lutfi Labibi, Rinaldy A Yunardi, Toton, Yosafat Dwi Kurniawan, Albert Yanuar, Chitra Subiyakto, Restu Anggraini

== See also ==
- Indonesia Fashion Week
- List of fashion events
