= Kuei =

Kuei or Guǐ may refer to:

== People ==
- Kuei Chih-Hung (1937–1999), Chinese filmmaker
- Kuei Chin (1090–1155), chancellor of the Song dynasty
- Kuei Pin Yeo, Indonesian classical pianist and educator
- Kuei Ya Lei (born 1944), Chinese actress and singer
- Kuei Ling Ru, American high school chemistry teacher

== Other ==
- Catholic University of Eichstätt-Ingolstadt (Katholische Universität), Bavaria, Germany
- Kuei-chou or Guizhou, a southwestern province of the People's Republic of China
- Kuei River or Amu Darya, a river in Central Asia
- Kuih, a sweet Chinese dessert or snack made of rice
- Guǐ, a ghost in Chinese culture
