= Walraven 2 =

Dutch East Indies monoplane

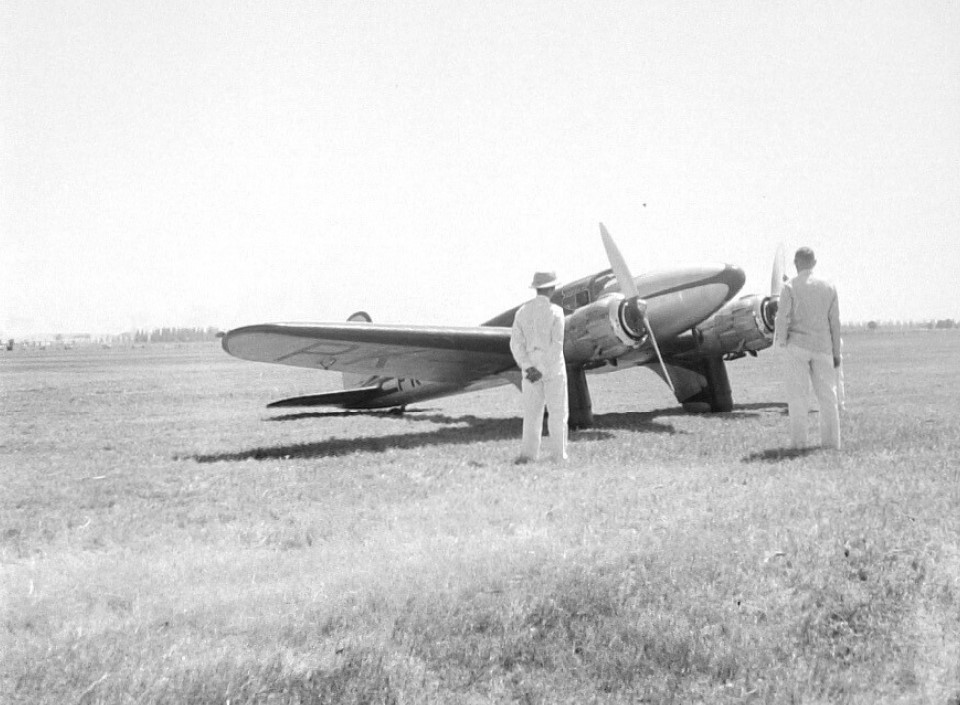
- Walraven 2 at Morokrembangan airfield, October 1936

General information
- Type: Twin-engined cabin monoplane
- National origin: Dutch East Indies (present Indonesia)
- Designer: L. W. Walraven
- Status: Destroyed
- Number built: 1

History
- First flight: 4 January 1935

The Walraven 2 was a Dutch East Indies (present day Indonesia), twin-engine cabin monoplane, commissioned by the Chinese-Indonesian aviation pioneer Khouw Khe Hien, designed by Laurens Walraven, and built by personnel of the Royal Netherlands East Indies Army Air Force during the 1930s.

== Design and development ==
The Walraven 2 was a two-seat low-wing cabin monoplane powered by two Pobjoy Niagara radial engines. Utilising a Göttingen 681 airfoil, the aircraft was designed by Laurens Walraven, who was Chief Engineer of the Royal Netherlands East Indies Army Air Force, to the specification of Khouw Khe Hien, son of the millionaire Khouw Kim Goan.

== Operational history ==
The aircraft first flew on 4 January 1935. It was registered as "PK-KKH". Finding the aircraft to be satisfactory, the younger Khouw intended to start an aircraft company in the Dutch East Indies, to build aircraft designed by Walraven. To promote this venture, the Walraven 2 was flown from the East Indies to the Netherlands and back at the end of 1935. His sister, Khouw Keng Nio, also made a name for herself by becoming the first woman of Chinese or colonial Indonesian nationality to become a certified pilot in March 1936.

However, the factory plan did not materialize after Khouw Khe Hien was killed in an air crash in February 1938. The aircraft was placed in storage at Andir airfield in Bandung shortly thereafter, and was destroyed on 19 February 1942 in a Japanese air attack.

== Specifications ==
Data from 1000aircraftphotos.com

General characteristics

- Crew: 2
- Length: 7.8 m (25 ft 7 in)
- Wingspan: 11 m (36 ft 1 in)
- Height: 2.15 m (7 ft 1 in)
- Wing area: 17.7 m^{2} (191 sq ft)
- Airfoil: Göttingen 681
- Empty weight: 626 kg (1,380 lb)
- Gross weight: 1,100 kg (2,425 lb)
- Powerplant: 2 × Pobjoy Niagara III seven-cylinder radial piston engine 7-cyl. air-cooled radial piston engine, 66 kW (88 hp) each

Performance

- Maximum speed: 250 km/h (160 mph, 130 kn)
- Cruise speed: 200 km/h (120 mph, 110 kn)
- Range: 1,800 km (1,100 mi, 970 nmi)
- Service ceiling: 6,000 m (20,000 ft)
