= Bandung High Tech Valley =

Indonesian technology initiative

Bandung High Tech Valley (BHTV) is an initiative to foster technology-based business and industries in the Bandung region. It aims to be the Silicon Valley of Indonesia.

The BHTV initiative originated with Indonesia's Ministry of Industry and Trade as a means to increase electronics exports. It was started in 1986, credited in part to the electrical engineer Samaun Samadikun, who that year founded ITB's Microelectronics Center and envisioned a high-tech hub in Bandung. The initiative was largely dormant after Indonesia's economic crisis of 1997, before being restarted by people associated with Institut Teknologi Bandung.

== Location ==
Bandung was chosen for the project because of its research centres and science and technology education, particularly through Institut Teknologi Bandung (ITB). ITB was established by the Indonesian government in 1959, tracing its origins to the Technische Hoogeschool te Bandoeng, founded in Bandung during the Dutch East Indies period in 1920. Over time, graduates and researchers from the university have contributed to the development of several technology-based companies located in Bandung, including PT Telkom (a telecommunications company whose headquarters and research centre are in the city), PT Inti (electronics and telecommunications manufacturer), LEN (National Electronic Institute), Omedata (IC bonding and packaging), PT Dirgantara Indonesia (formerly IPTN, Indonesia's only aircraft manufacturer), PT Kereta Api Indonesia (the state-owned railway and train manufacturing company) and several smaller local companies.

== History ==
The BHTV initiative has focused on helping small technology companies start up in Bandung and on attracting multinational companies to invest in research and development in the region.

In 2004, a BHTV expo was held, in which 70 companies, mostly in IT, took part.

On February 10, 2006, the BHTV Foundation was legally established by four ITB faculty members to oversee the further development of BHTV.
