= Indonesian Television Journalists Association =

The Indonesian Television Journalists Association (Indonesian: Ikatan Jurnalis Televisi Indonesia; IJTI) is an organization of journalists in Indonesia's privately owned channels RCTI, TPI, SCTV, Indosiar, and ANTV. It was established in August 1998, near the beginning of Indonesia's Reformation (Reformasi) period.

== Chairpersons ==
- Haris Jauhari (1998-2001)
