= Peggy Hartanto =

Indonesian fashion designer (born 1988)

- Born: 1988 (age 36–37); Surabaya, Indonesia
- Occupation: Fashion designer
- Known for: Co-founded ready-to-wear label Peggy Hartanto

Peggy Hartanto (born 1988) is an Indonesian fashion designer. She is the creative director of her eponymous ready-to-wear label Peggy Hartanto, which she co-founded in 2012.

== Early life and education ==
Born and raised in Surabaya, Indonesia, Hartanto studied at Raffles College of Design and Commerce in Sydney, Australia. She graduated in 2009 with an honor as the best student in fashion design. She briefly worked at one of Australia's leading fashion brands, Collette Dinnigan, before moving back to her hometown to start her own label.

== Career ==
Hartanto co-founded her high-end ready-to-wear label, PEGGY HARTANTO, with her two sisters, Lydia Hartanto and Petty Hartanto, in 2012. She now acts as the creative director of the brand, where she oversees its womenswear collection every season. The label is known for its definitive design aesthetic, which is characterized by clean lines, bold colors as well as innovative use of fabric and construction in its ready-to-wear offerings for women.

The first Peggy Hartanto collection was introduced at Jakarta Fashion Week in 2012. Since then, she has showcased her collections at various events and participated in trade shows worldwide. The label is now available at numerous boutiques and online retailers in Asia, Middle East and the United Kingdom.

Geena Davis wore Peggy Hartanto's fuchsia pink sleeveless on the show Late Night With Seth Meyers.

== Awards and honors ==
- 2017: The Woolmark Prize Asia Nominee
- 2016: Inclusion in the “30 Under 30: The Arts” List by Forbes Asia
- 2015: Grazia Next Glam Award Finalist from Grazia International Network
- 2014: Her World Young Achiever Award from Her World Indonesia
- 2013: Asia New Generation Fashion Designer Award from Harper's Bazaar Indonesia
