= Jim Geovedi =

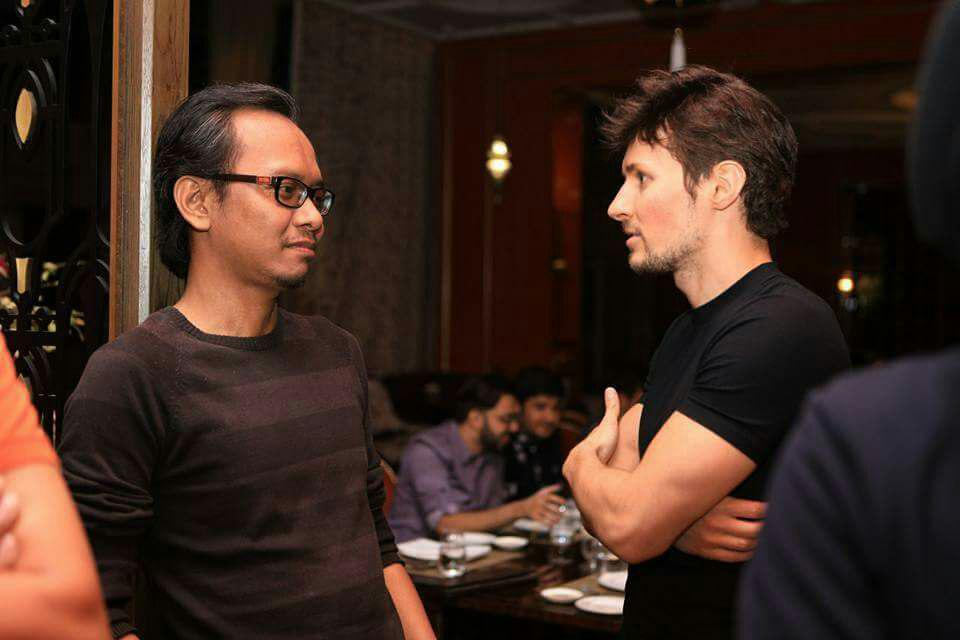
- Jim Geovedi and Pavel Durov
- Born: 28 June 1979 (age 47); Bandarlampung, Indonesia
- Citizenship: Indonesia
- Spouse: Yolanda Fox (m. 2008)
- Scientific career
- Fields: Computer science
- Musical career
- Genres: Techno; Tech house; Deep house
- Instruments: synthesiser; sampler; sequencer
- Years active: 2008–present
- Labels: Elektrax Recordings; Plus; LeftRight Sound
- Website: jim.geovedi.com

Jim Geovedi (born 28 June 1979), is an IT security expert from Indonesia who focuses on the discovery of computer and network security vulnerabilities. BBC News described him as a guy who "doesn't look like a Bond villain... but possesses secrets that some of them might kill for".

== Career ==
=== Information security ===
Geovedi co-founded and ran several IT security consulting companies. In 2001, he co-founded C2PRO Consulting, providing general IT consulting mostly for government agencies and, in 2004, co-founded Bellua Asia Pacific, (renamed Xynexis International later in 2010) and Noosc Global, a managed security services company. He was part of hackers group that began in 1996 called w00w00, where he met the future co-founder of Bellua, Anthony Zboralski.

He is currently based in London and has been interviewed on issues including: satellite security system, banking security and law enforcement.

=== Music ===
Geovedi is also a professional DJ and music producer currently signed with Elektrax Recordings, a Sydney-based Techno label.

==== Discography (as Jim Geovedi) ====
===== Singles =====
- Rontok, Elektrax, 2010
- Good, Elektrax, 2011

===== Remixes =====
- Minimalistik – Quasar (Jim Geovedi Remix), BDivision, 2010
- Neat – Taipei (Jim Geovedi Remix), BDivision, 2010
- Simone Barbieri Viale – So You (Jim Geovedi Remix), Elektrax, 2010
- DJ Hi-Shock – Asama Express (Jim Geovedi Remix), Elektrax, 2011

==== Discography (with SEGO) ====
===== Singles =====
- Jakarta To Tokyo, Plus Tokyo, 2008
- Bisikan Hati, BDivision, 2009
- Tarian Hujan, BDivision, 2009
- Flu Pagi, Plus Tokyo, 2009
- Trompetz, Backs/ash, 2009
- Tarian Hujan, BDivision, 2009
- A.S.A.L.F.O.K.A.L., Beatworks, 2009
- Playboy Duren Tiga, Cutz, 2009
- Darto Helm, SEGO, 2009
- Muke Loe Bapuk, SEGO, 2009
- Perut Buncit, SEGO, 2009
- Rocker Gagal, BDivision, 2009
- ADM/LSD/THC, SEGO, 2009
- Babon Botak, SEGO, 2009
- Sebisanya, LeftRight Sound, 2017
- Melapar, Android Muziq, 2017
- Misbar, Asia Music, 2017

===== Remixes =====
- Shin Nishimura – Fukafunkacid (SEGO ‘Miyabimania’ Remix), Plus Tokyo, 2008
- Da Others – Viva La Vida! (SEGO ‘Mi Vida Loca’ Remix), Pilot6 Recordings, 2009
- Mehdi D Vs. TheCrosh – Roda (SEGO ‘Roda Gila’ Remix), Cutz, 2009
- Tarot – Substance (SEGO Remix), TKC Music, 2009
- Alejandro Roman – Un Segundo De Tu Vida (SEGO Remix), Cutz, 2009
- Alejandro Roman – El Mundo Del Infinito (SEGO Remix), Cutz, 2009
- Andrea Saenz & Sebastian Reza – Sevilla! (SEGO Remix), Nine Records, 2009
- Tatsu Mihara – Comet (SEGO ‘Minimal Object’ Remix), Plus Tokyo, 2009
- Mhonoral – Voison (SEGO ‘Deus Ex Machina’ Remix), Plus Tokyo, 2009
- J.NO – No More Breath (SEGO Remix), BDivision, 2009
- Timmo – Shumminal (SEGO ‘Gitar Karatan’ Remix + Dub), BDivision, 2009
- Mario Roberti – Slave (Sego Birahi Tinggi Remix), BDivision, 2009
- Simone Barbieri Viale – Sunset (SEGO Remix), Cutz, 2009
- Simone Barbieri Viale – City Jungle (SEGO Remix), Cutz, 2009
- Diego Poblets – Massive Shock (SEGO Remix), Cutz, 2009
- Baramuda & Ginkel – Do It Wrong (Sego ‘Hit The Brick Wall’ Remix), Cutz, 2009
- Ilya Mosolov, Spacebird (SEGO Re-Busted), Cold Busted, 2009
- Ilya Mosolov, Light of Paradise (SEGO Re-Busted), Cold Busted, 2009
- Ilya Mosolov, Pax (SEGO Re-Busted), Cold Busted, 2009
- So Hattori, Tarot – No Limit (SEGO ‘Nambah Dua’ Remix), TKC Music, 2009
- Grunjah – Tighten Your Wings (SEGO ‘Too Tight’ Remix), Quimika, 2009
- Marlon D & Pete Lopez – She's Obsessed (SEGO Remix), TKC Music, 2009
- So Hattori & Tarot – No Limit (SEGO ‘Nambah Satu’ Remix), TKC Music, 2010
- Shin Nishimura – Phycedelic Technelic (SEGO Remix), Plus Tokyo, 2010
- SEGO – Magic Buffer (SEGO Remix), TKC Music, 2010

== Personal life ==
Geovedi was born in Bandarlampung, Lampung, Indonesia. After graduating from high school (1998-1999), he found himself living on the street without steady work. He later managed to teach himself computer security and programming, despite lacking formal education in the field. Media often use him as an example of how people can become successful in the IT industry by relying on their empirical knowledge and acumen, even without holding university degrees.

He is an Arsenal fan. He is also a fan of death metal and grindcore music. In an interview with Beritagar in 2013, Geovedi revealed that he is a fan of Napalm Death, Brutal Truth, Cannibal Corpse and Deicide.
