= Hendry Wijaya =

- Born: Medan, North Sumatra, Indonesia
- Education: Manhattan School of Music
- Occupations: pianist; academic
- Mother: Elly Lim
- Musical career
- Genres: classical music
- Instrument: piano
- Years active: 1996–present

Hendry Wijaya (born 1974) is an Indonesian-American classical pianist and academic (piano teacher).

He was born in Medan, Indonesia, on the island of Sumatra. At age 2, he began his studies with his Chinese Indonesian mother, Elly Lim. In 1991, he received a full scholarship to study at Boston Conservatory. The following year, as the recipient of the Dora Zaslavsky Koch Piano Scholarship, he was invited to study with Constance Keene, at Manhattan School of Music, where he earned Bachelor of Music, Master of Music, and Doctor of Musical Arts degrees.

In 1996 he won Artists International’s “Young Artist Piano Award” and made his critically acclaimed New York Recital debut at Carnegie Hall. He has since performed in many major concert halls, including Lincoln Center for the Performing Arts, Steinway Hall, Merkin Concert Hall, Wheeler Opera House, Bösendorfer Saal in Vienna, and the Jakarta Performing Arts Center.

He is Head of the Piano Department at the Westminster Conservatory of Music in Princeton, New Jersey and the Advisor for the E.L.M.S. Conservatory in Jakarta. He is a past president of the New Jersey Music Teachers Association and the President of the New York State Music Teachers Association. In 2019 he received the MTNA Foundation Fellow Award for his significant contribution to the teaching profession and the world of music. He is also the author of an advice column for Staccato, the only monthly music education magazine in Indonesia.

He currently resides in New York and Jakarta.
