= Siti Munjiyah =

Indonesian women's movement activist (1896–1955)

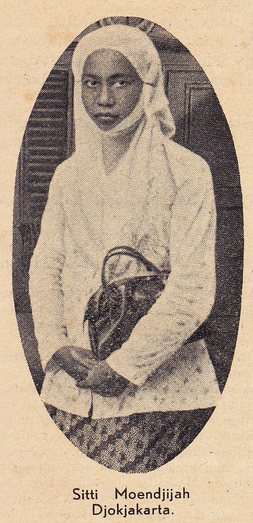
- Portrait of Munjiyah in Suara Aisyiyah
- Born: 1896; Kauman village, Yogyakarta, Dutch East Indies
- Died: 1955 (aged 58–59); Tasikmalaya, West Java Province, Indonesia
- Education: Madrasah diniyah
- Organization: Aisyiyah

Siti Munjiyah (Ejaan Van Ophuijsen: Sitti Moendjijah, 1896–1955) was an Indonesian figure of the women's movement and the chair of the Aisyiyah central leadership council. She participated in the First Indonesian Women's Congress.

== Biography ==
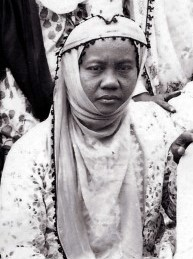
Siti Munjiyah

Munjiyah was born in 1896 in Kauman village, Yogyakarta, Dutch East Indies. She was the sixth child of Raden Haji Lurah Hasjim, a courtier in the Kraton Ngayogyakarta Hadiningrat royal palace complex, and Nyi Hajjah Khadijah. She was the sister of Ulama Bagoes Hadikoesoemo [id]. She was a Muslim and was educated at the Madrasah diniyah [id].

Munjiyah participated in the First Indonesian Women's Congress (Indonesian: Kongres Perempuan Indonesia [id]) in 1928. She served as deputy chair of the congress and gave a speech arguing for Indonesian women's emancipation that maintained cultural and religious traditions and was distinct from the women's movements of the West.

Munjiyah was the chair of the Aisyiyah central leadership council, an Islamic non-governmental organization dedicated to female empowerment and charitable work, from 1932 to 1936.

Munjiyah died in 1955 in Tasikmalaya, West Java Province, Indonesia.

In 2021, it was proposed that Munjiyah and Siti Umniyah be appointed as a national heroes.
