= Khouw Keng Nio =

Chinese-Indonesian aviator, heiress and businesswoman

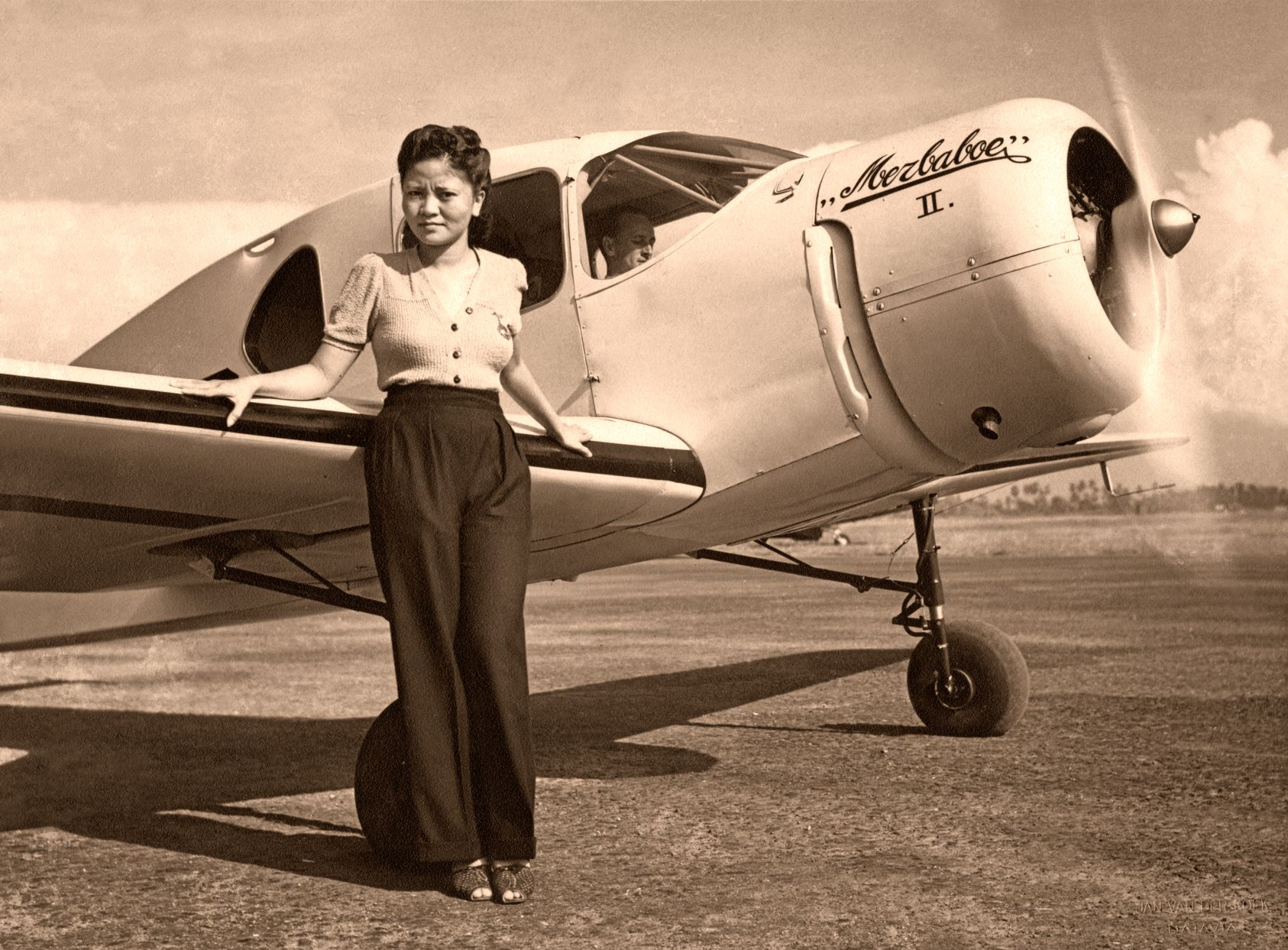
Khouw Keng Nio leaning against an airplane of the "Merbaboe" family business.

Khouw Keng Nio was a colonial Chinese-Indonesian heiress and businesswoman, best known as the first woman in both Indonesia and China to become a licensed pilot.

Born in Java, Dutch East Indies, Khouw came from a wealthy Peranakan business family. Her father, the entrepreneur Khouw Kim Goan, founded N.V. Merbaboe, a large livestock, milk and beverage conglomerate in late colonial Indonesia; and her mother was an indigenous Indonesian woman. Her better-known brother, Khouw Khe Hien (1907-1938), also a pioneering aviator, initially envisaged air transportation for the company's products as a more efficient alternative to land and sea transportation. This grew into a full-blown obsession, which ended with Khouw's brother causing an international sensation in 1935, when he flew his Indonesian-built airplane, Walraven 2, in a 20-day-long journey from Bandung to Schiphol, Amsterdam, and onwards to other European destinations.

Around the same time, Khouw Keng Nio also caused a sensation in the Dutch and Indonesian press by training as a pilot, qualifying in March 1936, thereby becoming both the first Indonesian and the first Chinese woman aviator.

When her brother died in a plane accident in Batavia in 1938, Khouw Keng Nio took over the reins of N.V. Merbaboe. Under her tutelage, the company maintained its headquarters in Batavia, but expanded, opening branches in Bogor, Bandung and Sukabumi. Her company employed over 300 workers, and slaughtered between 75 and 80 cows daily to meet the needs of around 40,000 consumers, extending from hotels and restaurants to the colonial shipping fleet and army. Her yearly tax bill amounted to the extraordinary sum of f. 100,000.
