= Ade Rai =

Indonesian bodybuilder (born 1970)

I Gusti Agung Kusuma Yudha Rai
- Professional bodybuilder

Personal info
- Born: May 6, 1970 (age 55); Jakarta, Indonesia

Best statistics
- Height: 183 cm (6 ft 0 in)
- Weight: 90 kg (198 lb)

Professional (Pro) career
- Best win: Musclemania World Professional 2000
Medal record
Gold medal – first place	1997 SEA Games	Bodybuilding

Ade Rai (born I Gusti Agung Kusuma Yudha Rai; 6 May 1970) is an Indonesian professional natural bodybuilder.

In 1994, Ade Rai won his first national bodybuilding title at age 24. His first international title was in 1995, when he won the Mr. Asia bodybuilding competition in Hong Kong. In 1996, he won the Musclemania World USA. The following year, he won gold medal for Indonesia at the 1997 Southeast Asian Games in Jakarta. In 2000, he concluded his career on the professional competition circuit, winning the Superbody World Championship USA, as well a his second Musclemania World title.

A successful entrepreneur in Indonesia, Ade Rai owns "Rai Fitness" fitness/bodybuilding gym chains throughout the country, including a restaurant. He is also the co-founder of Rai Institute. He is often called "the father of Indonesian bodybuilding" and is a vocal advocate of drug-free bodybuilding.
