= Abdul Rasyid Kacong =

Indonesian admiral

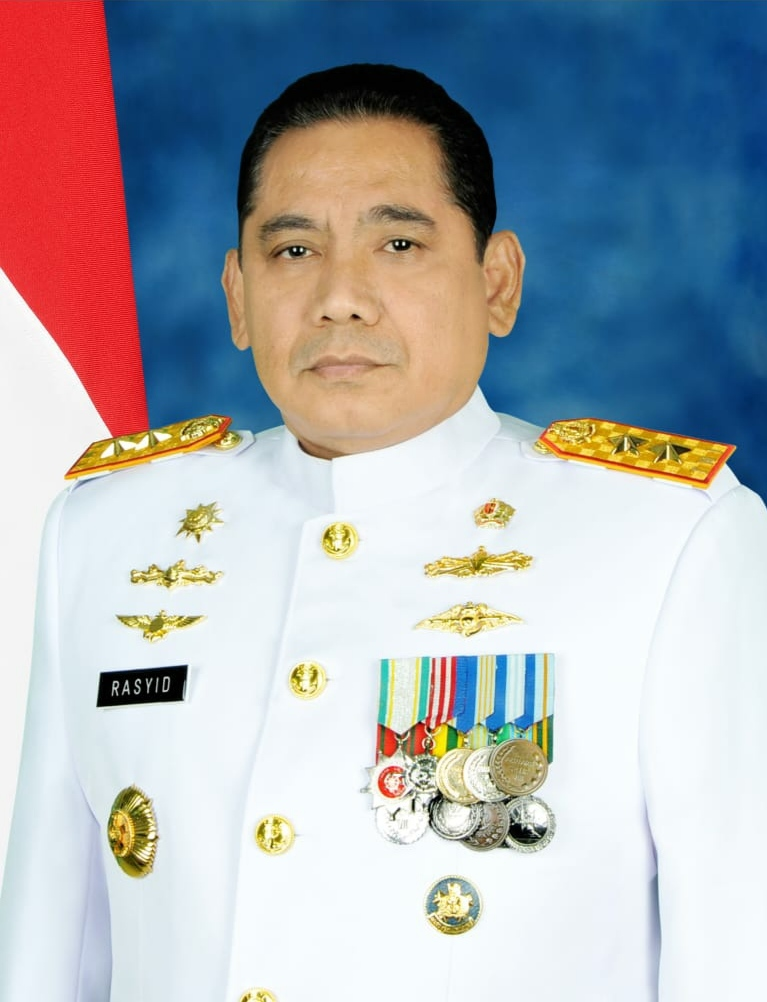
- Born: 28 September 1964 (age 62); Sinjai, South Sulawesi, Indonesia
- Military career
- Allegiance: Indonesia
- Branch: Indonesian Navy
- Service years: 1988–2022
- Rank: Rear Admiral
- Commands: Senior Officer of Indonesian Navy

Abdul Rasyid Kacong (born 28 October 1965) is a rear admiral in the Indonesian Navy who served as a senior officer (Indonesian: Perwira Tinggi) to the Asrena Kasal. The last position of this three-star general was commander of the Fleet Command I.

== Career ==
He graduated from the AAL-33 TA Naval Academy in 1988. He has served various assignments both on warships and on staff.

Abdul Rasyid Kacong held the role in charge of finding the wreck of the Sriwijaya Air plane that crashed in the waters of the Thousand Islands, Jakarta. He led the Indonesian Navy forces with 10 ships at night in the search for Sriwijaya Air SJ182 on 9 January. He served as the commander of the Fleet Command I in the search for the Sriwijaya Air SJ182 plane that crashed on Laki Island, Sunday, 10 January 2021. A team of divers from the Indonesian Navy was also deployed in the search process. The Navy have prepared KRI Dishidros, who has the capability in conducting underwater searches.

== Position ==
- Palaksa KRI Imam Bonjol
- Commander of KRI Pulau Rangsang
- Commander of KRI Teluk Celukan Bawang
- Commander of KRI Teuku Umar
- Commander Lanal Ranai
- Asops Danlantamal IV/Tanjungpinang
- Asops Danguspurlabar
- Commander Lanal Banten
- Koarmabar Kolat Commander
- Asops Pangolinlamil (2012)
- Sahli C Ops Pangarmbar
- Commander of Guskamlabar (2014–2015)
- Special Staff of the chief of staff (2015–2016)
- Deputy Kapuspen TNI (2016–2017)
- Kadisopslatal (2017–2019)
- Danlantamal I/Medan (2019–2020)
- Pankolinlamil (2020)
- Commander of the Fleet I (2020–2021)
- Asrena Kasal (2021–present)

== See also ==
- Indonesian military ranks
