= Khouw Khe Hien =

Chinese-Indonesian aviation pioneer

Khouw Khe Hien (1907–1938) was a Chinese-Indonesian aviation pioneer, businessman and millionaire heir. He is best remembered today for commissioning Walraven 2, the first aeroplane manufactured in the Dutch East Indies, now Indonesia.

== Biography ==
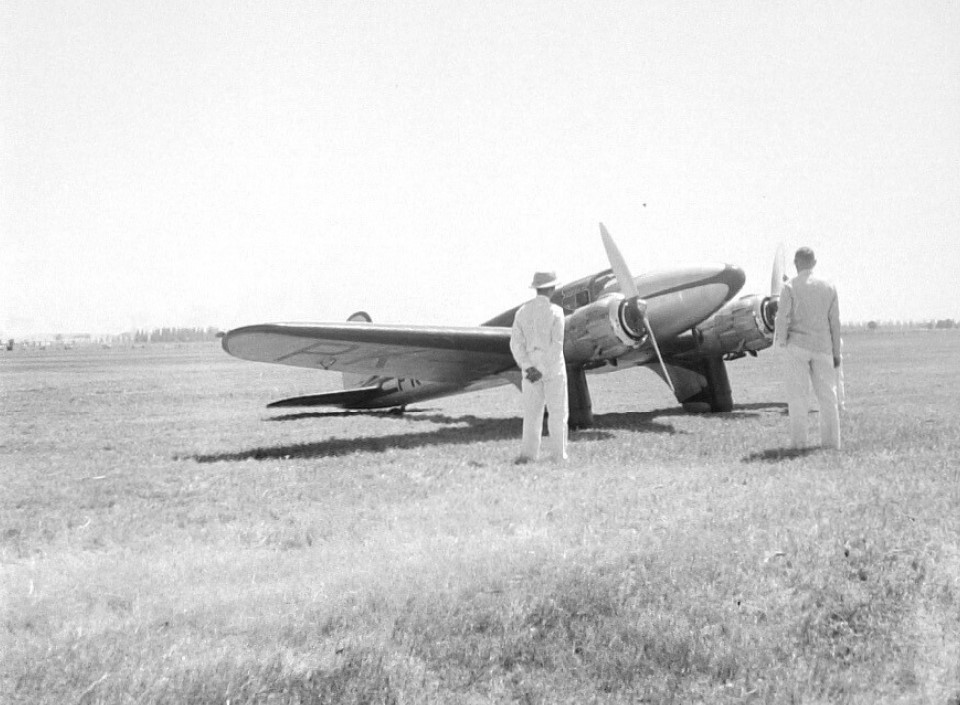
Khouw Khe Hien with the aircraft he commissioned and flew, Walraven 2 (October 1936).

Born on August 29, 1907, in Muntilan, Central Java, Khouw came from a wealthy Peranakan business family. His father, the entrepreneur Khouw Kim Goan, founded N.V. Merbaboe Bedrijven, a large livestock, milk and beverage conglomerate in late colonial Indonesia; and his mother was a pribumi Indonesian woman. He also had a younger sister, Keng Nio, who became noteworthy in her own right as an aviator and businesswoman.

Khouw Khe Hien was educated at the Europeesche Lagere School (ELS) in Magelang, then at the Meer Uitgebreid Lager Onderwijs (MULO) in Yogyakarta; only elite non-Europeans were allowed at both institutions.

Khouw first became interested in aviation when he realized its potential as a more efficient alternative to land and sea transportation for the family company's many fresh products. To this end, he placed an order in March 1934 for an aircraft from Laurens Walraven, Achmad bin Talim and others, who were technicians in the Luchtvaartafdeling or 'Aviation Service' of the Royal Netherlands East Indies Army Air Force. Khouw's order specified that the aircraft was to be a twin-engined cabin monoplane, able to carry a cargo of 130 kg and to fly over long distances. Built and assembled at Walraven's private workshop in Bandung, West Java, Khouw's aircraft was finished towards the end of 1934, and was christened Walraven 2.

Khouw, who in the meantime had trained as a certified pilot, was so satisfied with Walraven 2 that he made plans for an aircraft factory. In order to gain more publicity, Lieutenant C. Terluin and Khouw, as co-pilot, flew the new aircraft from Batavia, the capital of colonial Indonesia, to Schiphol, Netherlands. A media sensation, the 20-day-long journey was extensively covered on each of its stops, from Singapore to Rangoon, through Calcutta and Aleppo, and on to its final destination. Walraven 2 arrived at Schiphol, Amsterdam to a rapturous welcome; among others, the Indonesian-born Anthony Fokker, founder of the aircraft manufacturer Fokker, was there to greet Khouw and Terluin.

In 1937, Khouw also made an equally well-publicized trip on Walraven 2 from Batavia to Hong Kong, and on to Guangzhou, Nanjing and Shanghai in China. He was welcomed at his ancestral country by the then Chinese president, Chiang Kai-shek.

Early the following year, however, on February 26, 1938, Khouw was involved in a fatal accident in Cililitan, while flying a Glenn Martin bomber 506 during a blackout exercise. His remains were buried at his native hometown of Muntilan in Central Java.

== Private life ==
Khouw's mother died in Batavia two months after him in April 1938. His sister, Khouw Keng Nio, took the reins of the family business and expanded it.

Khouw Khe Hien was also survived by his widow, Lena Oey Non Nio (1906-1994), and four children, Khouw Teng Han, Khouw Teng Hwa, Khouw Teng Giok and Khouw Teng Hwie, who all eventually migrated to the Netherlands.
