= Haswandi =

Indonesian judge

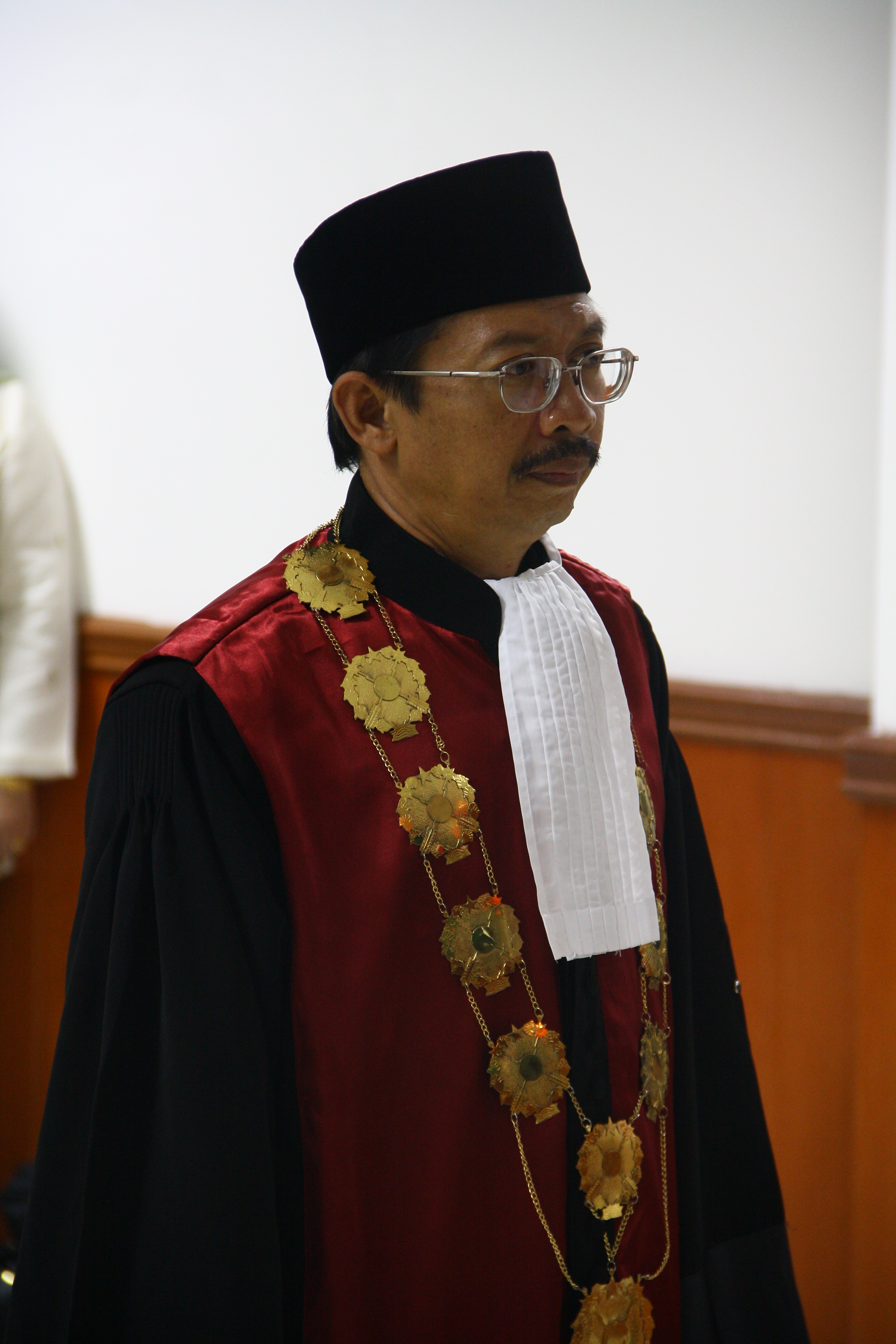
- Born: 2 May 1961 (age 64); Payakumbuh, West Sumatra
- Occupation: Judge
- Known for: Executive positions in West Jakarta and South Jakarta courts

Haswandi, SH, MHum (born 2 April 1961) has been an Indonesian judge, Vice President of the Court of West Jakarta and is now the Chairman of the South Jakarta District Court.

Haswandi was a career judge in public courts under the Supreme Court of the Republic of Indonesia, where he decided and resolved criminal cases and civil cases. He next served as Vice President of the Court of West Jakarta and is now Chairman of the South Jakarta District Court.
