= Biyan Wanaatmadja =

- Born: Biyan Wanaatmadja; October 20, 1954 (age 71); Surabaya, East Java, Indonesia
- Education: Mueller & Sohn Privat Mode Schule (1977), London College of Fashion (1982)
- Occupation: Fashion designer
- Years active: 1984–present
- Known for: Founder of BIYAN, Studio 133, and Biyan Bride

Biyan Wanaatmadja or biyan born in Surabaya, Jawa Timur, 20 October 1954. The most prominent and high end fashion designer living in Indonesia.

== Private life ==
Born from Surya Wanaatmadja and Elizabeth Jonathan, Wanaatmadja spent his childhood and youth at Surabaya.

He pursued his studies in fashion, earning himself degrees at Mueller & Sohn Privat Mode Schule in 1977 at Düsseldorf, Germany and then the London College of Fashion in 1982 at London, England. In 1983, Biyan worked at Enrico Coveri di Firenze, Italia. After living in Europe for more than 15 years, Biyan's family asked him to come back to Indonesia and start his own private label. Working in a small atelier in Surabaya, Biyan produced and retailed his first clothing line.

Now Biyan holds 3 label: BIYAN (est. 1984), Studio 133 by Biyan (est. 1985), and Biyan Bride . A custom-made Biyan gown now retails from a price of US$10,000 to $20,000

Biyan label is one of the top Indonesian designer that sells Internationally, such as to Club 21, Saks Fifth Avenue, and Bloomingdale's.
