= Mak Erot =

Mak Erot (1878 – 5 July 2008) was a woman from West Java, Indonesia. She was widely known for helping men to lengthen their penises using traditional herbs and prayers.

Her age is disputed; various sources have described her as between 101 and 130 years old. Her story has been made into a number of plays and movies, such as XL (Extra Large: Between Me, You and Mak Erot) starring Francine Roosenda. She died in July 2008 in Caringin village, west Java.
