= Haris Jauhari =

Indonesian journalist

- Born: May 1, 1960 (age 66); Jakarta, Indonesia
- Occupation: Senior Journalist

Haris Jauhari is an Indonesian journalist, born in Jakarta, May 1, 1960.

== Biography ==
Haris was the chairman of Ikatan Jurnalis Televisi Indonesia - IJTI for the 1998–2001 term. He was also the chairman of Indonesian Journalists' Protection Committee and was a chairman of Journalistic Section in the Indonesia Chambers of Commerce.

He has served several of Indonesia's newspapers such as Prioritas, Pikiran Rakyat, Investor Daily and has also held the position of general manager for Investor Magazine.

Haris held many positions in TV Broadcasting:

- Chief Editor of Televisi Pendidikan Indonesia - TPI and Executive Producer & Host of the talk show Partai Partai
- Corporate Secretary of OkeVision, TrenTV, and Global TV
- Hosted the political talk show Demi Bangsa

== Bibliography ==
- Silver Screen: 90 Years of Movie Theaters in Indonesia (2008)

== Today ==
Haris is currently the Senior Consultant of the National Communications Institute and is active in the National Media Practitioners Communications Forum.
