= Febian Nurrahman Saktinegara =

Indonesian film director (born 1990)

- Born: 1990 (age 35–36); Jakarta, Indonesia
- Occupations: Film director, Cinematographer, Editor
- Style: Non-narrative films

Febian Nurrahman Saktinegara (born 1990) is an Indonesian film director known for specialising in time-lapse photography and non-narrative films.

== Biography ==
He was born in Jakarta in 1990 and went to SMA 28 Jakarta High School. Later on, he joined ITB (Institute Technology of Bandung) and studied at the Department of Arts and Design.

== Early works ==
His earlier short films have received industry recognition and include:

- Shortlisted film and nominee at "SBM Golden Lens", Erasmus Huis, Jakarta.
- Special artist at "2011 ASEAN-Korea Multimedia Competition", Gallery LOOP, Korea.
- "Bazaar Art 2011", GF Pacific Place, Jakarta.
- "Sinemars", Blitz Megaplex, PVJ, Bandung.
- "Voice Of Young Indonesian Filmmakers", @America, Pacific Place, Jakarta.
- Marion Bloem's Vrijheid-Freedom-Libertad project

His short film Merangkum Jakarta (a Journey Through Jakarta), is described as a summary of Jakarta with its video divided into 4 parts; Dynamic, "Jakarta-on-the-go", Light and Building (Timelapse Journey through Jakarta), Playground and Human.

== Current projects ==
He began work on the film Epic Java, in late 2011. It expanded on themes in his earlier works. It is a 30-minute non-narrative film that focuses on the mountainous region in West Java, Indonesia. As the director, he explores and records the amazing moments that occur from East to West Java using DSLR cameras with time-lapse photography and slowmotion. The footage was shot with a Canon 5D Mark II and a Canon 550D. Two teaser clips have been uploaded on YouTube and Vimeo, with discussions in various social media. Epic Java was one of the video opener at the opening of Financial Inclusion activities Week / Indonesia Banking Expo (IBEX) 2012 which was opened by Indonesian Vice President Boediono.

This project is following in the footsteps of other independent films in Indonesia and is raising funds using a crowdfunding platform for the creative industry in Indonesia, WUJUDKAN. Production of the film Epic Java cost Rp 50 million.
