= Ridwan Kodiat =

Indonesian bodybuilder

Ridwan Kodiat (born July 11, 1951), won consecutive national championships from 1972 to 1989 and was the first bodybuilder from Indonesia to perform in an international bodybuilding championship. He was the runner up in New Delhi, India 1977 and two years later in Manila, Philippines he also the runner up after Abas Hindawi (Third World Champion of 1978). In Jakarta's SEA Games 1977, he won the title for heavy weight class.
