= Maissy =

Indonesian singer and physician

Pramaisshela Arinda Daryono Putri (born March 23, 1990, Jakarta), known under stage name Maissy, is a former Indonesian child singer. She studied medicine at University of Indonesia in 2013. She is currently a doctor in a hospital in Jakarta. She married Riky Febriansyah, her friend in the Faculty of Medicine of the University of Indonesia on January 31, 2014.

== Discography ==
- Ci...Luk...Baaa...! (1998)
