= Nol van der Vin =

Indonesian footballer

Arnold van der Vin
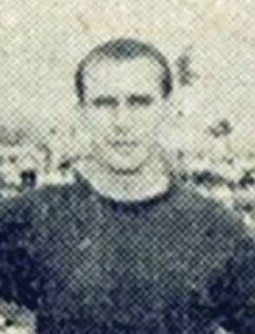

Personal information
- Full name: Arnold Wouter van der Vin
- Place of birth: Semarang, Indonesia
- Height: 1.94 m (6 ft 4 in)
- Position: Goalkeeper

Youth career
- Ajax

Senior career*
Years	Team	Apps	(Gls)
1939–1946	Excelsior Surabaya	150	(0)
1946–1947	UMS 1905	23	(0)
1948–1954	Persija Jakarta	102	(0)
1954–1955	Fortuna '54	45	(0)
1955–1956	PSMS Medan	33	(0)
1956–1961	Penang FA	26	(0)
Total		379	(0)

International career
1952	Indonesia	48	(0)
- * Club domestic league appearances and goals

Arnold Wouter van der Vin, nicknamed Nol, is an Indonesian former footballer who played as a goalkeeper who represented the Indonesia national team.

== Career ==
Van der Vin was the second player after Mo Heng Tan to play in goal for newly independent Indonesia. He made his unofficial debut for Indonesia in a match against South China AA of Hong Kong on 27 July 1952.

In 1955, he earned a transfer to Fortuna '54, to replace the injured Frans de Munck, then the goalkeeper of the Netherlands national team. The next year, he returned to play for PSMS Medan.

== Honours ==
Persija Jakarta

- Perserikatan: 1953–54

VBO Batavia

- Dutch East Indies Championship: 1947, 1948
