= Tex Saverio =

Indonesian fashion designer (born 1984)

Tex Saverio (born 28 August 1984, in Jakarta) is an Indonesian fashion designer.

In September 2005, Saverio won a national award in the Mercedes-Benz Asia Fashion Award, which qualified him to compete against other Southeast Asian designers the following year. His winning collection presented clothes that were designed to be worn by both men and women. He left senior school after a year in order to pursue a fashion design career, enrolling at the Bunka Fashion School in Jakarta and then taking on an apprenticeship at the Phalie Studio.

Since then, Saverio's work has been worn by international celebrities such as Ayumi Hamasaki (the dress worn in the music video of How Beautiful You Are), Lady Gaga (who chose to wear Saverio for her Lady Gaga Fame advertising campaign) and Kim Kardashian. Lady Gaga was photographed in a sheer black laser-cut and sequined Saverio dress called 'La Glacon' for Harper's Bazaar in 2011. The dramatic metal-and-chiffon wedding dress which Jennifer Lawrence wore in advance publicity material for The Hunger Games: Catching Fire film was designed by Saverio. He has been described as the "Alexander McQueen of Indonesia".
