= Samaun Samadikun =

Indonesian scientist (1931–2006)

- Born: 15 April 1931; Magetan, East Java, Dutch East Indies
- Died: 15 November 2006 (aged 75); Jakarta, Indonesia
- Education: Institut Teknologi Bandung; Stanford University
- Occupations: Scientist, engineer, teacher
- Scientific career
- Fields: Electrical engineering, Semiconductors
- Workplaces: Institut Teknologi Bandung; Indonesian Institute of Sciences

Samaun Samadikun (15 April 1931 – 15 November 2006) was an Indonesian electrical engineer.

== Early life ==
Samaun was born on 15 April 1931 in Magetan. He was the fourth child of Dutch East Indies civil service Samadikun, later became East Java governor, and Mubandi. Samaun was maternally a descendant of Sultan Hamengkubuwono I. As a teenager, Samaun knew radio transceiver in details and helped Tentara Genie Pelajar (Engineering Teenage Army) applying radio.

Samaun attended Tweede Europesche School (primary school) in Ponorogo and Kediri. He then continued his study to secondary school in Kediri and Madiun. His high school was in Surabaya and he graduated in 1951.

== Career ==
Samaun studied at Engineering Faculty of Universitas Indonesia branch Bandung (later became Institut Teknologi Bandung) funded by the Education, Pedagogy, and Culture Ministry. He then graduated in October 1955 obtaining insinyur (bachelor's degree). After graduating, he became the student assistant at engineering physics ITB for two months starting on 1 October. Samaun was awarded a scholarship by International Cooperation Administration to continue his study at Stanford University. In December, he went to United States leaving his position in ITB. He began his study on 3 January 1956. He graduated on 16 June 1957 obtaining Master of Science in Electrical Engineering.

After completing his master program, on 16 August 1957 Samaun became expert assistant at Engineering Faculty, ITB. On 1 June 1960, his position was Junior Lecturer at Engineering Sciences Department.

Samaun also broadened his knowledge in nuclear engineering studying postgraduate diploma for one year at Queen Mary College in London graduating in September 1960. He immediately went to Karlsruhe, Germany to take a course at Siemens & Halske Aktiengesellschaft from 17 October 1960 to 31 October 1961. In 1962, Samaun served as member of Panitia Penasihat Pembangunan Pusat Research Nasional, Majelis Ilmu Pengetahuan Indonesia (MIPI; which later merged with Lembaga Research National as LIPI). Since 1 January 1963, Samaun became Senior Lecturer at Mechanical and Electrical Engineering Department. In this year he also became Head of Electronics and Component Laboratorium until 1968. In 1964, he was appointed as First Assistant Dean at the department. This year, Samaun also became Head of Payload Instrumentation Section at Lembaga Penerbangan dan Antariksa Nasional (LAPAN). In LAPAN's Proyek Roket Ilmiah Militer Awal (PRIMA; Initial Military Scientific Rocket Project), Samaun was appointed as Head of Telemetry Team and Wiranto Arismunandar was at propulsion team. After Keputusan Presiden RI No. 72 Tahun 1965 was issued, Samaun and Arismunandar were two of 18 scientists and engineers who were instructed by the president to learn about rockets in Japan for preparation of launching of Kartika rocket in August 1965. In April 1965, Samaun studied about payload transmission at Nomura Laboratorium for three months. From 1965 to 1969, Samaun served as Vice Director of Lembaga Elektronika Nasional, one of LIPI subdivision.

In 1968, he continued his study to doctoral program which was also at Stanford but was funded by International Atomic Energy Agency (IAEA) and Stanford University National Aeronautical and Space Administration Research Grant. During 1968-9 Samaun also was appointed as Vice Dean for Academic Affairs at Mechanical and Electrical Engineering Department, ITB. Samaun then graduated on 13 September 1971 after presenting his dissertation titled An Integrated Circuit Piezoresistive Pressure Sensor for Biomedical Instrumentation. After graduating, he added his father name to his name to be Samaun Samadikun. In 1971, he also became Head Lecturer at Engineering Faculty, ITB.

During 1973–8, Samaun was appointed as Director of Academical Mediums Development at Directorate General of Higher Education, Department of Education, Pedagogy, and Culture. He then served as Director General of Power at Department of Mining and Energy for five years later. In 1985, Samaun returned as Head of Electronics and Component Laboratorium. On 1 April, he became Director of Inter-University Center.

Samaun was one of founders of Islamic World Academy of Sciences along with Arismunandar and Baiquni on 29 October 1986. They were granted Founding Fellow status. Samaun served as Head of LIPI from 1989 to 1994.

In 1991, Samaun served as the main commissioner of PT LEN Industri. He was member of Majelis Permusyawaratan Rakyat from 1991 to 1997 as group representative. Since 9 August 1993, Samaun became Professor in Electronics at Institut Teknologi Indonesia. On 17 August 1996, Samaun and his 4 friends founded Yayasan Nuswantara Mulya. In 2001, he retired as government employees.

Samadikun started his career as a lecturer at the ITB in 1957 teaching Electromagnetic Field Theory. He was promoted as the full professor of Electronics Engineering in 1974 and was chairman of the Electrical Engineering Department at Bandung Institute of Technology. He sat in central government department position as Director Binsarak DIKTI in 1973-1978 and later as the Director-General of Energy at Department of Energy and Mines from 1978 - 1983. Having served as the first director of the Center for Inter-University (PAU) Mikroelektronika ITB from 1984 to 1989, he took a sabbatical from ITB to sit in as the head of the Indonesian Institute of Sciences (LIPI) in 1989 to 1995. During his tenure, he received a number of awards.

After finishing his term at LIPI, Samadikun decided to return to teach in the Department of Electrical Engineering at ITB and to do research at PAU Mikroelektronika. He was appointed as the Principal Researcher at PPAU Mikroelektronika ITB since 2001 until his death in 2006.

== Later life and death ==
In October 2004, after falling ill, Samadikun underwent surgery in Perth, Australia. After his return from Perth, he went back to continue to work at Bandung Institute of Technology as chief scientist and researcher. He suffered from the same health problem again in September 2006 and subsequently underwent intensive medical care for some time.

He died on 15 November 2006 at 9:51 AM at MMC Hospital due to brain cancer in Jakarta and buried the next day with a military ceremony at the Kalibata Heroes' Cemetery after staying at Widya Graha Building, LIPI Jakarta.

Samaun married Roesdiningsih on 12 September 1957 and had two children. One is called Samawi Samadikun, and a grandson named Samarfi Samadikun who's studying at Mentari International School.

== Vision ==
In the 1970s, he proposed to Indonesian government and industries at the time to do research and development of microelectronic devices domestically. His proposal and dream never got realized until his death. During his life, he was never tired to dream that someday there would be chip fabrication industries built in Indonesia. He was also active in the planning of Bandung High Tech Valley (BHTV) which tries to replicate the success of California's Silicon Valley in Indonesia.

== Works ==
In 1961, Samaun's paper Random Fluctuation in a Nuclear Reactor was published under Nature.

Samadikun held a patent (US Patent No 3,888,708), along with his colleague at Stanford University, K.D. Wise, for the Method for forming regions of predetermined in silicon dated 10 June 1975.

== Awards ==
In 1963, Governor of West Java acknowledged Samaun for his contribution to TV broadcasting development in West Java. Indonesian government has awarded Samaun Satya Lencana Karya Satya Class I in 1984 and Mahaputera Star Class III (Bintang Mahaputera Utama) in 1994. Chairman of Harapan Kita Foundation in 1984 gave the acknowledgement for Samaun's work in medical instrumentation helping the establishment of Harapan Kita Hospital. In 1991, Minister of Defense/Commander of Armed Force awarded him Satya Lencana Dwidyasistha. In the same year, Samaun received Science Award (Hadiah Ilmu Pengetahuan) from Department of Education and Culture, Adhikara Rekayasa from Persatuan Insinyur Indonesia, and Meritorious Service Award from ASEAN-COST. In 1998, Samaun received ASEAN Science and Technology Award. In 2001, ITB Rector acknowledged Samaun for his dedication for ITB from 16 August 1957 to 1 May 2001. Department of Energy and Mineral Resources awarded him Dharma Elektrika Madya in 2003.

== Legacy ==
In 2007, Samaun's name was dedicated for multipurpose room at Directorate General of Electricity and Power, Department of Energy and Mineral Resources.

On 15 April 2016, Google celebrated his 85th birthday with a Google Doodle.

== Bibliography ==
- Soegiarto, Kinarti A.; Iswanti, Setya; Setiorini, Retno Asihanti, eds. (2007). Profesor Samaun Samadikun: Sang Petani Silikon Indonesia. Jakarta: LIPI Press. ISBN 9789797991371.
