= Kuei Pin Yeo =

Indonesian pianist

- Education: Manhattan School of Music
- Occupation: Classical pianist

Chinese name
- Traditional Chinese: 楊圭斌
- Simplified Chinese: 杨圭斌
- Hanyu Pinyin: Yáng Guībīn
- Hokkien POJ: Iûⁿ Kuipin

Kuei Pin Yeo is a classical pianist and educator from Indonesia. She earned Indonesia's first doctorate in music.

== Early life ==
She was born in Jakarta, Indonesia and later earned a full scholarship to the Manhattan School of Music in New York City, where she received the Bachelor of Music (1976), Master of Music (1978), Master of music Education (1979) and Doctor of Musical Arts (1981) degrees. She became the first Indonesian to earn a Doctor of Musical Arts degree in piano. Yeo was a grantee of the John D. Rockefeller 3rd Fund/Asian Cultural Council and Helena Rubinstein Foundation for many years.

== Accolades ==
The New York Times hailed her as "both polished technician and responsive musician" and praised her "elegantly detailed...immaculate, musically direct interpretation" following her Carnegie Hall debut. Other critics have called her as a "fantastic pianist!" because she 'handled the virtuoso complexity with a magnificent beauty and deep sensitivity'. The Jakarta Post said "To describe Kuei Pin Yeo's technique as amazing is putting it rather mildly".

Yeo's list of accomplishment includes winning the Harold Bauer Award, founding Jakarta Music School, Camerata di Musica Jakarta, serving as artistic and music director of ASEAN International Concerto Competition and performing at Jakarta International Summer Music Festival. She has been on most TV stations in Indonesia and Singapore and was interviewed and performed in WQXR, WNCN of New York City, and Voice of America in Washington DC. She is on the jury of many international competitions.
