= Anne Avantie =

Indonesian fashion designer

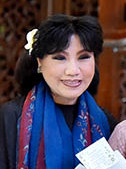
- Born: Sianne Avantie; 20 May 1964 (age 62); Semarang, Central Java, Indonesia
- Occupations: Fashion designer; businesswoman
- Website: anneavantie.com

Sianne Avantie (born May 20, 1964), better known as Anne Avantie, is an Indonesian fashion designer and contemporary kebaya pioneer. Her kebaya has been known on an international scale and is often worn by Indonesian models and celebrities, also a number of beauty queens who have come to Indonesia, one of which is Miss Universe.

== Early life and career ==
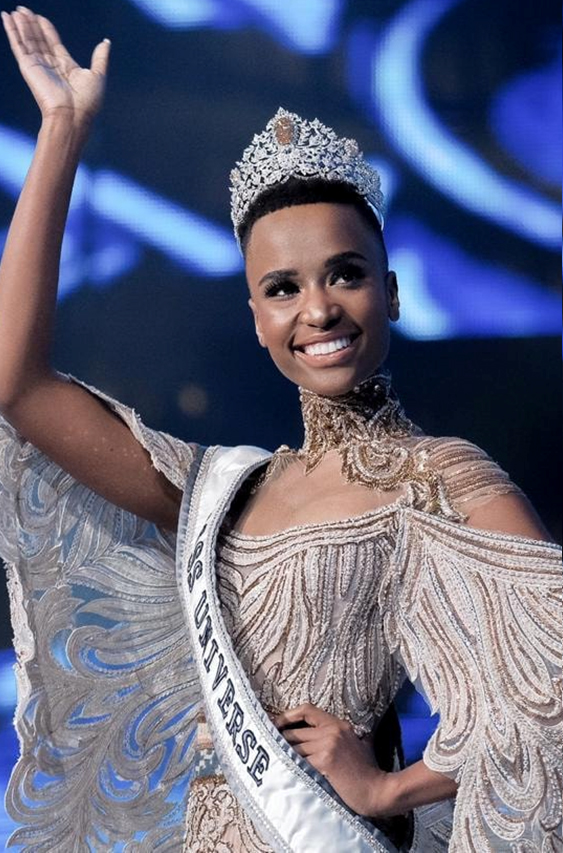
Kebaya designed by Anne Avantie was worn by Miss Universe 2019, Zozibini Tunzi while attending the Puteri Indonesia 2020 coronation.

Born in Semarang, 20 May 1964 and later spent her childhood in the city of Surakarta, Central Java. She is the eldest of three children of Hary Alexander and Amie Indarti. Anne Avantie is married to Yoseph Henry Susilo (her 2nd husband) and is the mother of 3 children. First, Intan Avantie is married to Christinus and has one child, Matthew Archiello Keenant Wijasena. Anne's second and third children are all male, namely Ernest Christoga Susilo and Ian Tadio Christoga Susilo.

Since childhood, Anne Avantie has shown an interest in the world of fashion. In 1989, Anne started her career as a fashion designer from a rented house with 2 sewing machines as capital. The first place of business was named "Griya Busana Permatasari". Until 2010, Anne had two boutiques at Mall Kelapa Gading and "Roémah Pengantén", in Grand Indonesia. In addition, Anne also has a shop called "Pendopo" which sells domestic art products made by small and medium enterprises (SMEs).

Anne Avantie also runs several non-profit communities for the ills and down syndrome kids.

On 2021, Mattel appoints Anne Avantie to be the 2nd Barbie role model from Indonesia, after Nyimas Bunga Cinta in 2020. The one-of-a-kind of her doll was made in the U.S.
