= Soedarsono Hadisapoetro =

Indonesian politician

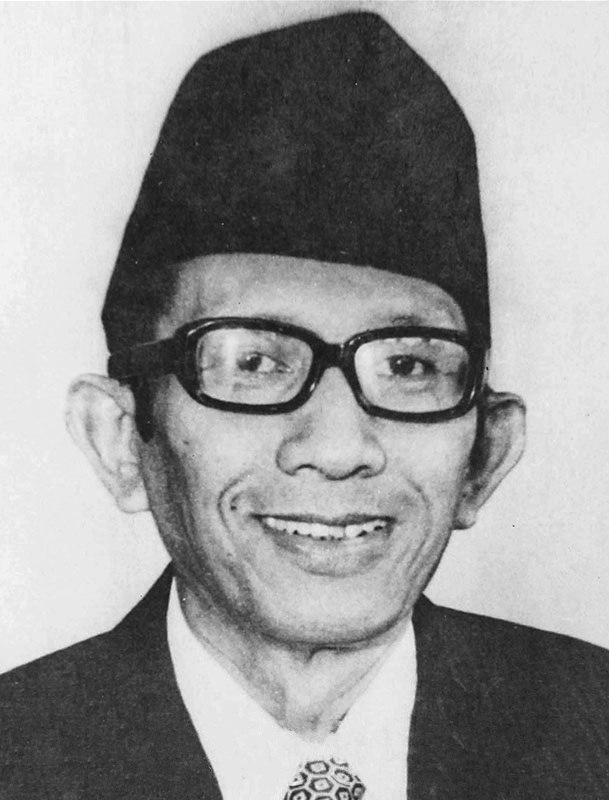

17th [[Ministry of Agriculture]]
- In office 29 March 1978 – 19 March 1983
- President: Suharto
- Preceded by: Toyib Hadiwijaya
- Succeeded by: Achmad Affandi

Personal details
- Born: July 15, 1921 Surakarta, Central Java, Dutch East Indies
- Died: June 10, 1988 (aged 66) Jakarta, Indonesia
- Spouse: Sendang Lestari
- Education: Gadjah Mada University

Soedarsono Hadisapoetro (1921–1989) served as Agriculture Minister in the Suharto government of Indonesia from 1978 to 1983.

Soedarsono was born in 1921 in Surakarta, Central Java. He was appointed Agriculture Minister by President Suharto in 1978 and served until 1983. He founded Koperasi Unit Desa and Badan Usaha Unit Desa in the early 1980s, which, although small, was influential in the early New Order era, because of the expertise and high education levels of its leaders. He also a teacher at Gadjah Mada University, Yogyakarta. He died in Jakarta of cancer in 1989.

He also one of the founders of BIMAS and INMAS which teach farmers (BIMAS) and Mass Intensification (INMAS) so that the result is productive. As the result of his work, Indonesia received the Star of FAO in food self-sufficiency in 1984 in Rome.
