= Miss Indonesia 2020 =

16th Miss Indonesia competition, beauty pageant edition

- Date: February 20, 2020
- Presenters: Robby Purba, Daniel Mananta, Amanda Zevannya
- Entertainment: Andmesh Kamaleng, Marion Jola, Indonesian Idol X Grandfinalists: Lyodra Ginting & Tiara Anugerah
- Venue: MNC Studio, Kebon Jeruk, Jakarta
- Broadcaster: RCTI
- Entrants: 34
- Placements: 15
- Winner: Pricilia Carla Yules; South Sulawesi

Miss Indonesia 2020, the 16th edition of the Miss Indonesia pageant, was held on February 20, 2020 at MNC Studio, Kebon Jeruk, Jakarta. Princess Megonondo of Jambi crowned her successor, Pricilia Carla Yules of South Sulawesi at the end of the event. She represented Indonesia at Miss World 2021 where she placed in the Top 6. Miss World 2019, Toni-Ann Singh of Jamaica attended the awarding night.

== Judges ==
- Liliana Tanoesoedibjo, founder and chairman of Miss Indonesia Organization.
- Peter F. Saerang, professional make-up and hairstylist.
- Ferry Salim, actor, entrepreneur, and ambassador of UNICEF to Indonesia.
- Harry Darsono, Fashion Designer.
- Maria Harfanti, Miss Indonesia 2015, 2nd-Runner-up Miss World 2015, Miss World Asia 2015.
- Natasha Mannuela Halim, Miss Indonesia 2016, 2nd-Runner-up Miss World 2016, Miss World Asia 2016.

== Result ==
=== Placements ===
Placement	Contestant
Miss Indonesia 2020	South Sulawesi - Pricilia Carla Yules
1st Runner-up	Bangka Belitung Islands - Christella Fenisianti
2nd Runner-up	East Nusa Tenggara - Nadia Riwu Kaho
3rd Runner-up	Jambi - Larissa Amelinda Soerayana
4th Runner-up	North Sulawesi - Salma Effendi
Top 16	Aceh - Arifia Maulida; Central Java - Alivia Bunga Kurniawan; Central Kalimantan - Lusia Silvana Hermawan; Central Sulawesi - Nathalia Hosiana; Lampung - Ning Ayu Suwenda; North Maluku - Prilly Tamara; North Sulawesi - Gabriella Valencia; South Sumatra - Caesaria Ayu Ramadhani; West Java - Ericka Verena; West Nusa Tenggara - Audrey Formoza; West Sulawesi - Jennifer Janice Setyawan Halim

=== Fast Track Event ===
Fast track events held during preliminary round and the winners of Fast Track events are automatically qualified to enter the semifinal round. This year's fast track events include : Talent, Catwalk (Modeling), Sports, Nature and Beauty Fashion, Social Media, And Beauty with a Purpose.

Category	Contestant
Beauty with a Purpose	East Nusa Tenggara - Nadia Riwu Kaho
Model	South Sulawesi - Pricilia Carla Yules
Talent	Central Sulawesi - Nathalia Hosiana
Sports	North Maluku - Prilly Tamara
Social Media (Multimedia)	Aceh - Arifia Maulida
Nature and Beauty Fashion	South Sumatra - Caesaria Ayu Ramadhani

=== Special awards ===
Special Awards include 3 Category :

Award	Contestant
Miss Congeniality	West Nusa Tenggara - Audrey Formoza
Miss Favorite	Aceh - Arifia Maulida

==== Order Announcements ====
===== Top 16 =====
1. Maluku Utara§
2. South Sumatera §
3. Aceh §
4. South Sulawesi §
5. East Nusa Tengga §
6. Central Sulawesi §
7. Central Java
8. Central Kalimantan
9. North Sumatera
10. North Sulawesi
11. West Nusa Tenggara
12. Jambi
13. West Kalimantan
14. Bangka Belitung Islands
15. West Java
16. Lampung

§ Placed into the Top 16 by Fast Track

===== Top 5 =====
1. North Sumatera
2. Jambi
3. East Nusa Tenggara
4. South Sulawesi
5. Bangka Belitung Islands

== Contestants ==
Contestants of Miss Indonesia 2020 from 34 provinces in Indonesia.

Province	Delegate	Age	Height	Hometown
Aceh	Arifia Maulida	20	1.70 m (5 ft 7 in)	Banda Aceh
North Sumatra	Salma Effendi	21	1.73 m (5 ft 8 in)	Medan
West Sumatra	Kirana Salsabilla	21	1.68 m (5 ft 6 in)	Padang
Riau	Malida Dinda Utami	18	1.70 m (5 ft 7 in)	Pekanbaru
Riau Islands	Ester Liana	23	1.70 m (5 ft 7 in)	Batam
Jambi	Larissa Amelinda Soerayana	20	1.71 m (5 ft 7 in)	Jambi
South Sumatra	Caesaria Ayu Ramadhani	22	1.70 m (5 ft 7 in)	Palembang
Bangka Belitung Islands	Christella Fenisianti	22	1.72 m (5 ft 8 in)	Pangkal Pinang
Bengkulu	Indrawati Kusumadewi	19	1.70 m (5 ft 7 in)	Bengkulu
Lampung	Ning Ayu Suwenda	18	1.70 m (5 ft 7 in)	Kalianda
Jakarta Special Capital Region	Sherina Wijaya	19	1.68 m (5 ft 6 in)	Jakarta
Banten	Putri Lisa	22	1.68 m (5 ft 6 in)	Tangerang
West Java	Ericka Verena	18	1.71 m (5 ft 7 in)	Bandung
Central Java	Alivia Bunga Kurniawan	20	1.75 m (5 ft 9 in)	Kudus
Yogyakarta Special Region	Michelle Naomi	20	1.68 m (5 ft 6 in)	Yogyakarta
East Java	Cindy Arta Purbasari	22	1.72 m (5 ft 8 in)	Surabaya
Bali	Natasya Oktavia Mangadang	18	1.73 m (5 ft 8 in)	Denpasar
West Nusa Tenggara	Audrey Formoza	20	1.77 m (5 ft 10 in)	Mataram
East Nusa Tenggara	Nadia Riwu Kaho	19	1.70 m (5 ft 7 in)	Kupang
West Kalimantan	Jennifer Janice Setyawan Halim	22	1.71 m (5 ft 7 in)	Pontianak
South Kalimantan	Sarah Qonita Yogaswara	23	1.70 m (5 ft 7 in)	Banjarmasin
Central Kalimantan	Lusia Silvana Hermawan	23	1.70 m (5 ft 7 in)	Palangka Raya
East Kalimantan	Audrey Sugito	19	1.73 m (5 ft 8 in)	Balikpapan
North Kalimantan	Carlin Patricia	18	1.67 m (5 ft 6 in)	Tarakan
South Sulawesi	Pricilia Carla Yules	23	1.75 m (5 ft 9 in)	Makassar
West Sulawesi	Decelya Widya Pratiwi	20	1.75 m (5 ft 9 in)	Majene
Southeast Sulawesi	Annisa Pretty Musa	19	1.70 m (5 ft 7 in)	Kendari
Central Sulawesi	Nathalia Hosiana	22	1.70 m (5 ft 7 in)	Palu
North Sulawesi	Gabriella Valencia	20	1.70 m (5 ft 7 in)	Manado
Gorontalo	Sarah Gabriella Tumiwa	19	1.75 m (5 ft 9 in)	Gorontao
Maluku	Sharon Sahetapy	19	1.70 m (5 ft 7 in)	Ambon
North Maluku	Prilly Tamara	23	1.70 m (5 ft 7 in)	Ternate
West Papua	Fransisca Bianca Tesalonica	22	1.71 m (5 ft 7 in)	Sorong
Papua	Sinthike Andriannitha Mabruaru	21	1.68 m (5 ft 6 in)	Jayapura
