= Miss Indonesia 2017 =

- Date: April 22, 2017
- Presenters: Robby Purba, Amanda Zevannya, Indra Herlambang, Sere Kalina
- Entertainment: Judika, Bunga Citra Lestari, Armand Maulana, Angga Puradiredja, Lea Simanjuntak, Dipha Barus
- Venue: MNC Studio, Kebon Jeruk, Jakarta, Indonesia
- Broadcaster: RCTI
- Entrants: 34
- Placements: 15
- Winner: Achintya Holte Nielsen; West Nusa Tenggara
- Congeniality: Maria Andromeda Meok; East Nusa Tenggara

Miss Indonesia 2017 is the 13th edition of the Miss Indonesia pageant. It was held on April 22, 2017, at MNC Studio, Kebon Jeruk, Jakarta, Indonesia. Miss World 2016, Stephanie Del Valle of Puerto Rico attended the awarding night.

Natasha Mannuela as Miss Indonesia 2016 from Bangka-Belitung Islands crowned her successor, Achintya Holte Nielsen from West Nusa Tenggara. She represented Indonesia in Miss World 2017.

== Judges ==
- Liliana Tanoesoedibjo, founder and chairwoman of Miss Indonesia Organization.
- Peter F. Saerang, professional make-up and hairstylist.
- Noor Sabah Nael Traavik, wife of the ambassador of Norway to Indonesia.
- Wulan Tilaar Widarto, vice-chairwoman of Martha Tilaar Group.
- Ferry Salim, actor, entrepreneur, and ambassador of UNICEF to Indonesia.
- Maria Harfanti, Miss Indonesia 2015 from Yogyakarta Special Region

== Result ==
=== Placements ===
Result	Contestant
Miss Indonesia 2017	West Nusa Tenggara - Achintya Holte Nielsen
1st Runner-up	Bengkulu - Astrini Putri
2nd Runner-up	North Sulawesi - Ivhanrel Eltrisna Sumerah
3rd Runner-up	Central Java - Dinda Ayu Saraswati
4th Runner-up	Yogyakarta Special Region - Anja Litani Ariella
Top 15 semifinalist	Aceh - Sekar Audifa; Banten - Givina Lukitadewi; Jakarta Special Capital Region - Rebecca Olivia Haryuni; Jambi - Nadya Patricia Yobelina; Central Kalimantan - Anggun Chyntia Harani; West Kalimantan - Lisa Marie Djunggara; North Kalimantan - Elisabeth Suryani; Maluku - Stella Natalia Mulia Lumalessil; North Maluku - Abigail Bianca Mckenzie; South Sumatra - Genesia Synclaire Tjoa

==== Order Announcements ====
===== Top 15 =====
1. North Maluku §
2. Bengkulu §
3. North Kalimantan §
4. Central Kalimantan §
5. Jakarta SCR §
6. West Nusa Tenggara §
7. Maluku
8. Yogyakarta Special Region
9. South Sumatera
10. Banten
11. North Sulawesi
12. West Kalimantan
13. Jambi
14. Central Java
15. Aceh

§ Placed into the Top 15 by Fast Track

===== Top 5 =====
1. West Nusa Tenggara
2. Yogyakarta Special Region
3. Bengkulu
4. North Sulawesi
5. Central Java

=== Fast Track Event ===
Fast track events held during preliminary round and the winners of Fast Track events are automatically qualified to enter the semifinal round. This year's fast track events include : Talent, Catwalk (Modeling), Sports, Nature and Beauty Fashion, Social Media, And Beauty with a Purpose.

Category	Contestant
Talent	Jakarta Special Capital Region - Rebecca Olivia Haryuni
Catwalk (Top Model)	Bengkulu - Astrini Putri
Sports	Central Kalimantan - Anggun Chyntia Harani
Nature and Beauty Fashion	North Maluku - Abigail Bianca Mckenzie
Social Media	North Kalimantan - Elisabeth Suryani
Beauty with a Purpose	West Nusa Tenggara - Achintya Holte Nielsen

=== Special Awards ===
Award	Contestant
Miss Congeniality	East Nusa Tenggara - Maria Andromeda Meok
Miss Favorite	North Sumatra - Friska Olivia Panggabean

== Contestants ==
Contestants of Miss Indonesia 2017 from 34 Provinces in Indonesia.

Province	Delegate	Age	Height	Hometown
Aceh	Sekar Audifa	22	1.70 m (5 ft 7 in)	Banda Aceh
North Sumatra	Friska Olivia Panggabean	18	1.74 m (5 ft 9 in)	Medan
West Sumatra	Immaculata Nella Ratio	23	1.73 m (5 ft 8 in)	Padang
Riau	Ade Auliya Rahma	22	1.70 m (5 ft 7 in)	Pekanbaru
Riau Islands	Muthia Kirana Adhelina	23	1.73 m (5 ft 8 in)	Bandung
Jambi	Nadya Patricia Yobelina	21	1.70 m (5 ft 7 in)	Jambi
South Sumatra	Genesia Synclaire Tjoa	18	1.73 m (5 ft 8 in)	Palembang
Bangka Belitung	Mellisa Hendrawati Briliantika	23	1.70 m (5 ft 7 in)	Bangka
Bengkulu	Astrini Putri	23	1.72 m (5 ft 8 in)	Bengkulu
Lampung	Haifa Ghaida Safar	21	1.68 m (5 ft 6 in)	Bandar Lampung
Jakarta Special Capital Region	Rebecca Olivia Haryuni	19	1.70 m (5 ft 7 in)	Jakarta
Banten	Givina Lukitadewi	19	1.68 m (5 ft 6 in)	Tangerang
West Java	Grace Kencana Pranata	21	1.68 m (5 ft 6 in)	Bandung
Central Java	Dinda Ayu Saraswati	19	1.73 m (5 ft 8 in)	Semarang
Yogyakarta Special Region	Anja Litani Ariella	21	1.73 m (5 ft 8 in)	Yogyakarta
East Java	Vivian Tania	18	1.72 m (5 ft 8 in)	Surabaya
Bali	I Gusti Agung Ayu Berlian Audya Parimayuna	21	1.73 m (5 ft 8 in)	Denpasar
West Nusa Tenggara	Achintya Holte Nilsen	18	1.78 m (5 ft 10 in)	Lombok
East Nusa Tenggara	Maria Andromeda Meok	23	1.74 m (5 ft 9 in)	Rote
West Kalimantan	Lisa Marie Djunggara	22	1.73 m (5 ft 8 in)	Pontianak
South Kalimantan	Dameria Ester Siburian	21	1.70 m (5 ft 7 in)	Banjarmasin
East Kalimantan	Maria Mersha Dona Cirilo Madellu	19	1.75 m (5 ft 9 in)	Balikpapan
North Kalimantan	Elisabeth Suryani	20	1.68 m (5 ft 6 in)	Medan
South Sulawesi	Ayu Jelita Ningrum	23	1.72 m (5 ft 8 in)	Makassar
West Sulawesi	Nurwinda Anggraeny	20	1.68 m (5 ft 6 in)	Polewali Mandar
Southeast Sulawesi	Ayu Pritalia Winarti	22	1.73 m (5 ft 8 in)	Jakarta
Central Sulawesi	Adhetya Ghazitha Kasim	20	1.70 m (5 ft 7 in)	Palu
North Sulawesi	Ivhanrel Eltrisna Sumerah	23	1.71 m (5 ft 7 in)	Manado
Gorontalo	Novi Andriati Salim	20	1.70 m (5 ft 7 in)	Jakarta
Maluku	Stella Natalia Mulia Lumalessil	23	1.73 m (5 ft 8 in)	Central Maluku
North Maluku	Abigail Bianca Mckenzie	19	1.70 m (5 ft 7 in)	Jakarta
West Papua	Aprida Regita Sigalingging	20	1.74 m (5 ft 9 in)	Jakarta
Papua	Sara Gabriella Papare Sianipar	22	1.68 m (5 ft 6 in)	Biak
