= Miss Indonesia 2018 =

- Date: 22 February 2018
- Presenters: Robby Purba, Amanda Zevannya, Daniel Mananta
- Entertainment: Jaz, HIVI!, Virgoun Tambunan, Gloria Jessica
- Venue: MNC Studio, Kebon Jeruk, Jakarta, Indonesia
- Broadcaster: RCTI
- Entrants: 34
- Placements: 16
- Winner: Alya Nurshabrina; West Java
- Congeniality: Ludia Amaye Maryen; Papua

Miss Indonesia 2018 is the 14th edition of the Miss Indonesia pageant. It was held on 22 February 2018, at MNC Studio, Kebon Jeruk, Jakarta, Indonesia. Miss World 2017, Manushi Chhillar of India, attended the awarding night.

Achintya Holte Nielsen as Miss Indonesia 2017 from West Nusa Tenggara crowned her successor, Alya Nurshabrina from West Java. She represented Indonesia in Miss World 2018.

== Judges ==
- Liliana Tanoesoedibjo, founder and chairwoman of Miss Indonesia Organization.
- Peter F. Saerang, professional make-up and hairstylist.
- Wulan Tilaar Widarto, vice-chairwoman of Martha Tilaar Group.
- Ferry Salim, actor, entrepreneur, and ambassador of UNICEF to Indonesia.
- Natasha Mannuela, Miss Indonesia 2016, Runner-up 2 Miss World 2016, Miss World Asia 2016.

== Result ==
=== Placements ===
Result	Contestant
Miss Indonesia 2018	West Java - Alya Nurshabrina
1st Runner-up	West Sumatra - Narda Virelia
2nd Runner-up	Central Java - Nadya Astrella Juliana
3rd Runner-up	North Sulawesi - Harini Merly Betrix Sondakh
4th Runner-up	Aceh - Raudha Kasmir
Top 15 semifinalist	Banten - Haifa Nafisa; Central Kalimantan - Mercy Andrea; East Java - Angeline Stephani; Jakarta Special Capital Region - Beatrice Elizabeth Elena; Jambi - Natasya Dey; North Kalimantan - Cloudia Shinta Bestari; North Sumatra - Lydia Cherissa D'Cruz Sitorus; Riau - Mitha Ardianti Safira; South Kalimantan - Fiyona Alidjurnawan; West Nusa Tenggara - Natasha Keniraras; Yogyakarta Special Region - Giovanna Yudi

==== Top 16 ====
1. Banten §
2. Riau §
3. Jambi §
4. Aceh §
5. Central Java §
6. West Java §
7. North Sumatra
8. South Kalimantan
9. Yogya Special Region
10. West Sumatra
11. Central Kalimantan
12. Jakarta SCR
13. North Kalimantan
14. East Java
15. North Sulawesi
16. West Nusa Tenggara

§ Placed into the Top 16 by Fast Track

==== Top 5 ====
1. North Sulawesi
2. Aceh
3. Central Java
4. West Java
5. West Sumatra

=== Fast Track Event ===
Fast track events held during preliminary round and the winners of Fast Track events are automatically qualified to enter the semifinal round. This year's fast track events include : Talent, Catwalk (Modeling), Sports, Nature and Beauty Fashion, Social Media, And Beauty with a Purpose.

Category	Contestant
Talent	Central Java - Nadya Astrella Juliana
Catwalk (Top Model)	Aceh - Raudha Kasmir
Sports	Riau - Mitha Ardianti Safira
Nature and Beauty Fashion	Banten - Haifa Nafisa
Social Media	Jambi - Natasya Dey
Beauty with a Purpose	West Java - Alya Nurshabrina

=== Special Awards ===
Award	Contestant
Miss Congeniality	Papua - Ludia Amaye Maryen
Miss Favorite	South Kalimantan - Fiyona Alidjurnawan
Miss Natural Beauty	West Sumatra - Narda Virelia
Miss Selfie in Detail	Aceh - Raudha Kasmir
Miss Healthy Beauty Skin	Central Java - Nadya Astrella Juliana

== Contestants ==
Contestants of Miss Indonesia 2018 from 34 Provinces in Indonesia.

Province	Delegate	Age	Height	Hometown
Aceh	Raudha Kasmir	20	1.70 m (5 ft 7 in)	Banda Aceh
North Sumatra	Lydia Cherissa D'Cruz Sitorus	22	1.76 m (5 ft 9 in)	Medan
West Sumatra	Narda Virelia	22	1.67 m (5 ft 6 in)	Padang
Riau	Mitha Ardianti Safira	20	1.69 m (5 ft 7 in)	Pekanbaru
Riau Islands	Anastasha Carolyna Lya Handoyo	19	1.68 m (5 ft 6 in)	Batam
Jambi	Natasya Dey	18	1.73 m (5 ft 8 in)	Jambi City
South Sumatra	Claudia Jessica	23	1.73 m (5 ft 8 in)	Palembang
Bangka Belitung	Sabrina Daniel	21	1.70 m (5 ft 7 in)	Tangerang
Bengkulu	Meidinta Rinda Tania	22	1.70 m (5 ft 7 in)	Bengkulu City
Lampung	Jesica Kumala Atmadja	19	1.70 m (5 ft 7 in)	Bandar Lampung
Jakarta Special Capital Region	Beatrice Elizabeth Elena	18	1.70 m (5 ft 7 in)	Jakarta
Banten	Haifa Nafisa	23	1.67 m (5 ft 6 in)	Tangerang
West Java	Alya Nurshabrina	21	1.74 m (5 ft 9 in)	Bandung
Central Java	Nadya Astrella Juliana	21	1.71 m (5 ft 7 in)	Surakarta
Yogyakarta Special Region	Giovanna Yudi	21	1.70 m (5 ft 7 in)	Yogyakarta
East Java	Angeline Stephanie	23	1.70 m (5 ft 7 in)	Surabaya
Bali	Made Indah Swastiandewi	20	1.71 m (5 ft 7 in)	Denpasar
West Nusa Tenggara	Natasha Keniraras	20	1.72 m (5 ft 8 in)	Mataram
East Nusa Tenggara	Mayestika Dhea Dara	21	1.68 m (5 ft 6 in)	West Sumba
West Kalimantan	Lisa Marie Djunggara	22	1.72 m (5 ft 8 in)	Pontianak
South Kalimantan	Fiyona Alidjurnawan	23	1.68 m (5 ft 6 in)	Jakarta
Central Kalimantan	Mercy Andrea	21	1.69 m (5 ft 7 in)	Palangkaraya
East Kalimantan	Monica Jasmine	20	1.70 m (5 ft 7 in)	Balikpapan
North Kalimantan	Cloudia Shinta Bestari	20	1.70 m (5 ft 7 in)	Tarakan
South Sulawesi	Fadilah Septari Zandrah	21	1.70 m (5 ft 7 in)	Palopo
West Sulawesi	Alicia Maria Solangia Djilin	18	1.71 m (5 ft 7 in)	Mamuju
Southeast Sulawesi	Lita Hendratno	22	1.68 m (5 ft 6 in)	Kendari
Central Sulawesi	Aldella Prakawardhani Handoyo	23	1.65 m (5 ft 5 in)	Palu
North Sulawesi	Harini Merly Betrix Sondakh	22	1.70 m (5 ft 7 in)	Manado
Gorontalo	Dinda Husnaa Dhiyaulhaq	18	1.70 m (5 ft 7 in)	Semarang
Maluku	Alexandra Del Viera Leiwakabessy	19	1.76 m (5 ft 9 in)	Ambon
North Maluku	Kathy Monica Kabe	23	1.70 m (5 ft 7 in)	Ternate
West Papua	Ramzaniarta Thriyuliantiarchma	18	1.72 m (5 ft 8 in)	Manokwari
Papua	Ludia Amaye Maryen	21	1.67 m (5 ft 6 in)	Jayapura

== Crossovers ==
Contestants who previously competed in other local beauty pageants or in international beauty pageants and reality modeling competition :

Puteri Indonesia

- 2022: Bangka Belitung - Sabrina Daniel (TBA)

Miss Earth Indonesia

- 2017: Central Kalimantan - Mercy Andrea (Top 10 & Miss Animal Welfare)

Miss Global Indonesia

- 2017: Riau Islands - Anastasha Carolyna Lya Handoyo
- 2017: Papua - Ludia Amaye Maryen (Miss Congeniality)

Puteri Citra Indonesia

- 2010: Southeast Sulawesi - Lita Hendratno (Runner-up 2)

Puteri Selam Indonesia

- 2017: Southeast Sulawesi - Lita Hendratno

Wajah Femina

- 2014: West Java - Alya Nurshabrina (Winner)
