= Pricilia Carla Yules =

Indonesian beauty pageant titleholder (born 1996)

Carla Yules
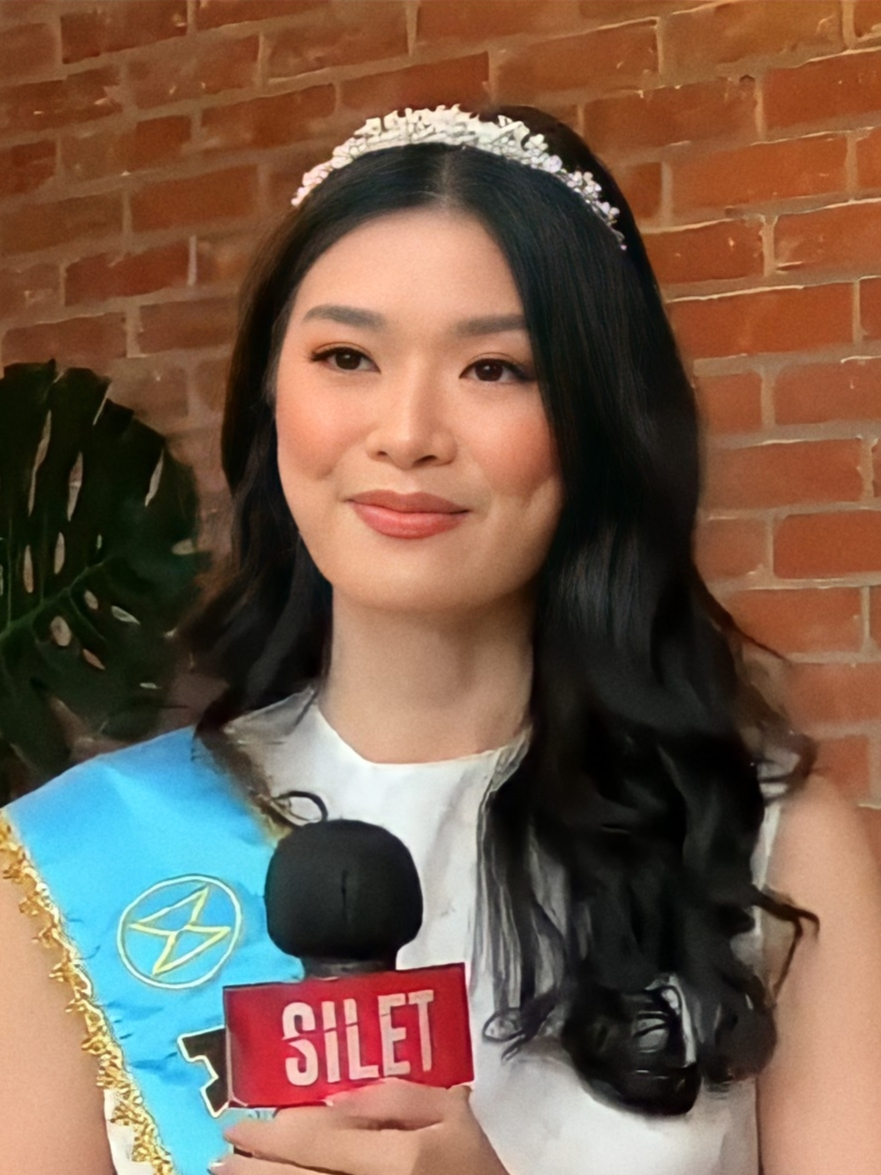
- Yules in 2021
- Born: Pricilia Carla Saputri Yules; 8 July 1996 (age 30); Surabaya, East Java, Indonesia
- Alma mater: William Angliss Institute of TAFE
- Beauty pageant titleholder
- Title: Miss Indonesia 2020
- Eye color: Dark Brown / Black
- Major competitions: Miss Indonesia 2020; (Winner); (Top Model); Miss World 2021; (Top 6); (Miss World Asia & Oceania)

Pricilia Carla Saputri Yules (born 8 July 1996), better known as Carla Yules, is an Indonesian beauty pageant titleholder who won the title of Miss Indonesia 2020 representing South Sulawesi.

Yules represented Indonesia at Miss World 2021, where and reached the top six, and also won the Miss World Asia & Oceania title. Yules is the fourth Indonesian to win the title and the tenth Indonesian to place as finalist in Miss World history.

== Early life and education ==
Yules was born on 8 July 1996 in Surabaya, East Java, Indonesia to Chinese Indonesian parents, Joe Fredy Yules and Yunny Chandra from Makassar, South Sulawesi. After graduating from high school, Yules took a gap year before moving to Melbourne, Australia in 2015 to pursue her culinary study.

Yules finished junior high school at St. Agnes Catholic Junior High School and continued her study at Frateran Catholic Senior High School in Surabaya, East Java, Indonesia. She received her diploma in Hospitality Management & Cookery from William Angliss Institute of TAFE in Melbourne, Australia

During her time in Melbourne, Australia, Yules worked as a cook at well-known restaurants, and as volunteer cook for homeless shelters. On returning to Indonesia, she resumed her social work with MNC Peduli.

== Pageantry ==
=== Miss Indonesia 2020 ===
Yules entered her first pageant in 2020, aged 23. She represented South Sulawesi and won Miss Indonesia 2020 in Jakarta, competing against 33 other contestants.

During the final question and answer round, the top five contestants were each given different topics to speak on, which they picked through a draw. The question was asked by Liliana Tanaja Tanoesoedibjo, president and chief executive officer of MNC Group and Miss Indonesia Organization; "Knowledge will give you power, but character gives you respect, can you elaborate this sentence?," asked Liliana. Yules answered:

If you have a knowledge you can do many things in life. Knowledge makes you powerful, but having a good heart is foundation to get you a life, and therefore and if you have a good heart, it’s the most powerful human being that you can achieved.

The grand finale was held at MNC Studio, Jakarta, Indonesia, on 20 February 2020. Yules was crowned by the outgoing titleholder of Miss Indonesia 2019 and the Miss World 2019 top 40 finalist, Princess Megonondo of Jambi. Miss World 2016, Toni-Ann Singh of Jamaica attended the awarding night.

=== Miss World 2021 ===
As Miss Indonesia 2020, Yules represented Indonesia at Miss World 2021, held in the Coca-Cola Music Hall, San Juan, Puerto Rico, on 16 March 2022. During the pageant pre-quarantine, Yules won several awards, winning the Head To Head Challenge (Group 2) and advancing to the Top 27 semifinal round of The Miss World Talent fast track by showcasing Pakarena Dance and traditional Buginese cloths, Bodo blouse and Sarong.

On 14 December, the Miss World Indonesia] organization announced that Yules and others tested positive for COVID-19, and the event was rescheduled.

The finale took place on 16 March 2022, with the 40 semifinalists at Puerto Rico's Coca-Cola Music Hall,

Yules finished as a top six finalist, with her Can we ever overcome inequality? answer;

Can we ever overcome inequality? “Yes absolutely. I do think we can overcome inequality by respecting each other between women and men, and I do think that equality will submerge if we keep each other and keep respecting each other, our presence, and the way we think. That’s why I think we can overcome if we are joined together, we can overcome it.

Yules also won Miss World Asia & Oceania. This is the tenth consecutive year (a decade) Indonesia placed in the semifinalist, also the third time Indonesia placed in the Top 6 of Miss World history and the third highest placement Indonesia has ever achieved since Maria Harfanti and Natasha Mannuela Halim both placed as the second runner-up consecutively in 2015 and 2016. Yules is the fourth Indonesians to win the "Miss World Asia & Oceania" title. Toni-Ann Singh of Jamaica crowned her successor Karolina Bielawska of Poland as the new titleholder at the end of the event.

== Filmography ==
Yules has appeared in several music videos as a model and co-singer. She has acted in television and talk shows.

=== Television ===
Year	Title	Genre	Role	Film Production	Ref.
2020	MasterChef Indonesia - Season 6	Cookery	as herself	RCTI	
2020	OK Chef Season 1	Cookery	as herself	RCTI	
2021	Tonight Show	Talkshow	as herself	NET TV	

=== Music video ===
Year	Title	Role	Singer/Artist	Ref.
2020	Senyumlah	as model	Andmesh Kamaleng	
2023	Salah Hati	as model	2nd Chance	

== Awards and nominations ==
Year	Awards	Category	Nominated work	Result	Ref.
2020	HighEnd by HighEnd Magazine	HighEnd 2020/2021	Herself	Won	
2021	HighEnd The Alpha Under 40 by HighEnd Magazine	HighEnd The Alpha Under 40 of 2021	Herself	Won	

== See also ==
- Miss World 2022

Awards and achievements
Preceded by Princess Megonondo	Miss Indonesia; 2020	Succeeded by Audrey Vanessa Susilo
Preceded by India Suman Ratan Singh Rao	Miss World Asia & Oceania; 2022	Succeeded by Lebanon Yasmina Zaytoun
Preceded by Brazil Elis Miele; Nigeria Nyekachi Douglas (Top 5)	Miss World Top 6 Finalist; 2021 (with Mexico Karolina Vidales (Northern Ireland) Anna Leitch)	Succeeded by Botswana Lesogo Chombo; Trinidad and Tobago Aché Abrahams (Top 4)
