= Ivhanrel Sumerah =

Indonesian journalist

- Born: Ivhanrel Eltrisna Sumerah; 6 September 1994 (age 32); Manado, Indonesia
- Height: 1.72 m (5 ft 7 1/2 in)
- Beauty pageant titleholder
- Title: Miss Sulawesi Utara 2017; Miss Earth Indonesia Ecotourism 2014
- Hair color: Brown
- Eye color: Brown
- Major competitions: Miss Earth Indonesia 2014 (4th Runner-up); World Miss University 2015/2016; Miss Sulawesi Utara 2017 (Winner); Miss Indonesia 2017 (2nd Runner-up)

Ivhanrel Eltrisna Sumerah (born 6 September 1994) is an Indonesian artist, journalist, and beauty pageant titleholder. She was crowned Miss Sulawesi Utara 2017 on January 1, 2017, in Manado, North Sulawesi. She is the second runner-up of Miss Indonesia 2017.

== Early life and education ==
Ivhanrel 'Vhanrel' Sumerah was born on 6 September 1994 in Manado, to Dr. Meidy Revly Sumerah, a national politician currently administering and developing NasDem Party, and Deity Kumendong of chinese origin, she’s a senior high official. She has a brother.

Vhanrel attended middle, and high school in her hometown in Manado, where she lived with her parents, before continue her studies in Jakarta and Seoul in South Korea In 2016, she graduated Doctor from Binus University with a degree in Communication Marketing.

She is passionate in vocal and music. In 2014 she won Jingle Competition for Etude House Korea. She is also an avid journalist, through 2014 she won multiple news anchor competition. She was news anchor for Berita Satu TV in 2014. In 2015 she was Indonesian representative for cultural exchange youth camp in Dong Daegu, South Korea. Vhanrel also had created foundations and got volunteered as a teacher for children in Papua

In 2017 Ivhanrel got nominated by Indonesian gouvernment to represent her country in UN United Nation conference program held in Bangkok Thailand

Her trip to Bangkok by private jet, will arouse controversy and disputes in the media and Society, she will apologize to the media on her return to Jakarta, justifying that "commercial flight schedules were not compatible with her appointments" and having traveled with her "personal money and not with the government envelope granted to Her". A radio host will declare "it is easier to get a private jet when your father is friend of the country's political leaders". Ivhanrel will file a complaint and will win his case with a public apology from the host.

In 2018 Ivhanrel Sumerah joined CNN Indonesia channel for a few months, but resigning due conflicting schedule with pageant duties. In 2021 she went on creating her own independent media, with diversity topics like philosophy, art, politics, the influence of the media on the society, travel and religion. she invites intellectuals, artists, politicians and religious leaders in lives broadcast on internet.

Ivhanrel Sumerah is also an ambassador for several clothing and cosmetics brands.

Her interview with the governor of DKI Jakarta, Anies Baswedan in 2018 during the tragic floods remains to this day one of the most viral interviews in Indonesia.

In 2023 Ivhanrel declared to the press that she is not interested in the 2024 presidential campaign, declaring that she did not support any of the 3 candidates in the running. She will say that "in a democracy the laws are voted by the deputies and the senators, it is therefore preferable to pay attention to the DPR and DPD candidates"

== Pageantry ==
=== Keke Minahasa Utara 2012 ===
She won her first beauty pageant in 2012 as Keke Minahasa Utara. A local beauty pageant on Minahasa Utara Regency of North Sulawesi.

=== Miss Earth Indonesia 2014 ===
She competed in Miss Earth Indonesia environmental-themed beauty pageant promoting environmental awareness where she was crowned Miss Earth - Eco Tourism Indonesia 2014, and also as Miss Earth Indonesia Favorite 2014. the crowning ceremony was broadcast live on June 19, 2014, by Kompas TV.

=== World Miss University 2016 ===
As Miss Earth Indonesia - Eco Tourism, she represented Indonesia in World Miss University 2016 held in Beijing. She won a special award as Miss Best Talent.

=== Miss Sulawesi Utara 2017 ===
On January 1, 2017, she was crowned Miss Sulawesi Utara, and set to represent North Sulawesi in Miss Indonesia 2017.

=== Miss Indonesia 2017 ===
Representing North Sulawesi, she was the second runner-up of Miss Indonesia 2017 after Achintya Holte Nielsen of West Nusa Tenggara and Astrini Putri of Bengkulu. The awarding night was held on April 22, 2017, in MNC Studio, Jakarta and broadcast live by RCTI. Miss World 2016, Stephanie Del Valle of Puerto Rico was present for the crowning ceremony

== Other ventures ==
She created LUC&IVHA an Organic bamboo fashion line, and currently she is a journalist for CNN Indonesia.

She was married in April 2019 to a French entrepreneur, the wedding ceremony welcomed more than 4,000 guests and was broadcast live on Indonesian television.

== Achievements ==
Year	Competition	Venue	Position	Notes
2011	Surabaya Art Competition	Surabaya, Indonesia	2 (silver medal)	
2012	Keke Minahasa Utara 2012	North Minahasa, North Sulawesi, Indonesia	1	
2014	BINUS TV Competition, News Anchor	Jakarta, Indonesia	1	
2013	SCTV Goes to Campus, News Anchor Competition	Jakarta, Indonesia	3	
2013	Jingle Competition Etude House Korea	Jakarta, Indonesia	1	
2014	Miss Earth Indonesia Ecotourism 2014	Jakarta, Indonesia	1	Also won Miss Earth Indonesia Favorite 2014
2016	World Miss University Indonesia	Beijing, China		Miss Best Talent special award
2017	Miss Sulawesi Utara 2017	North Sulawesi, Indonesia	1	
2017	Miss Indonesia 2017	Jakarta, Indonesia	2nd runner-up	
