= William Angliss Institute =

TAFE institute in Victoria, Australia

Coordinates: 37°48′46″S 144°57′13″E

- Type: TAFE / Higher Education Institute
- Established: 1940
- Students: 12,954 including local and international students
- Location: Melbourne, Victoria, Australia
- Campus: Melbourne, Sydney, China, Sri Lanka
- CEO: Grant Dreher
- Website: http://www.angliss.edu.au

William Angliss Institute is a vocational and higher education provider and Australia's largest specialist training centre for tourism, events, food and hospitality. It operates campuses in Melbourne CBD and Sydney, as well as through international partnerships in several countries.

== Courses ==
Angliss offers programs including VET, diplomas and higher education courses including bachelor's and master's degrees, VET in Schools, apprenticeships, accredited traineeships and short courses with delivery via campus-based, workplace-based, and blended learning models.

The institute provides training in the following specialist sectors:

Tourism

- Aviation (Cabin Crew)
- Tourism
- Travel

Events

- Event Management

Food

- Baking
- Commercial Cookery
- Patisserie
- Food Science and Technology
- Meat Processing
- Culinary Management

Hospitality

- Hospitality
- Hospitality Management
- Resort and Hotel Management
- International Hotel Leadership
- Tourism and Hospitality Management

== Campuses and locations ==
Melbourne

The main campus is located at 555 La Trobe Street, Melbourne CBD and close to numerous eateries, attractions, landmarks and global events. Facilities include training kitchens, hotel training suites, mock airplane cabin and food technology laboratories.

Students may participate in training activities at events such as the Melbourne Food and Wine Festival and the Melbourne Grand Prix.

Sydney

William Angliss Institute has been training in NSW since 2003, and opened its current campus located in Alexandria in 2018. It provides training in cookery, patisserie and hospitality, and features training restaurants and a purpose-built patisserie kitchen.

Cafe Imparo and Restaurant Rubric showcase the Institute's menu-based learning approach to training.

Other Australian Locations

The institute has offices in Brisbane, Adelaide, Perth and Darwin, extending its training reach across metropolitan and regional areas.

International

The Institute delivers education internationally. Programs are delivered through third party arrangements with partners in China and Sri Lanka. International projects and programs are developed in collaboration with industry, government entities and development aid agencies.

The institute operates in the following countries:

China

- Nanjing Institute of Tourism and Hospitality
- Tourism College of Zhejiang
- Zhongshan Polytechnic College

Sri Lanka

- Colombo Academy of Hospitality Management

Vietnam

- Dong A University Australia

== History ==
The institute was established as the William Angliss Food Trades School following a donation by businessman Sir William Charles Angliss (£20,000) in 1939. Classes began on 18 September 1940 with the majority of the initial enrolments coming from the Royal Australian Air Force (RAAF). Approximately 193 students were enrolled, with 68 in Butchery, 51 in Bread Baking, 31 in Pastry Cooking and 43 in Cooking.

In 1960, responding to requests from local industry leaders, the school expanded its curriculum to include programs in hospitality, administration, catering, and food and beverage services. Tourism programs were introduced in 1970, prompting a rebranding to William Angliss College, and later to William Angliss Institute.

As interest in culinary careers increased in the 1980s, the foods department grew rapidly. In 1990, the Institute's team won five gold medals at the IKA Culinary Olympics held in Frankfurt, Germany. In 2006, Chef, Paul Bocuse delivered lectures to cookery students.

In 2007, 39 students enrolled in the inaugural Degree programs of the Bachelor or Culinary Management and Bachelor of Tourism and Hospitality Management. The new Link Building was launched in 2010, providing new classrooms and a modern Learning Resource Centre for students. The Angliss International Hotel School was established in 2017 and postgraduate studies commenced in 2019.

In 2024, the Great Chefs program celebrated 30 years as the most successful program of its kind in Australia bringing more than 100 industry-leading chef and restaurants into the Angliss Restaurant. William Angliss Institute published a commemorative Great Chefs Cookbook including recipes by 15 of Australia's respected chefs, who have contributed to the ongoing success of the Angliss Great Chefs program.

In 2025, the Institute celebrated its 85th anniversary.

== Notable alumni ==
- Pricilia Carla Yules - Indonesian professional chef, TV personality, model and beauty pageant titleholder who won the title of Miss Indonesia 2020, and Miss World Asia 2021
- Gillian Chung Ka-Lai - Hong Kong singer and actress
- Michelle Anne Garnaut - Australian restaurateur and cook best known for her TV cooking show series

== See also ==
- National Indigenous Training Academy
