= National Indigenous Training Academy =

Vocational academy training Indigenous Australians in tourism and hospitality

Coordinates: 25°14′16″S 130°59′09″E

National Indigenous Training Academy, is located in Yulara, Northern Territory, Australia. It was established in 2011, by the Indigenous Land Corporation to provide training programs for Indigenous Australians within the country's tourism and hospitality industry. William Angliss Institute of TAFE provided nationally-accredited training to students enrolled at the National Indigenous Training Academy.
