= Pangkal Balam =

Port of Pangkal Balam
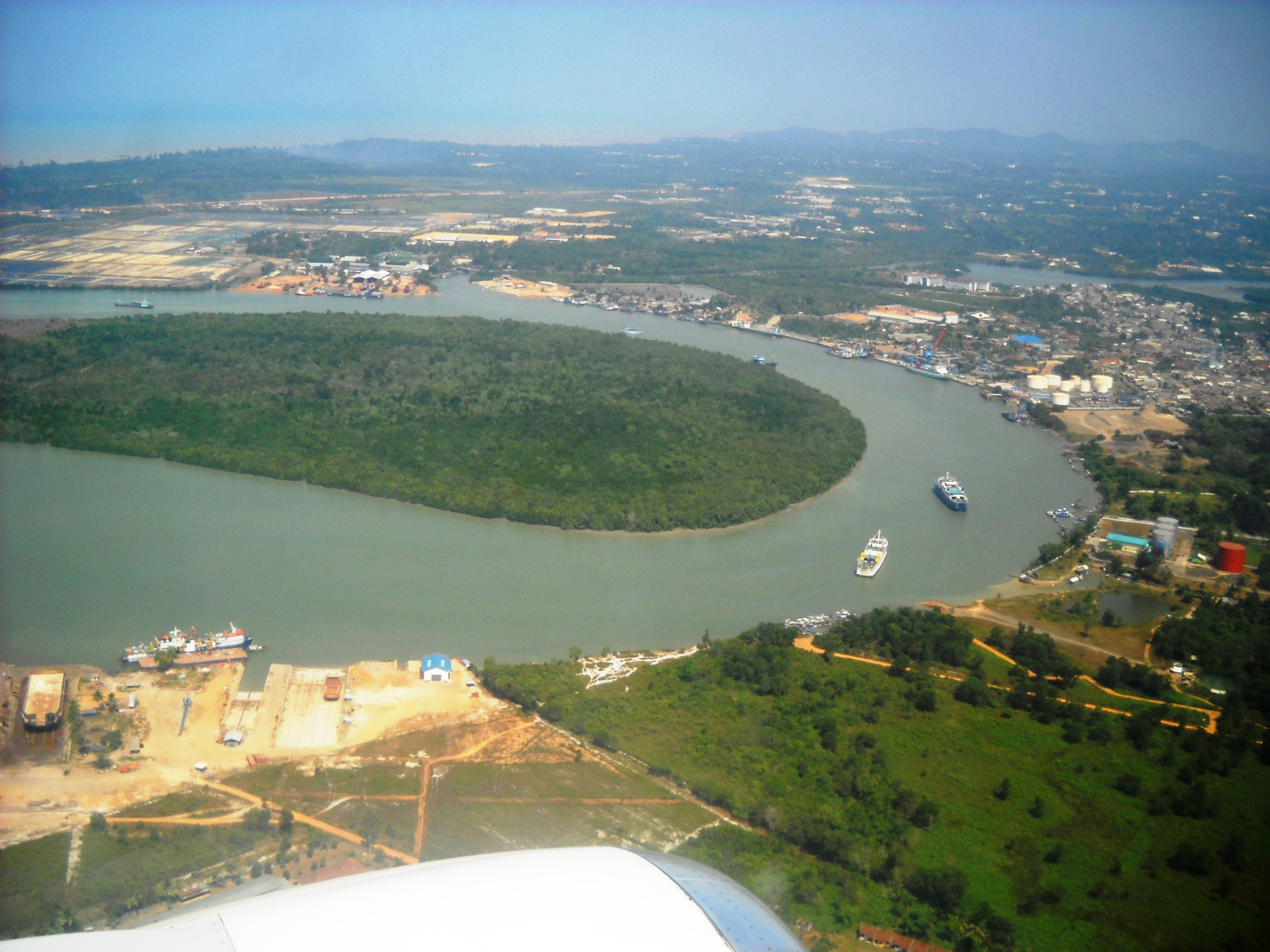
- Aerial view of the port as of 2012
- Click on the map for a fullscreen view

Location
- Country: Indonesia
- Location: Pangkal Pinang, Bangka Belitung
- Coordinates: 2°05′57.5″S 106°07′47.8″E

Details
- Owned by: PT Pelabuhan Indonesia II
- Size of harbour: 17,840 m^{2}
- No. of berths: 1
- Employees: 26

Statistics
- Vessel arrivals: 3,884 (2014)
- Annual cargo tonnage: 1,647,880 tonnes (2015)
- Annual container volume: 39,152 TEUs (2016)
- Passenger traffic: 107,213 (2015)

Port of Pangkal Balam is a seaport in Pangkal Pinang, Bangka. It is the headquarters for port authorities across the island. The port sits close to the mouth of Baturusa River, it runs just north of the city.

The port serves both Indonesian inter-island and international cargo and passenger services, shipping 31,754 tonnes of tin for export in 2015.

While the port was designed for ships with capacities of up to 4,000 GTs, silting of the river mouth has reduced its capacity and efficiency, resulting in plans to move the island's primary port elsewhere.
