= Achintya Holte Nilsen =

Indonesian beauty pageant titleholder (born 1999

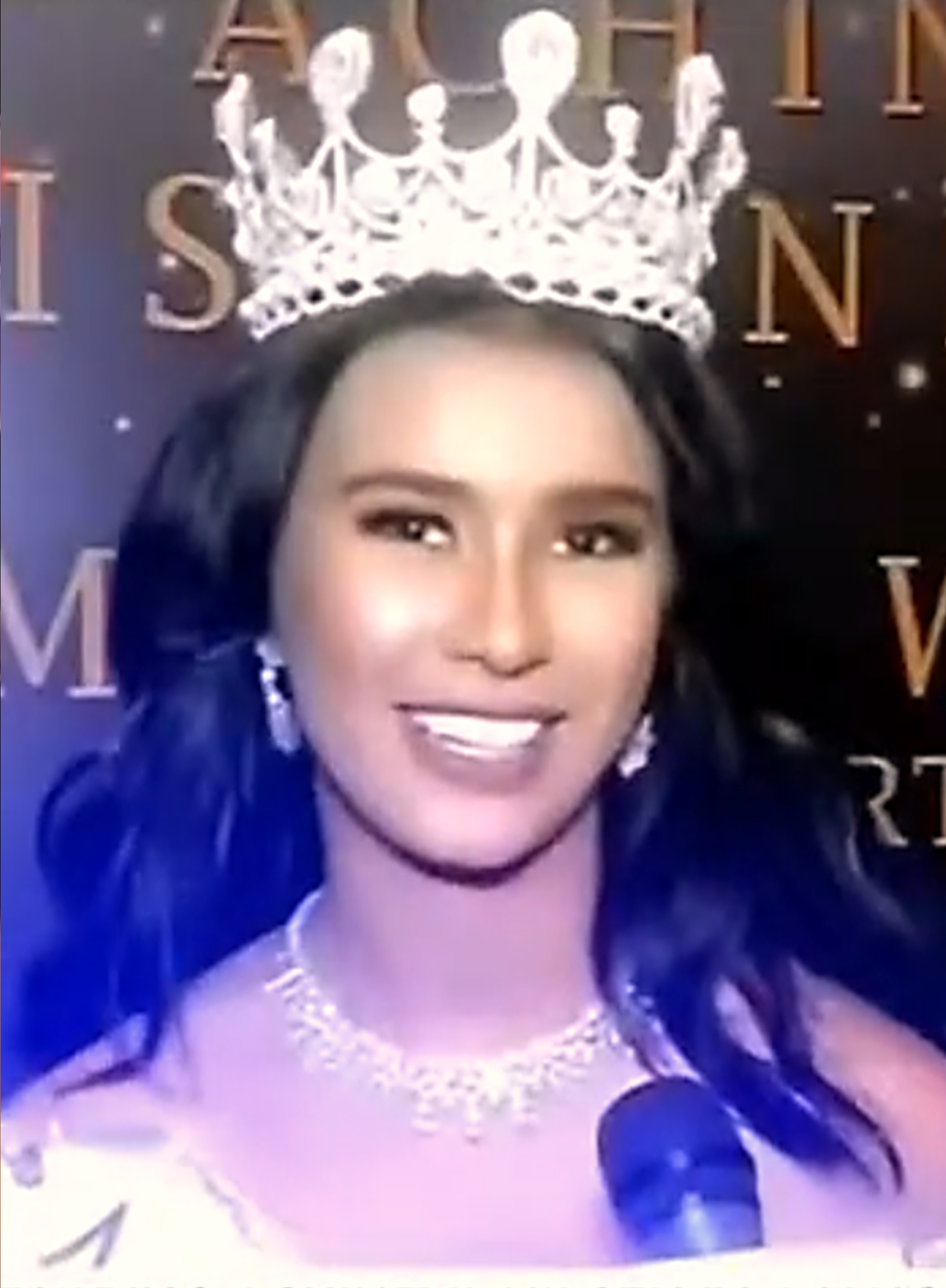
- Nilsen at the Miss World Indonesia 2018 Press conference in 2017
- Born: Achintya Holte Nilsen; 1 January 1999 (age 27); Denpasar, Bali, Indonesia
- Education: Actors Studio-Stockholm (MA; New York University Tisch School of the Arts (BFA)
- Height: 1.78 m (5 ft 10 in)
- Beauty pageant titleholder
- Title: Miss Indonesia 2017
- Major competitions: Miss Indonesia 2017; (Winner); Miss World 2017; (Top 10); (Beauty with a Purpose)
- Website: www.tyanilsen.com

Achintya Holte Nilsen (born 1 January 1999) is an Indonesian beauty pageant titleholder who was crowned Miss Indonesia 2017. She represented Indonesia at the Miss World 2017 pageant and finished in the top 10, winning Beauty with a Purposeand Best Designer Award.

== Early life, background and career ==
Achintya Holte Nilsen was born 1 January 1999 in Denpasar, Bali, Indonesia, to a Balinese mother, Ni Nyoman Parvati from Denpasar – Bali and a Norwegian father, Terje Holte Nilsen from Risør, Aust-Agder County, Norway. She is the niece of Norwegian Olympic cross-country skier Elin Nilsen, and cousin of Olympic speed skater Simen Spieler Nilsen. She worked as a singer and plays the Marimba. Nilsen is a trilingual speaker, she is fluently speak in Norwegian, English and Bahasa Indonesia.

She attended Bali International Green School (primary-secondary) and graduated in 2017. Here she also took part in Greenpeace activism. She holds a bachelor of fine arts degree in Filmmaking and Television from the Tisch School of the Arts in New York City, United States. In 2023, Nilsen obtained her Master of Arts (MA) in Acting program from Actors Studio Stockholm, Sweden. She has represented Indonesia at Bali Model United Nations 2013-2014 and as well as Taiwan Model United Nations 2015.

In 16 November 2018, Nilsen released her very first English poetry book titled “Permanent”. In this book, Nilsen said “My writing has always been an extension of myself, and therefore very personal. As a way to go forward with my vulnerability, I took steps toward sharing my work with close friends, and family”.

In 7 July 2022, Nilsen appeared as the main character in a music video directed by the Stockholm Film School, titled “Under My Skin” with Swedish singer David Elfström Lilja.

== Pageantry ==
=== Miss Indonesia 2017 ===
Nilsen's first pageant was in 2017, when she competed and won the Miss Indonesia national beauty pageant in Jakarta, representing her home province West Nusa Tenggara

The grand finale was held in MNC Studio, Jakarta, Indonesia, on 22 April 2017. Nilsen was crowned by the outgoing titleholder of Miss Indonesia 2016 and the Miss World 2016 2nd Runner-up, Natasha Mannuela Halim of Bangka Belitung. The president of Miss World organization Julia Morley and Miss World 2016, Stephanie Del Valle of Puerto Rico attended the awarding night.

Her final answer on the pageant itself is praised by the current President Joko Widodo:

If chosen as Miss Indonesia, it is my hope to starts working on my Beauty with a Purpose project which benefits villagers still living in extreme poverty. My belief is that by lifting Indonesia out of poverty, we also create equality and we raised our position in the world's eye.

Nilsen's reign as Miss Indonesia 2017 ended on 22 February 2018, when she crowned her successor Alya Nurshabrina from West Java as Miss Indonesia 2018 in MNC Studio, Jakarta, Indonesia.

=== Miss World 2017 ===
As Miss Indonesia 2017, Nilsen represented Indonesia at Miss World 2017, held in Sanya City Arena, Sanya, China, on 18 November 2017. During the pageant, she won a Head-to-Head Challenge, beating other countries in the group with her Olympic rings answer.

I think one symbol that best represents Indonesia would have to be the Olympic symbol, because there's a variety of colors which i think connects to our diversity, and differences, and all the creativity in Indonesia. But it (the ring on the symbol) also all connected which i believe represents our unity.

At the Finale, Nilsen was placed in the top 10 finalists and was also declared as the winner of Beauty with a Purpose and "Best Designer Award" in the pageant. Stephanie Del Valle of Puerto Rico crowned Manushi Chhillar of India as the new titleholder at the end of the event.

Awards and achievements
Preceded by Natasha Mannuela Halim	Miss Indonesia; 2017	Succeeded by Alya Nurshabrina
Preceded by Indonesia – Natasha Mannuela Halim	Miss World Asia; 2017	Succeeded by Thailand – Nicolene Pichapa Limsnukan
Preceded by Indonesia – Natasha Mannuela Halim	Beauty with a Purpose; 2017	Succeeded by Nepal – Shrinkhala Khatiwada
