= Alya Nurshabrina =

Indonesian model, Miss Indonesia 2018

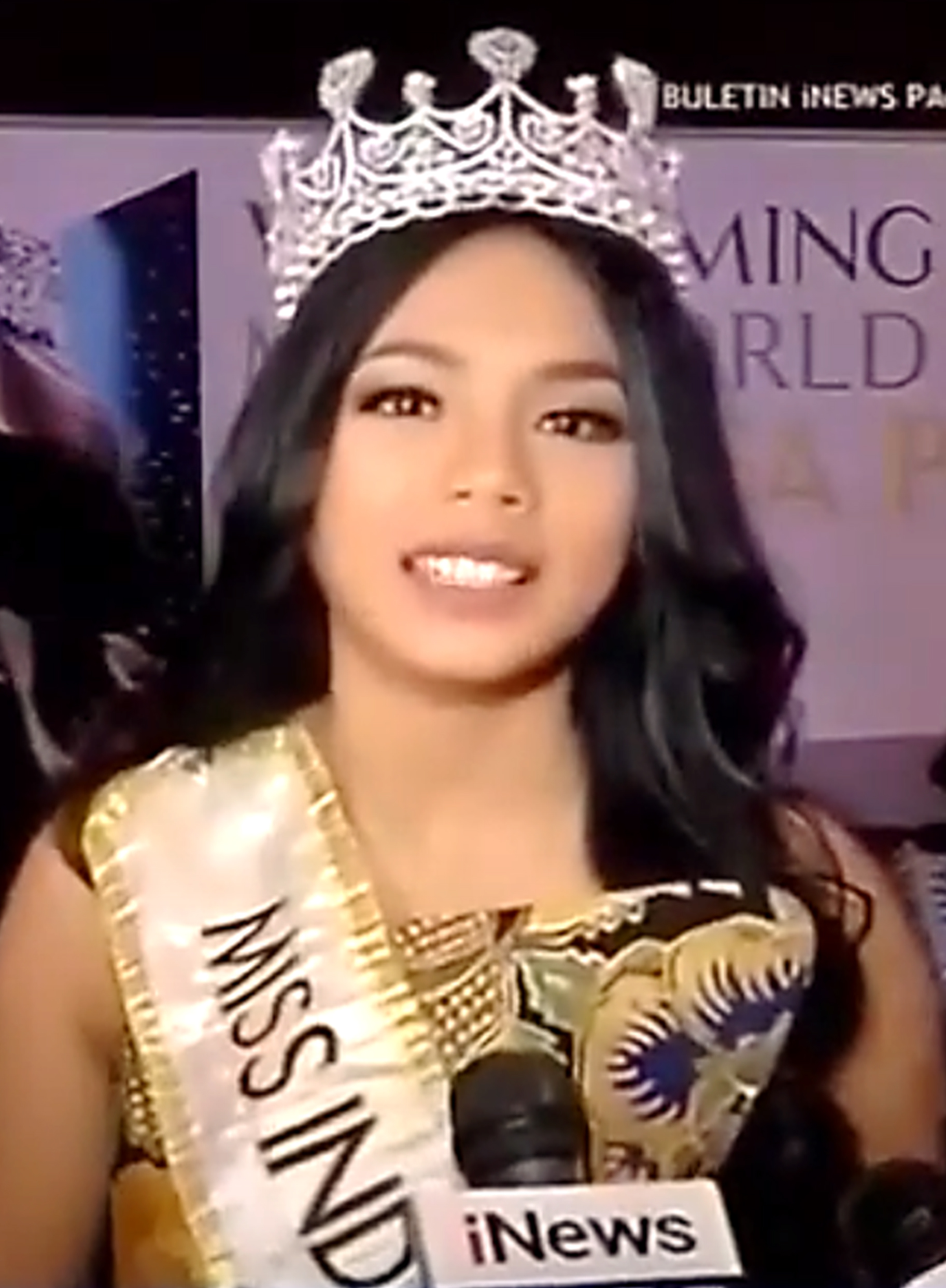
- Samadikun as Miss Indonesia 2018
- Born: Alya Nurshabrina Samadikun; 21 January 1996 (age 30); Bandung, West Java, Indonesia
- Education: Parahyangan Catholic University
- Beauty pageant titleholder
- Title: Miss Indonesia 2018
- Major competitions: GADIS Sampul 2012; (Top 40); The Face of Femina 2014; (Winner); Miss Indonesia 2018; (Winner); Miss World 2018; (Top 30)

Alya Nurshabrina Samadikun (born 21 January 1996) is an Indonesian beauty pageant titleholder. She represented the province of West Java and won Miss Indonesia 2018 on 22 February 2018. She then represented Indonesia at Miss World 2018 in China.

Previously, Alya was a top 40 finalist of GADIS Sampul 2012 and the face of Femina 2014.

== Early life and education ==
Since 2011, Alya has been a coach and motivator at Adam Khoo Learning Technologies Group (AKLTG), an institution from Singapore that provides learning skills and life motivation for teenagers and children.

== Social activities ==
Outside her academic and modelling activities, Alya is also active in charity work. In 2016, was a volunteer at Chay Ya Nepal, where she participated in a school building program in Yamunadanda Village, Sindhupalchok District, Nepal that collapsed after the April 2015 Nepal earthquake. She also a volunteered at the non-profit group Sahabat Peduli Indonesia, co-designing the logo and participating in their education initiatives. She taught art, teamwork activities and recycled garbage for children around Ngurbloat Beach, Maluku Tenggara in 2017. She was also the co-initiator and illustrator of Kabayan children storybook about recycling plastic wastes.

== Pageantry ==
=== Wajah Femina 2014 ===
Alya Nurshabrina was the first Winner of Wajah Femina 2014, at the XXI Ballroom Djakarta Theater, Jakarta on Thursday, 4 December 2014.

As the winner of Wajah Femina, Alya took part in Femina's road show. In addition, she represented Femina at the World Wide Views on Climate and Energy public consultation event. In 2015, Samadikun represented her university at the Melaka International Youth Dialogue held in Melaka, Malaysia.

=== Miss Indonesia 2018 ===
Alya represented the province of West Java and won at Miss Indonesia 2018. She was chosen as a top 16 finalist by winning Beauty with a Purpose. In a question about her integrity when she faces a test, Samadikun replied:

I think to face that, my formula is and always has been the same; E plus R equals O, that is Event plus Response equals Outcome. Therefore, no matter what kind of challenges I may face, when I decide to put a positive response, I will get a positive outcome as well. That, to me, is integrity.

After winning Miss Indonesia, Samadikun represented Indonesia at Miss World 2018 in China.

=== Miss World 2018 ===
Alya represented Indonesia at Miss World 2018 where she competed to succeed Manushi Chillar of India. Alya succeeded in several fast track competition including 1st Runner-up of Beauty With a Purpose, Top 18 Miss World Talent, and Top 5 Multimedia. On the final night she made into the Top 30 among 118 contestants around the world.

Awards and achievements
Preceded by Achintya Holte Nilsen	Miss Indonesia; 2018	Succeeded by Princess Megonondo
Preceded by Grace Kencana Pranata	Miss Indonesia West Java; 2018	Succeeded by Annastasya Widjaja
