= Maria Harfanti =

Indonesian beauty pageant titleholder

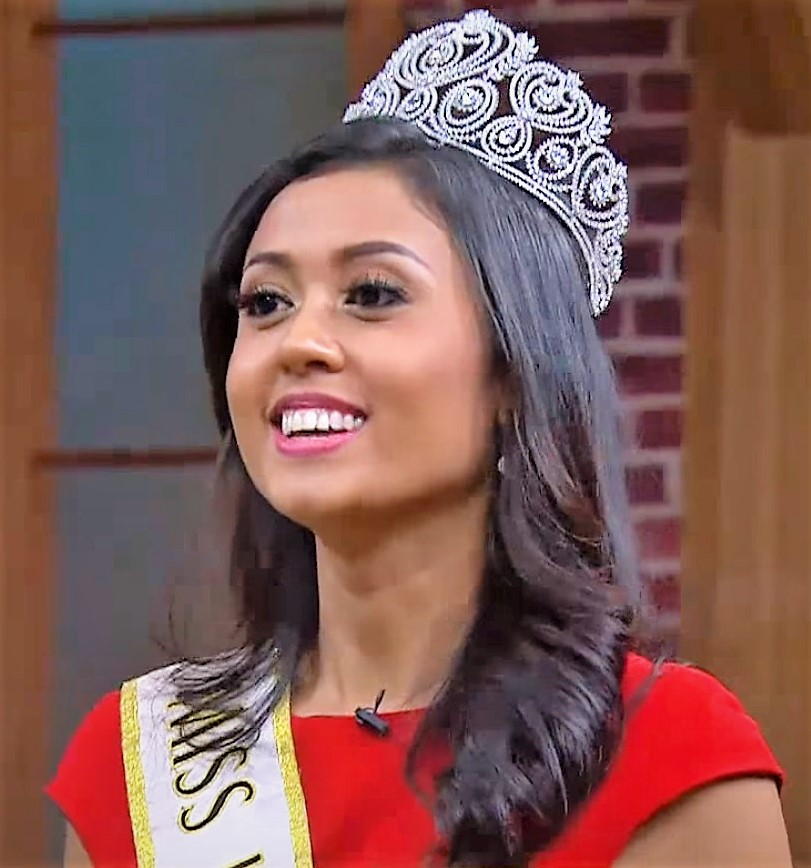
- Harfanti in 2017
- Born: Yogyakarta, Indonesia
- Beauty pageant titleholder
- Title: Miss Indonesia 2015
- Major competitions: Miss Indonesia 2015; (Winner); (Beauty with a Purpose); Miss World 2015; (2nd Runner-up); (Miss World Asia); (Beauty with a Purpose)

Maria Harfanti is an Indonesian beauty pageant titleholder who won Miss Indonesia 2015. She represented Indonesia at Miss World 2015 and was second runner up, and Miss World Asia 2015.

== Filmography ==
- 2016 - Selamat Malam Indonesia, AnTV as a Host
- 2017 - Miss Indonesia 2017 as a Judge
- 2017 - Big Circle, Metro TV as a Co-Host
- 2018 - Miss Indonesia 2018 as a Judge
- 2018 - Forum Duta Besar, TVRI as a Host
- 2019 - Miss Indonesia 2019 as a Judge
- 2020 - Miss Indonesia 2020 as a Judge

== Pageantry ==
Maria Harfanti represented Yogyakarta at Miss Indonesia 2015 on 16 February 2015, at Hall D2 Jakarta International Expo, Jakarta. She also won the Beauty with a Purpose award. Harfanti represented Indonesia and was second runner up at Miss World 2015, in Sanya, China. She also won Miss World Continental Queen of Beauty Asia 2015, and the Beauty with A Purpose challenge event.

Awards and achievements
Preceded by Maria Rahajeng	Miss Indonesia; 2015	Succeeded by Natasha Mannuela Halim
Preceded by United States – Elizabeth Scott Safrit	Miss World 2nd Runner-up; 2015	Succeeded by Indonesia – Natasha Mannuela Halim
Preceded by India – Koyal Rana	Miss World Asia; 2015	Succeeded by Indonesia; Natasha Mannuela Halim
Preceded by Brazil – Julia Gama; Guyana – Rafieya Husain; India – Koyal Rana; Indonesia – Maria Rahajeng; Kenya – Idah Nguma	Beauty With a Purpose; 2015	Succeeded by Indonesia – Natasha Mannuela Halim
