= Miss Indonesia 2016 =

- Date: February 24, 2016
- Presenters: Daniel Mananta, Amanda Zevannya, Robby Purba
- Entertainment: Afgan, Kunto Aji, Yura Yunita, Ayu Ting Ting, Maria Harfanti
- Venue: Studio 14th RCTI, Kebon Jeruk, Jakarta, Indonesia
- Broadcaster: RCTI
- Entrants: 34
- Placements: 15
- Winner: Natasha Mannuela Halim; Bangka-Belitung Islands
- Congeniality: Petrichsia Herman; Papua
- Photogenic: Editha Aldillasari Rodianto; Bengkulu

Miss Indonesia 2016 is the 12th edition of the Miss Indonesia pageant. It was held on February 24, 2016, at Studio 14th RCTI, Kebon Jeruk, Jakarta, Indonesia. Miss World 2015, Mireia Lalaguna of Spain attended the awarding night.

Maria Harfanti as Miss Indonesia 2015 from Yogyakarta Special Region crowned her successor, Natasha Mannuela Halim from Bangka-Belitung Islands. She represented Indonesia in Miss World 2016.

== Judges ==
- Liliana Tanoesoedibjo, founder and chairwoman of Miss Indonesia Organization.
- Peter F. Saerang, professional make-up and hairstylist.
- Noor Sabah Nael Traavik, wife of the ambassador of Norway to Indonesia.
- Wulan Tilaar Widarto, vice-chairwoman of Martha Tilaar Group.
- Ferry Salim, actor, entrepreneur, and ambassador of UNICEF to Indonesia.

== Result ==
=== Placements ===
| Result | Contestant |
|---|---|
| Miss Indonesia 2016 | Bangka Belitung - Natasha Mannuela Halim |
| 1st Runner-up | Bengkulu - Editha Aldillasari Rodianto |
| 2nd Runner-up | North Sumatra - Dian Bernika Ayuningtyas Silalahi |
| 3rd Runner-up | Lampung - Kidung Paramadita |
| 4th Runner-up | Riau Islands - Nabilla Astrid Novianthy |
| Top 15 semifinalist | Jambi - Nita Naomi; Bali - Ni Putu Sukma Astiti; Jakarta Special Capital Region - Yusranie Noory; East Java - Venezia Indra Ghassani; Central Kalimantan - Ellen Gracia Natalia; North Sulawesi - Natasya Maria Magdalena Lasut; West Kalimantan - Olivia Putri Leanartha; South Sulawesi - Cindy Claudia Hanels; Maluku - Leinda Melissa Wattimena; Central Java - Shabira Maharani |

=== Fast Track Event ===
Fast track events held during preliminary round and the winners of Fast Track events are automatically qualified to enter the semifinal round. This year's fast track events include : Talent, Catwalk (Modeling), Sports, Nature and Beauty Fashion, Social Media, And Beauty with a Purpose.

| Category | Contestant |
|---|---|
| Talent | Jambi - Nita Naomi |
| Catwalk (Top Model) | Bali - Ni Putu Sukma Astiti |
| Sports | Jakarta Special Capital Region - Yusranie Noory Assipalma |
| Nature and Beauty Fashion | Lampung - Kidung Paramadita |
| Social Media | North Sumatra - Dian Bernika Ayuningtyas Silalahi |
| Beauty with a Purpose | Bengkulu - Editha Aldillasari Rodianto |

=== Special Awards ===
| Award | Contestant |
|---|---|
| OVALE's Most Beautiful Skin | Central Kalimantan - Ellen Gracia Natalia |
| ADVAN Miss Social Inspiration | East Kalimantan - Tasya Yaumil Amalia |
| Systema Solution's Miss Photogenic | Bengkulu - Editha Aldillasari Rodianto |
| Miss Online | West Sumatra - Annisa Astari Savira Lubis |
| Miss Lifestyle | Jakarta Special Capital Region - Yusranie Noory |
| Miss Congeniality | Papua - Petrichsia Herman |
| Miss Favorite | Central Kalimantan - Ellen Gracia Natalia |

== Contestants ==
Contestants of Miss Indonesia 2016 from 34 Provinces in Indonesia.

| Province | Delegate | Age | Height | Hometown |
|---|---|---|---|---|
| Aceh | Cut Flavia Celly Jatmiko | 21 | 1.68 m (5 ft 6 in) | Lhokseumawe |
| Bali | Ni Putu Sukma Astiti | 20 | 1.75 m (5 ft 9 in) | Denpasar |
| Bangka Belitung Islands | Natasha Mannuela Halim | 21 | 1.73 m (5 ft 8 in) | Pangkal Pinang |
| Banten | Namira Yasqi Nasution | 23 | 1.70 m (5 ft 7 in) | Tangerang |
| Bengkulu | Editha Aldillasari Rodianto | 23 | 1.68 m (5 ft 6 in) | Bengkulu |
| Central Java | Shabira Maharani | 21 | 1.72 m (5 ft 7 1/2 in) | Semarang |
| Central Kalimantan | Ellen Gracia Natalia | 19 | 1.70 m (5 ft 7 in) | Singkawang |
| Central Sulawesi | Vanya Pratita Oetomo | 21 | 1.70 m (5 ft 7 in) | Jakarta |
| East Java | Venezia Indra Ghassani | 20 | 1.68 m (5 ft 6 in) | Madiun |
| East Kalimantan | Tasya Yaumil Amalia | 21 | 1.70 m (5 ft 7 in) | Samarinda |
| East Nusa Tenggara | Nen Maria Greisakti Rongkos | 19 | 1.75 m (5 ft 9 in) | West Manggarai |
| Gorontalo | Agnes Amalia | 18 | 1.69 m (5 ft 6 1/2 in) | Gorontalo City |
| Jakarta Special Capital Region | Yusranie Noory Assipalma | 18 | 1.73 m (5 ft 8 in) | Jakarta |
| Jambi | Nita Naomi | 20 | 1.70 m (5 ft 7 in) | Surabaya |
| Lampung | Kidung Paramadita | 23 | 1.72 m (5 ft 7 1/2 in) | Bandar Lampung |
| Maluku | Leinda Melissa Wattimena | 17 | 1.74 m (5 ft 8 1/2 in) | Ambon |
| North Kalimantan | Diana Puspasari | 20 | 1.72 m (5 ft 7 1/2 in) | Tarakan |
| North Maluku | Shinta Noppita Sari | 22 | 1.70 m (5 ft 7 in) | Madiun |
| North Sulawesi | Natasya Maria Magdalena Lasut | 23 | 1.68 m (5 ft 6 in) | Manado |
| North Sumatra | Dian Bernika Ayuningtyas Silalahi | 23 | 1.73 m (5 ft 8 in) | Medan |
| Papua | Petrichsia Herman | 20 | 1.68 m (5 ft 6 in) | Timika |
| Riau | Kathryn Liza Mentari Sibero | 18 | 1.70 m (5 ft 7 in) | Pekanbaru |
| Riau Islands | Nabilla Astrid Novianthy | 22 | 1.70 m (5 ft 7 in) | Batam |
| South Kalimantan | Herawati | 23 | 1.74 m (5 ft 8 1/2 in) | Banjarmasin |
| South Sulawesi | Cindy Claudia Hanels | 19 | 1.68 m (5 ft 6 in) | Makasar |
| South Sumatra | Maria Chelsea Tiffany | 20 | 1.70 m (5 ft 7 in) | Palembang |
| Southeast Sulawesi | Kartika Ayu Kharisma | 23 | 1.70 m (5 ft 7 in) | Jakarta |
| West Java | Zahra Amalina | 20 | 1.71 m (5 ft 7 1/2 in) | Bandung |
| West Kalimantan | Olivia Putri Leanartha | 18 | 1.69 m (5 ft 6 1/2 in) | Pontianak |
| West Nusa Tenggara | Jessica Risdiana | 18 | 1.71 m (5 ft 7 1/2 in) | Mataram |
| West Papua | Deninda Fairuzahra | 21 | 1.68 m (5 ft 6 in) | Raja Ampat |
| West Sulawesi | Yunike Hari Fransisca | 21 | 1.68 m (5 ft 6 in) | Mamuju |
| West Sumatra | Annisa Astari Savira Lubis | 21 | 1.71 m (5 ft 7 1/2 in) | Pasaman |
| Yogyakarta Special Region | Shidna Takhiya Annisa | 19 | 1.73 m (5 ft 8 in) | Yogyakarta |
