= Pangkalpinang =

Capital and largest city of Bangka Belitung Islands, Indonesia

Pangkalpinang: 槟港; 檳港; Pin-kong
- City
- City of Pangkalpinang; Kota Pangkalpinang

Other transcription(s)
  - Jawi: ڤڠكل ڤينڠ
  - Mandarin: 邦加槟港 (Simplified) 邦加檳港 (Traditional); Bāng jiā bīn gǎng (Pinyin)
  - Hakka: 槟港 (Simplified) 檳港 (Traditional); Pin-kóng (Pha̍k-fa-sṳ)
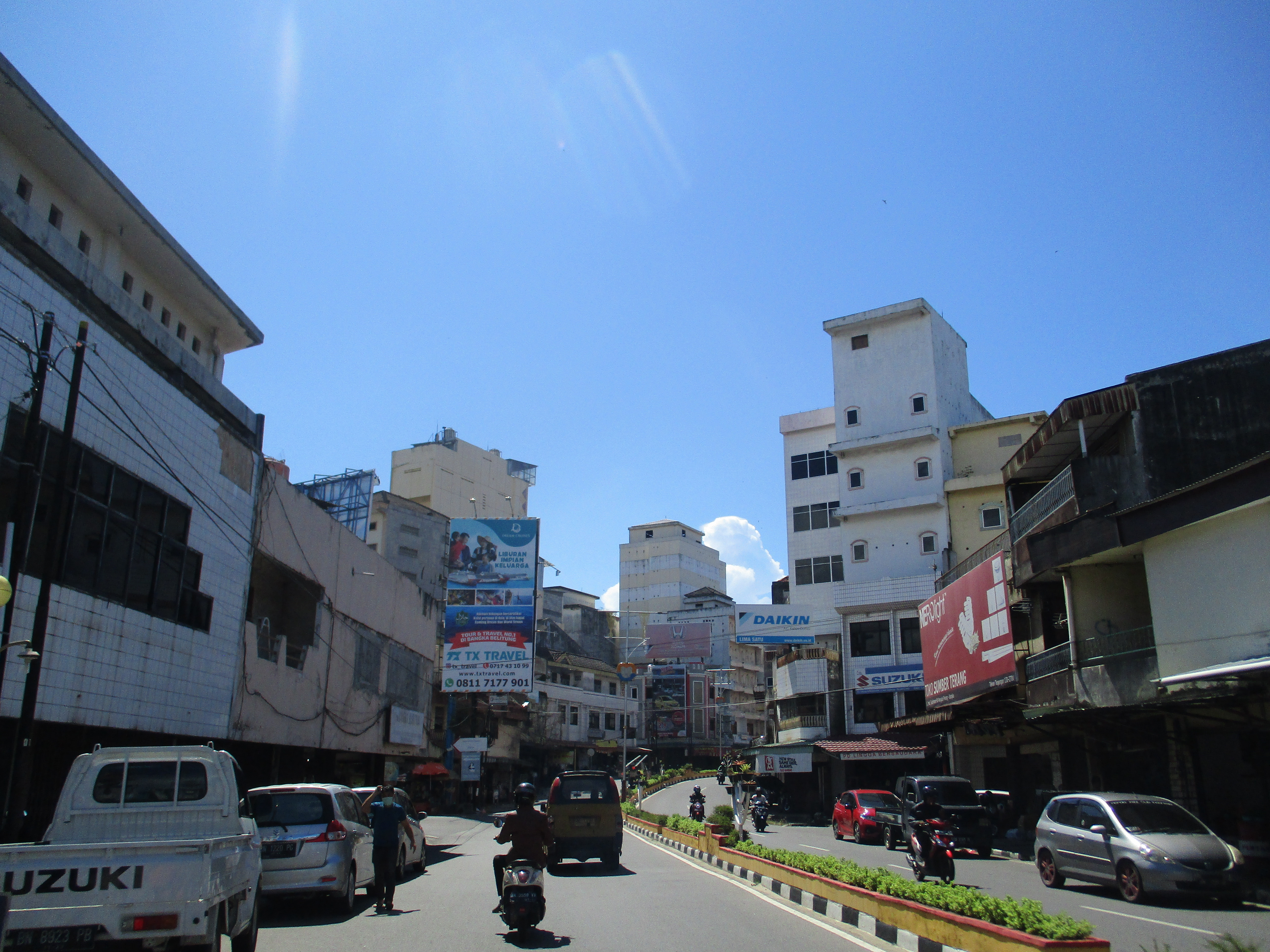
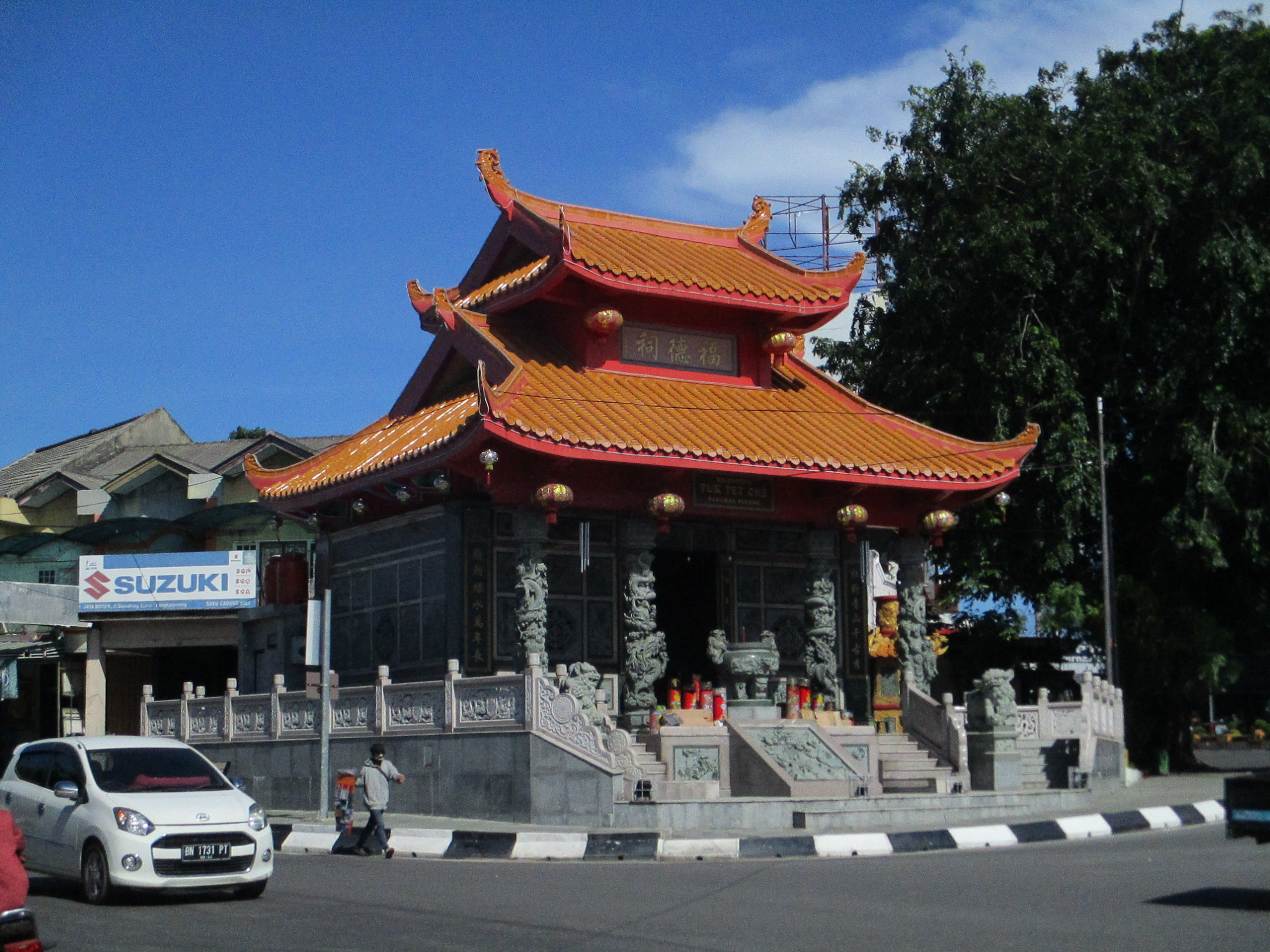
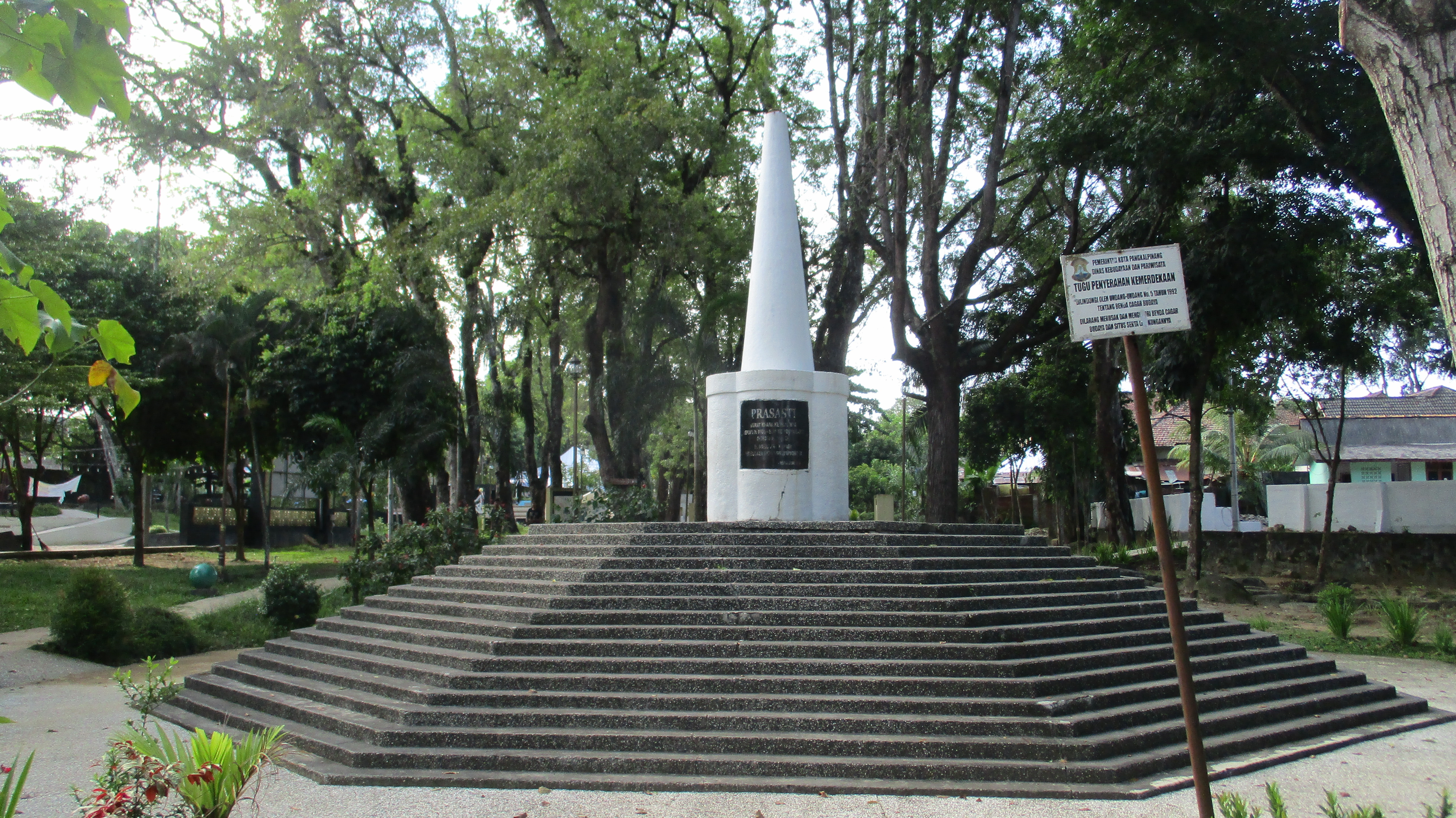
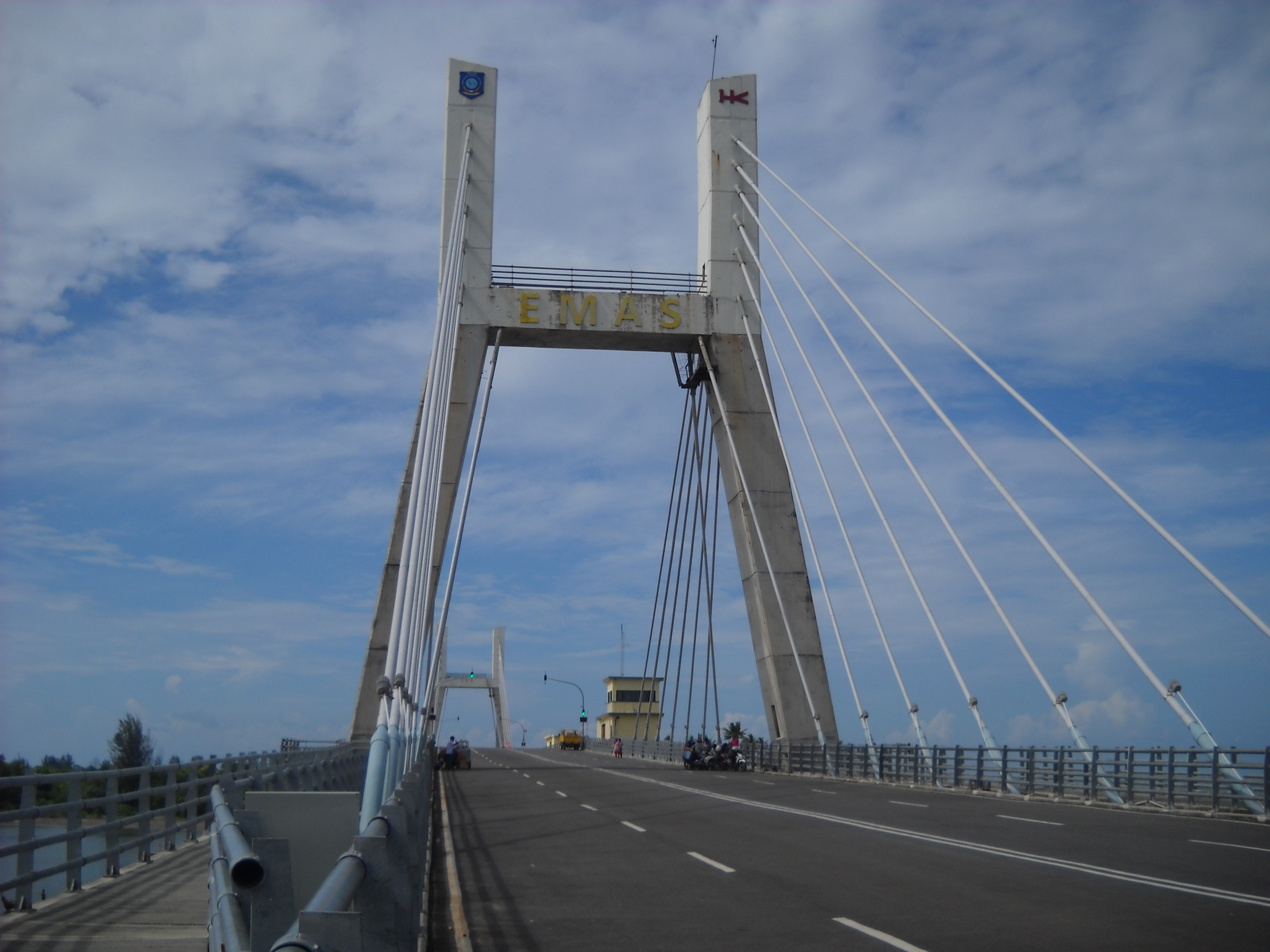
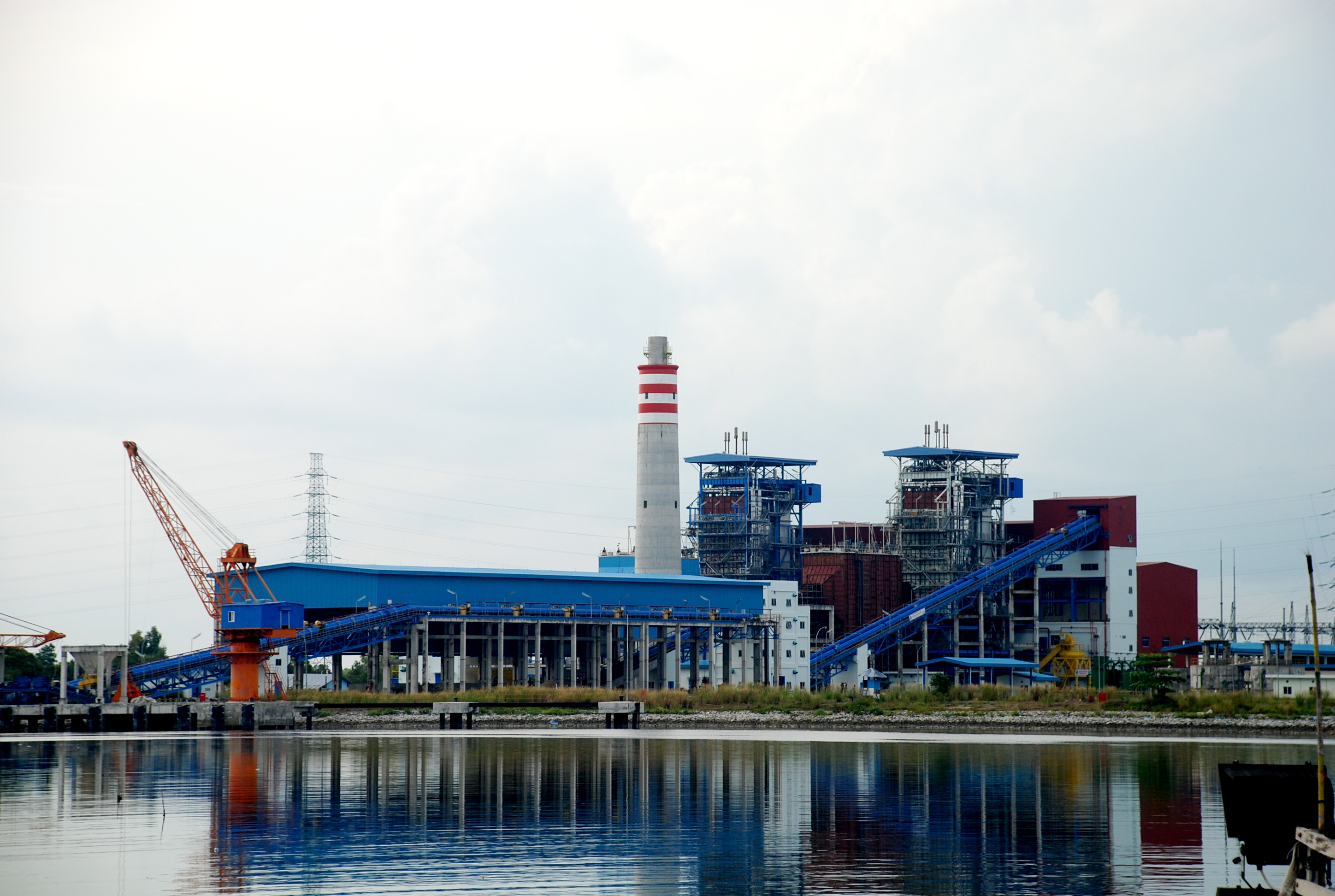
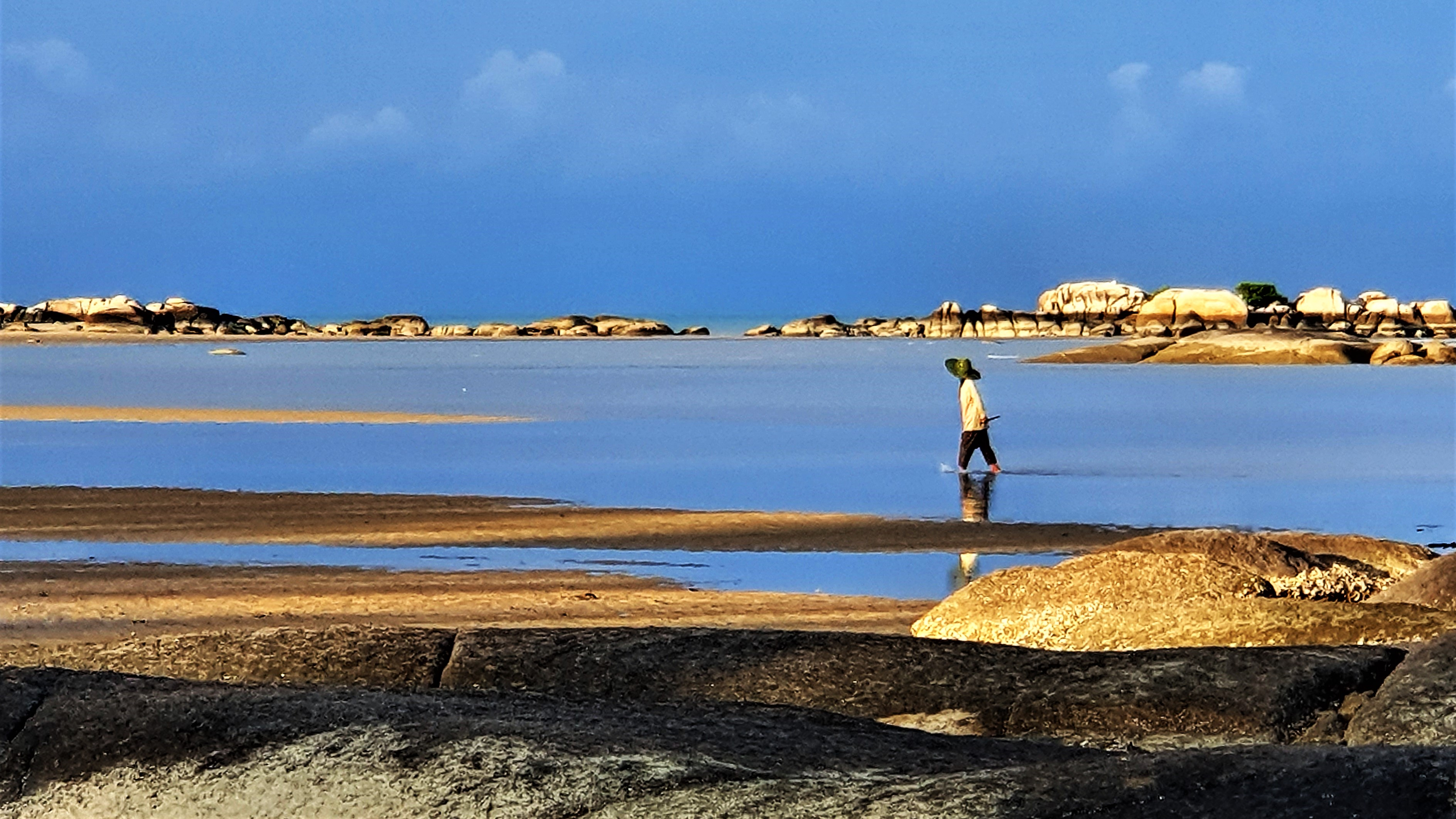
- Pangkalpinang city view Fuk Tet Che Temple Wilhelmina Park Emas Bridge Air Anyir Power Plant Batu Bolong Beach

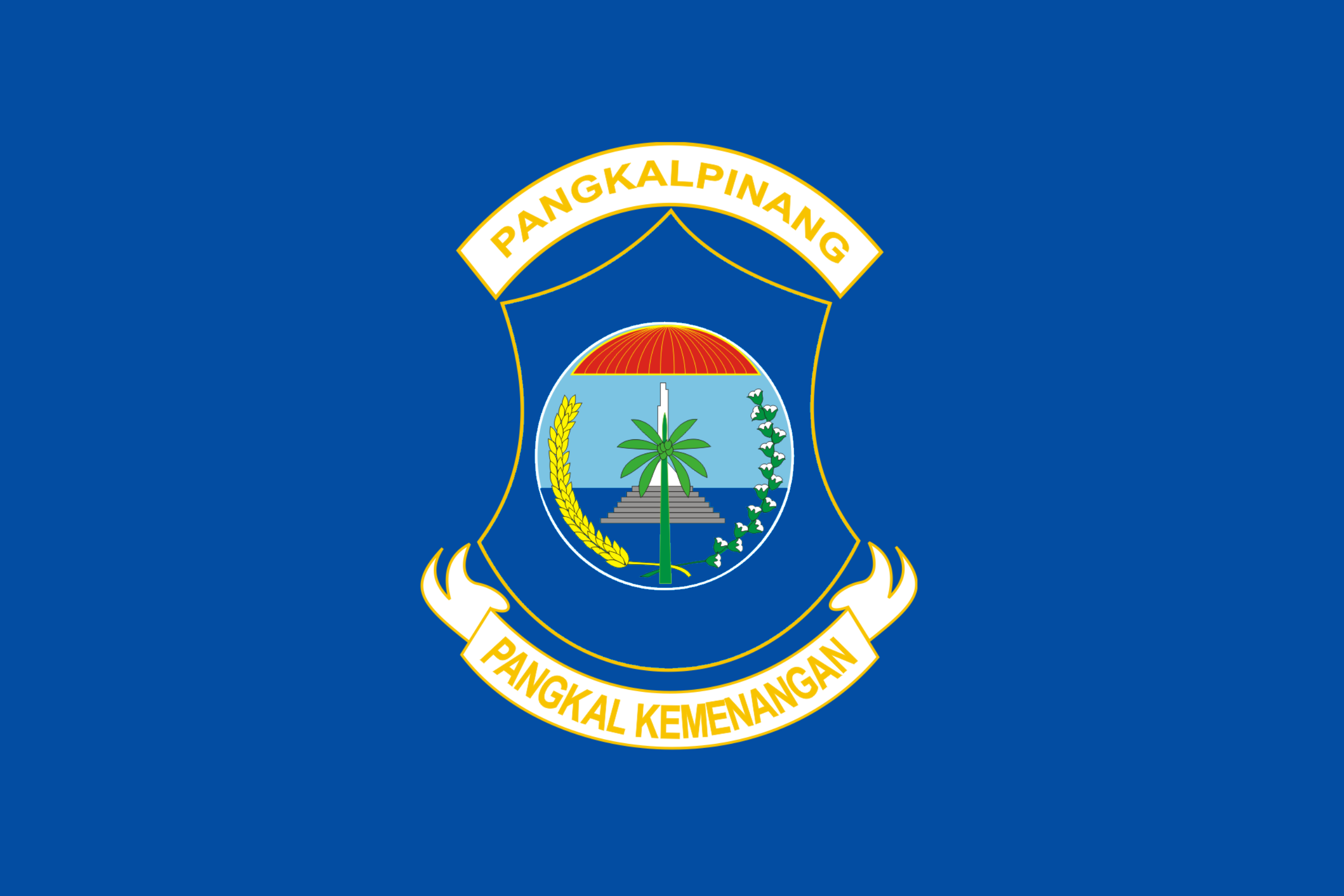
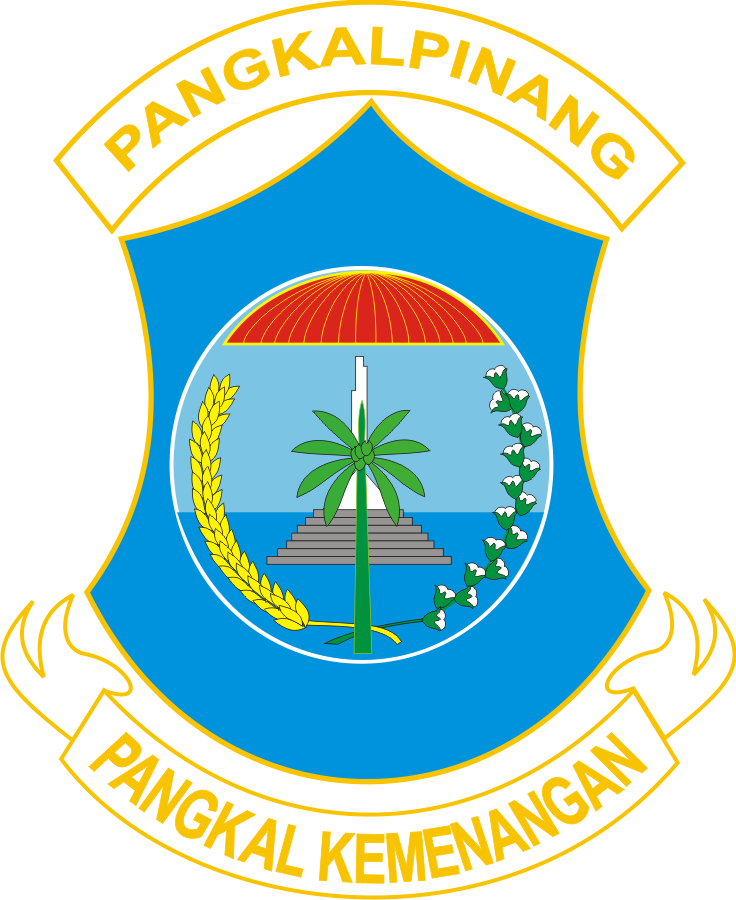
- Flag Coat of arms
- Motto: Pangkal Kemenangan (Malay) "Base of Victory"
- Location within Bangka Belitung Islands

- Location in Sumatra and Indonesia Pangkalpinang (Indonesia)
- Coordinates: 2°8′S 106°7′E
- Country: Indonesia
- Province: Bangka Belitung Islands
- Founded: 17 September 1757

Government
  - Type: Mayor-council
  - Body: Pangkalpinang City Government
  - Mayor: Saparudin (PDIP)
  - Vice Mayor: Dessy Ayutrisna (PDIP)
  - Legislature: Pangkalpinang City Regional House of Representatives (DPRD)

Area
  - Total: 104.54 km^{2} (40.36 sq mi)
- Elevation: 0–13 m (0–43 ft)

Population (mid 2025 estimate)
  - Total: 233,466
  - Density: 2,233.3/km^{2} (5,784.1/sq mi)
- Time zone: UTC+7 (Indonesia Western Time)
- Area code: (+62) 717
- Vehicle registration: BN
- Website: pangkalpinangkota.go.id

Pangkalpinang
- Traditional Chinese: 邦加檳港
- Simplified Chinese: 邦加槟港
Transcriptions
Standard Mandarin
- Hanyu Pinyin: Bāng jiā bīn gǎng
Hakka
- Romanization: Pâng-kâ-pin-kóng
Yue: Cantonese
- Yale Romanization: bòng gàa bàn gōng
- Jyutping: bong1 gaa1 ban1 gong2
Southern Min
- Hokkien POJ: Pang-ka-pin-káng

Pin-kong
- Traditional Chinese: 檳港
- Simplified Chinese: 槟港
Transcriptions
Hakka
- Romanization: Pin-kóng

Pangkalpinang, colloquially written as Pangkal Pinang, also known as Pin-kong in Hakka, is the capital and largest city of the Bangka Belitung Islands Province in Indonesia. It is located on Bangka Island's east coast, the city is divided into seven districts (kecamatan), sub-divided into 42 urban villages (kelurahan).

It covers an area of 89.40 square kilometres (34.52 sq mi) and it had a population of 174,838 at the 2010 Census and 218,568 at the 2020 Census; the official estimate as at mid 2025 was 233,466 (comprising 118,226 males and 115,240 females). The city's average population density was about 2,233 per square kilometre in mid 2025. The Rangkui River divides the city into two parts, and Jalan Merdeka is its geographic center.

Pangkalpinang's population consists largely of ethnic Malays and Hakka Chinese people. There are also smaller immigrant communities of other ethnic groups, such as Batak, Bugis and Minangkabau. Landmarks in the city include the Timah Museum, Jamik Mosque, Fuk Tet Che Chinese temple, the Cathedral of St. Joseph, the Bangka Botanical Garden, and the Pasir Padi beach.

== Etymology ==
Pangkalpinang is derived from the local words pengkal ("base") and pinang (Areca catechu, a species of palm tree widely grown on the island of Bangka).

== History ==
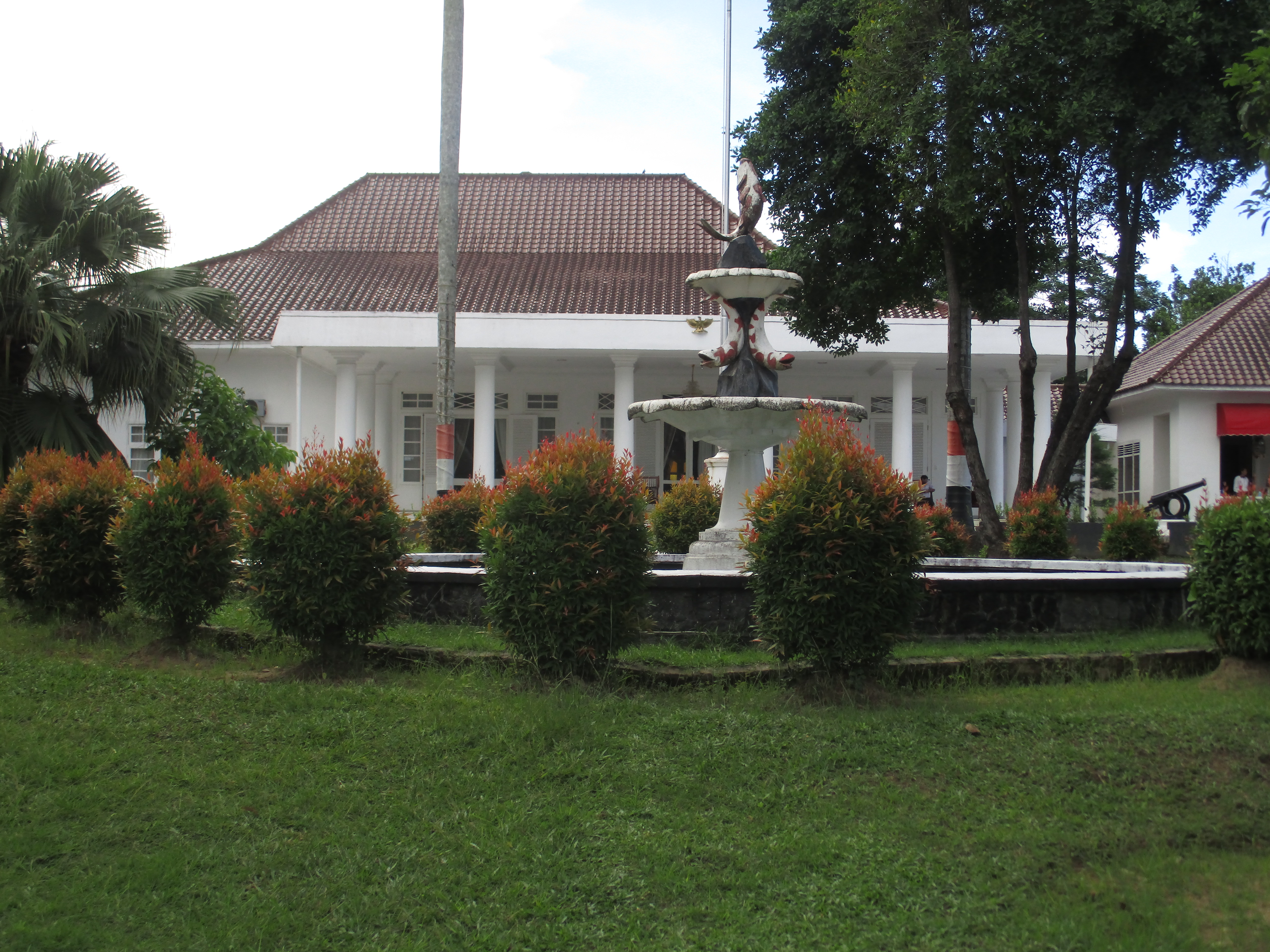
Mayoral residence

=== Pre-colonial rule ===
As part of Srivijaya, Pangkalpinang was inhabited by Hindus. In addition to being a territory of Sriwijaya, it was also a territory of Majapahit and the Mataram Kingdom. In all three kingdoms, Pangkalpinang received little attention despite its proximity to international shipping routes and became a hideout for pirates preying on ships in the South China Sea

To secure the shipping routes around the Strait of Malacca, the Johor Sultanate sent troops to Pangkalpinang, establishing a garrison and began spreading Islam in the region. However, the pirates soon returned.

Years later, in another attempt to rid the area of piracy, the Sultan of Banten sent a regent of the Indonesian archipelago to eradicate the pirates. The regent established control and ruled Bangka until his death, when his authority passed to his only daughter.

=== Colonial rule ===
Around 1709, tin was found on the banks of the Olin River in Toboali District. With the discovery of tin, merchants from China and elsewhere flocked to the region; the Sultan of Palembang sent representatives to China in search of tin experts. In 1717, the Palembang Sultanate began developing trade relationships with the Dutch East India Company (VOC). With the company's help, the sultan attempted to eradicate piracy and tin smuggling.

The Netherlands was occupied by France at the height of the Napoleonic Wars, and the British seized all areas in Nusantara under Dutch governance. In accordance with the Tuntang Agreement, on 18 September 1811 the Dutch handed over the island of Java, Timor, Makassar, and Palembang to the British; Pangkalpinang become a British colony. Stamford Raffles sent emissaries to Palembang to take over the Dutch fort in Sungai Aur, but they were rejected by Sultan Mahmud Badaruddin II. Raffles also demanded the tin mines in Pangkalpinang from Badaruddin.

Raffles sent an expedition to Palembang, led by Rollo Gillespie, on 20 March 1812. Gillespie replaced Mahmud Badaruddin II with Prince Adipati, giving him the title of Sultan Ahmad Najamuddin II, and the new sultan handed over the islands of Belitung and Bangka Islands to the British.

In accordance with the Anglo-Dutch Treaty of 1824, the Netherlands regained areas occupied in 1803 by the British (including Pangkalpinang). The native people were subjected to fraud, extortion, and forced labor by the Dutch and the British. The Dutch exploited the tin reserves; guerrilla warfare was fought in Musi Rawas, and Pangkalpinang fought to expel the Dutch.

During World War II, Bangka Island was occupied by Japanese troops. Although the occupation of Pangkalpinang was brief, shortages of food and clothing were severe.

=== Independent Indonesia ===
After Japan surrendered to the Allies and the Indonesia proclaimed its independence, Pangkalpinang became part of Indonesia. (initially as part of the province of South Sumatra). After the country's political landscape changed, the Bangka Belitung Islands were separated from South Sumatra and combined as a province with Pangkalpinang its capital.

== Demographics ==
Ethnicities of Pangkal Pinang - 2000 Census
| Ethnic group | Percent |
| Malay | 45.63% |
| Chinese | 44.27% |
| Javanese | 8.60% |
| Other | 0.72% |

Pangkalpinang's population was 108,411 in 1990, and 174,838 in the 2010 census, rising to 218,568 at the 2020 Census; the official estimate as at mid 2025 was 233,466. Half are Malay, and primarily speak Bangka Malay. The remainder are Chinese, descendants of 18th-century emigrants from Guangdong province. Locally known as Peranakan (Children of the Indies), they primarily speak Hakka; a small community speaks Cantonese. Their endonym is Thong Ngin (唐人; 'Tang people'), and other Malays are known as Fan Ngin (番人; 'Malay people').

Islam is the largest religion. The Chinese primarily adhere to Buddhism and Christianity, with a minority embracing Taoism and Islam.

== Geography ==
=== Topography ===
The city's topography is generally undulating and hilly, with an altitude of 20–50 metres (66–164 ft) above sea level. Hilly areas are primarily in the west and south, including Mount Girimaya (50 metres above sea level) and Tower Hill. A 290-hectare (720-acre) urban forest is in the Old Village area. An area of 1,562 hectares (3,860 acres) is under cultivation for food crops, fisheries and forestry. Fallow land is 1,163 hectares (2,870 acres), and 4,130 hectares (10,200 acres) are developed. The remaining 2,085 hectares (5,150 acres) are swamps and forest.

=== Geology ===
The city's soil has an average pH below 5, with red-yellow podzolic soil and regosol. A small area is bog soil and light-gray regosol derived from the deposition of sand and clay. Although such soil is less suitable for rice, other crops may be grown. The oldest formations are Permo-Carboniferous limestone, Late Triassic slate and Triassic-Jurassic granite. Composition of the granitic rocks includes dark-colored (occasionally green) biotite and amphibole.

=== Hydrology ===
The Rangkui River flows through the city, and the Pedindang River is in the south. They drain into the Baturusa River, which flows to the South China Sea. The rivers provided transport to markets, and make Pangkalpinang prone to flooding (especially during the rainy season or at times of high tide).

== Climate ==
Pangkalpinang has a tropical rainforest climate (Af) with heavy rainfall year-round. Rain gets noticeably heavier from November to April.

Climate data for Pangkalpinang (Depati Amir Airport) (1991–2020 normals)
| Month | Jan | Feb | Mar | Apr | May | Jun | Jul | Aug | Sep | Oct | Nov | Dec | Year |
|---|---|---|---|---|---|---|---|---|---|---|---|---|---|
| Mean daily maximum °C (°F) | 30.2 (86.4) | 30.6 (87.1) | 31.2 (88.2) | 31.6 (88.9) | 31.8 (89.2) | 31.5 (88.7) | 31.3 (88.3) | 31.6 (88.9) | 32.0 (89.6) | 31.9 (89.4) | 31.3 (88.3) | 30.3 (86.5) | 31.3 (88.3) |
| Daily mean °C (°F) | 26.1 (79.0) | 26.3 (79.3) | 26.5 (79.7) | 26.9 (80.4) | 27.5 (81.5) | 27.4 (81.3) | 27.2 (81.0) | 27.4 (81.3) | 27.5 (81.5) | 27.3 (81.1) | 26.8 (80.2) | 26.2 (79.2) | 26.9 (80.4) |
| Mean daily minimum °C (°F) | 23.5 (74.3) | 23.5 (74.3) | 23.6 (74.5) | 23.9 (75.0) | 24.5 (76.1) | 24.4 (75.9) | 24.1 (75.4) | 24.1 (75.4) | 24.1 (75.4) | 24.0 (75.2) | 23.8 (74.8) | 23.5 (74.3) | 23.9 (75.0) |
| Average precipitation mm (inches) | 284.4 (11.20) | 233.3 (9.19) | 258.9 (10.19) | 244.7 (9.63) | 207.6 (8.17) | 135.4 (5.33) | 131.4 (5.17) | 104.8 (4.13) | 100.3 (3.95) | 169.3 (6.67) | 226.8 (8.93) | 296.1 (11.66) | 2,393 (94.21) |
| Average precipitation days (≥ 1.0 mm) | 18.3 | 13.3 | 16.2 | 15.6 | 14.4 | 11.7 | 10.9 | 7.5 | 7.7 | 11.4 | 16.2 | 19.2 | 162.4 |
Source: World Meteorological Organization

== Administrative districts ==
At the time of the 2010 Census, the city was divided into five districts (kecamatan), but two additional districts were created subsequently. These are all tabulated below with their areas and their populations at the 2010 Census and 2020 Census, together with the official estimates as at mid 2025. The table also includes the locations of the district administrative centres, the numbers of administrative villages or subdistricts (all classed as urban kelurahan) in each district, and its postal code.

| Kode Wilayah | Name of District (kecamatan) | Area in km^{2} | Pop'n Census 2010 | Pop'n Census 2020 | Pop'n Estimate mid 2025 | Admin centre | No. of kelurahan | Post codes |
|---|---|---|---|---|---|---|---|---|
| 19.71.04 | Rangkui | 5.04 | 39,938 | 35,703 | 39,752 | Keramat | 8 | 33132 - 33139 |
| 19.71.01 | Bukit Intan | 35.42 | 43,325 | 41,343 | 45,146 | Air Itam | 7 | 33147 - 33149 |
| 19.71.07 | Girimaya | 4.50 | ^{(a)} | 18,129 | 19,409 | Sriwijaya | 5 | 33141 - 33146 |
| 19.71.03 | Pangkal Balam | 4.72 | 41,055 | 22,142 | 23,116 | Kotapang | 5 | 33111 - 33115 |
| 19.71.06 | Gabek | 20.39 | ^{(a)} | 35,013 | 39,553 | Gabek Dua | 6 | 33111 - 33119 |
| 19.71.02 | Taman Sari | 3.19 | 13,117 | 18,473 | 20,450 | Gedung Nasional | 5 | 33121 - 33127 |
| 19.71.05 | Gerunggang | 31.14 | 37,323 | 47,766 | 57,315 | Bukit Merapin | 6 | 33123 - 33125 |
| | Totals | 104.41 | 174,758 | 218,569 | 233,466 | | 42 | |

Notes: (a) the 2010 population of the areas which later became Girimaya and Gabek districts is included in the figures for the districts from which they were cut out.

== Attractions ==
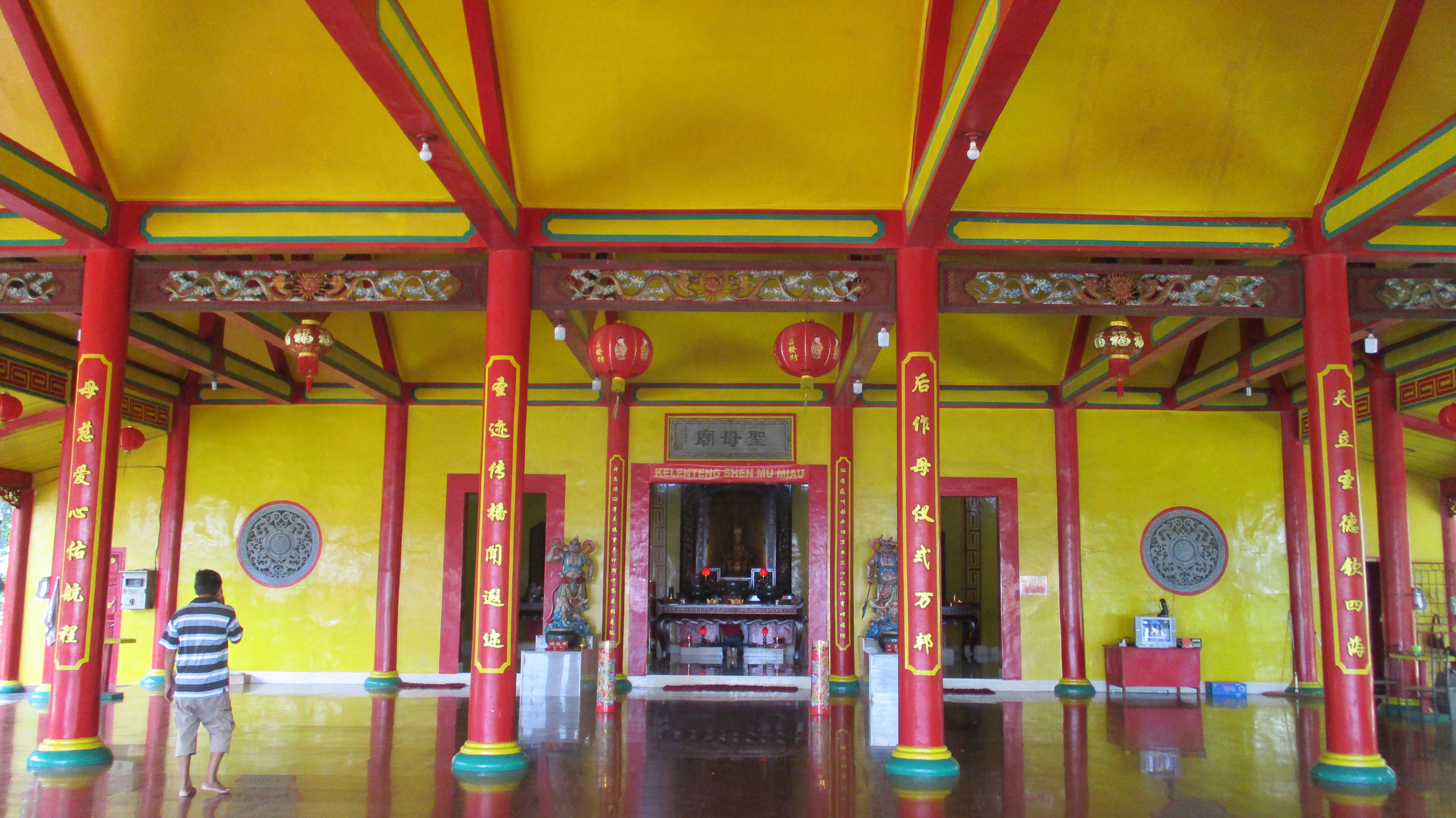
A temple dedicated to Mazu

Nganggung, a food-sharing tradition, is usually performed on religious holidays such as Lebaran and Eid al-Adha. The Qingming Festival (chhin min, 清明, in Hakka Chinese) is also celebrated.

The Tin Museum is Asia's only tin museum, and was the site of the 7 May 1949 Roem–Van Roijen Agreement on the future of independent Indonesia. The 1936 Jamik Mosque, in Jalan Masjid Jamik, is one of the largest and oldest mosques in Pangkalpinang. Kwan Tie Miaw temple (關帝廟), on the Jalan Mayor Muhidin, is one of the oldest temples on the island of Bangka. Formerly known as the Kwan Tie Bio Temple, it is estimated to have been built in 1841 and dedicated to Lord Guan. GPIB Maranatha, originally the Kerkeraad der Protestansche Gemeente to Pangkalpinang, was built in 1927. After independence, the church's name was changed to Western Indonesian Protestant Church (GPIB) Maranatha Pangkalpinang.

== Cuisine ==
Tai Fu Sui (豆腐水), also known as fu sui (腐水) is a popular drink similar to soy milk. Pantiaw or kwetiaw (盤条) is made from sago and rice flour and usually served with fish soup.

== Transportation ==
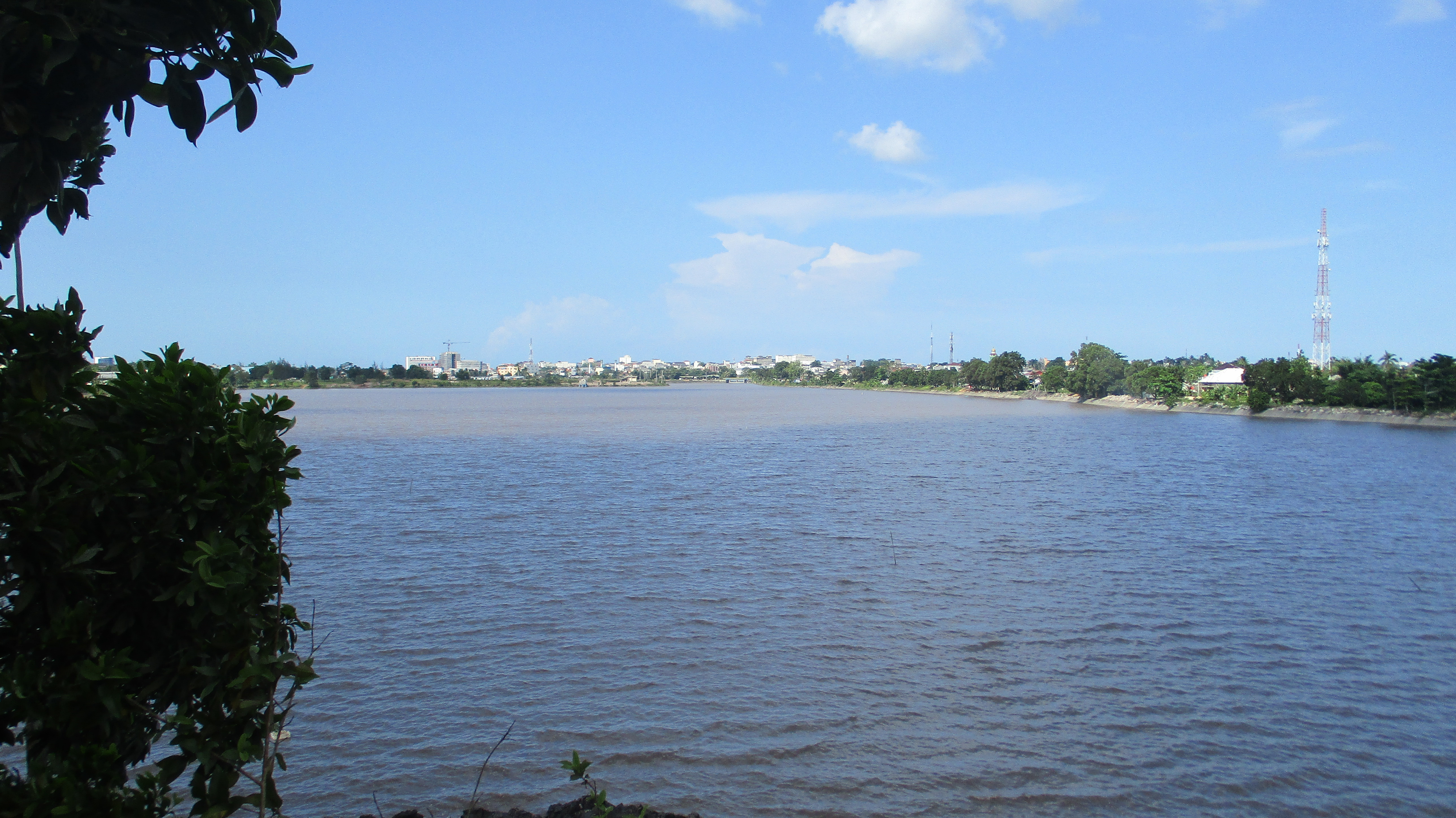
Rangkui River

Angkots are used in and around the city in lieu of public transit.

=== Air ===
Depati Amir Airport is the airport serving Bangka Belitung, with daily flights to Jakarta, Palembang, Tanjungpandan, Surabaya and Batam by Garuda Indonesia, Citilink, Lion Air and Sriwijaya Air. A new terminal began operation on 11 January 2017, with an annual capacity of 1,500,000 passengers and an area of 12,000 square metres (3.0 acres).

=== Sea ===
Pangkal Balam is the city's main seaport, providing daily export and import, inter-island trade and passenger transport to and from Jakarta, Batam, Palembang, Bandar Lampung and Tanjungpandan. Smaller seaports, such as Muntok, serves speedboats to and from Palembang.

== Economy ==
The city's economy is based on agricultural products: food crops, livestock, marine and freshwater fishing and small plantations (rubber, pepper and coconut). Pangkalpinang also has a scenic beach.

== Notable residents ==
- Artika Sari Devi, Puteri Indonesia 2004, Top 15 Miss Universe 2005, actress, model and spokesperson.
- Sandra Dewi, actress and model
- Natasha Mannuela Halim, Miss Indonesia 2016, 2nd Runner-Up Miss World 2016, Beauty with a Purpose winner, actress and model
- Sonia Fergina Citra, Puteri Indonesia 2018, Top 20 Miss Universe 2018 and model

== Sister city ==
- Ambon, Indonesia

== See also ==
- Pangkalpinang Airport
- Roman Catholic Diocese of Pangkal-Pinang
