= Natasha Mannuela Halim =

Indonesian beauty pageant titleholder

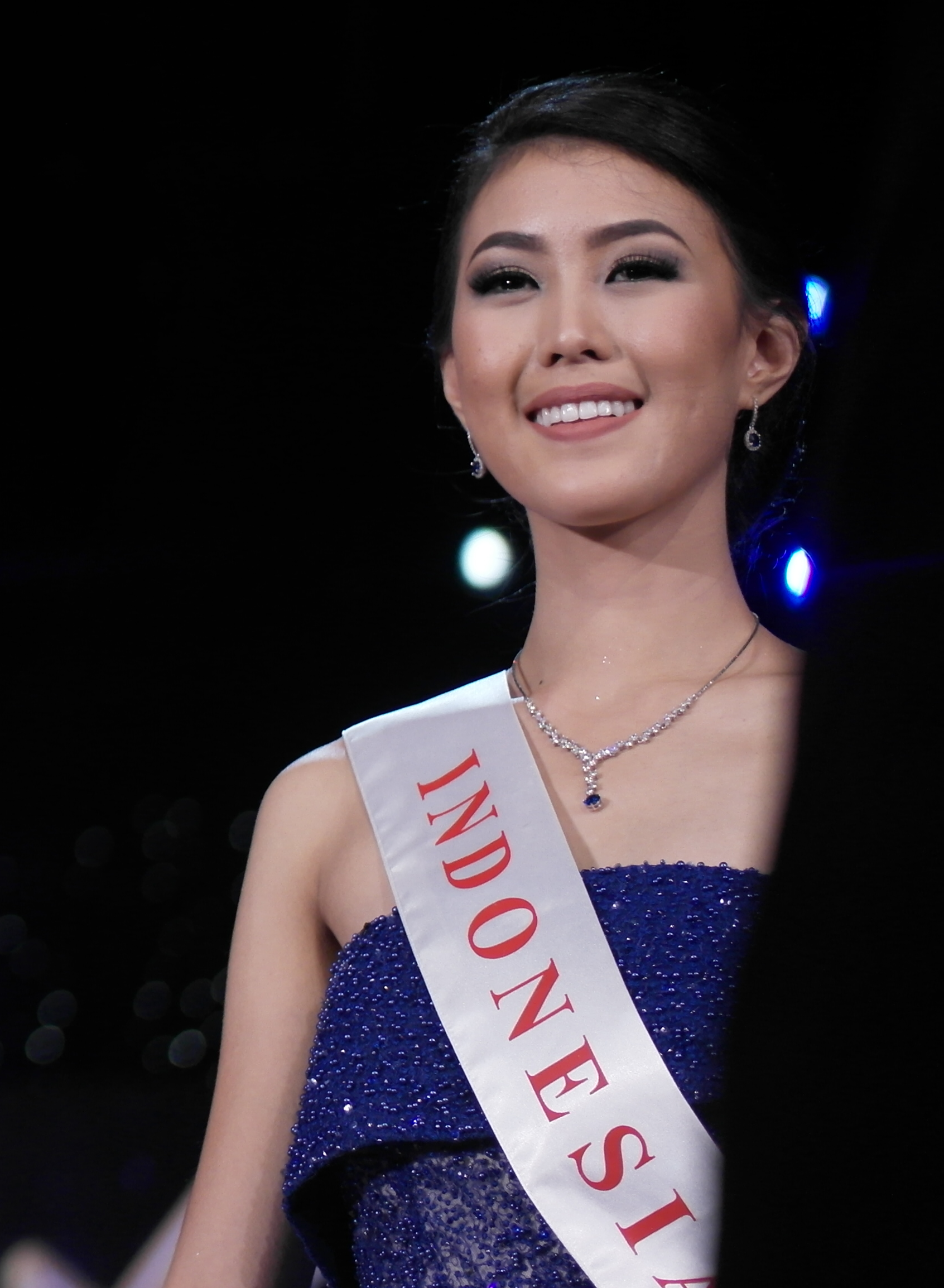
- Natasha Mannuela Halim in 2016.
- Born: Natasha Mannuela Halim; May 9, 1994 (age 32); Pangkal Pinang, Bangka Belitung, Indonesia
- Education: Prasetya Mulya University
- Occupations: Model; ballerina; fashion designer; architecture contractor; beauty pageant titleholder
- Height: 1.78 m (5 ft 10 in)
- Beauty pageant titleholder
- Title: Miss Indonesia 2016 (Winner); Miss World 2016 (2nd Runner-up) (Miss World Asia 2016) (Beauty with a Purpose)
- Years active: 2016–present
- Hair color: Black
- Eye color: Black

Natasha Mannuela Halim (born May 9, 1994) is an Indonesian model, ballerina, fashion designer, architecture contractor and beauty pageant titleholder who was crowned Miss Indonesia 2016, she represented Indonesia at the Miss World 2016, where she was crowned 2nd Runner-up and Miss World Asia 2016, the highest placement for Indonesia so far.

== Biography ==
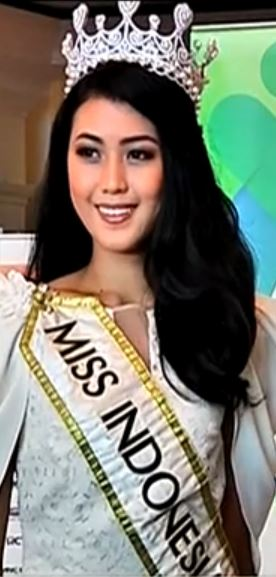
Natasha homecoming party in Pangkal Pinang, Bangka Belitung after being crowned Miss Indonesia 2016.

Natasha born in Pangkal Pinang, Bangka Belitung, she has an interest in ballet, piano and been modelling since she was fifteen. She worked with a team in managing her fashion-line business LOCAPOCA in the early of 2014, by empowering women with disability to work as a creative designers. She is also managing her family business as an architecture contractor

She graduated three and a half years with an international business from Prasetya Mulya University, Jakarta, where she graduated cum laude.

Together with MNC Group, she's taking part as an inspirational speaker on "PlayTalk: Finding Your Voice" platform for the youth. She often involves in social activities that leads her to meet people from different culture backgrounds, Her communication skill with diverse people from all over the world was simply rousing for the audience in "PlayTalk: Finding Your Voice".

== Beauty Pageant ==
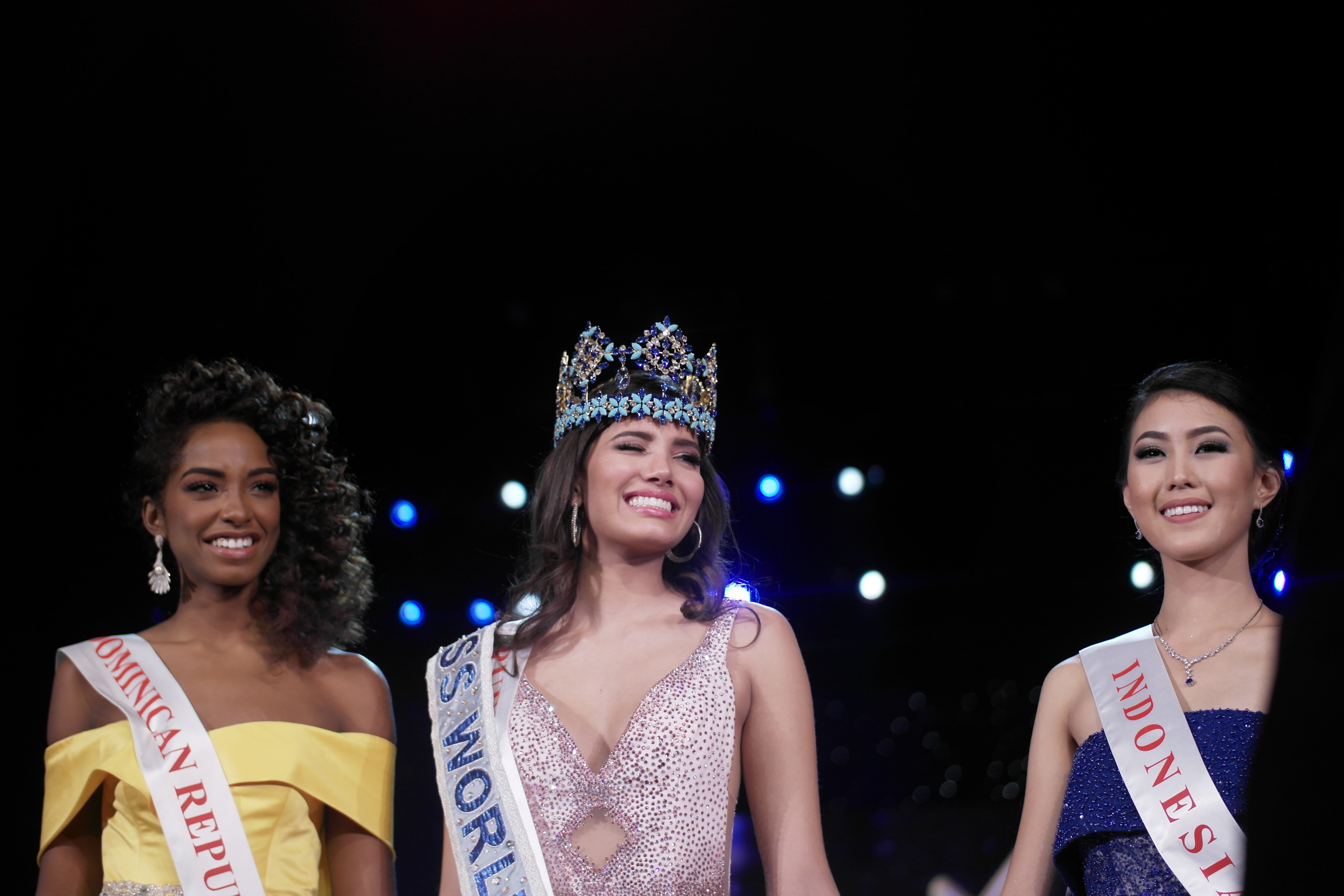
Natasha crowned Miss World Asia 2016 together with Yaritza Reyes and Stephanie Del Valle.

=== Miss Indonesia 2016 ===
Natasha crowned Miss Indonesia 2016 as a representative of the province of Bangka Belitung Islands, at the finals held at the RCTI Studio, Kebon Jeruk, Jakarta-Indonesia, on February 24, 2016 by the outgoing titleholder of Miss Indonesia 2015 and Miss World 2015 2nd runner-up, Maria Harfanti of Yogyakarta and Miss World 2015, Mireia Lalaguna of Spain attended the awarding night.

=== Miss World 2016 ===
As Miss Indonesia 2016, Natasha represented Indonesia in the 66th Miss World 2016 Pageant at the MGM National Harbor, Washington, D.C., United States.

In the finale coronation night of the contest, which was held on December 18, 2016, she was the winner of Beauty with a Purpose 2016 and the continental Miss World Asia 2016, it is the third time in a row where the country won the challenge event Beauty with a Purpose since 2014, and the second time after Maria Harfanti won the continental Miss World Asia 2015. Natasha eventually became the second runner-up of Miss World 2016, following Maria Harfanti who was also the second runner-up of previous year.

Awards and achievements
Preceded by (Special Region of Yogyakarta) Maria Harfanti	Miss Indonesia; 2016	Succeeded by (West Nusa Tenggara) Achintya Holte Nilsen
Preceded by (Indonesia) Maria Harfanti	Miss World 2nd Runner-up; 2016	Succeeded by (England) Stephanie Hill
Preceded by (Indonesia) Maria Harfanti	Miss World Asia; 2016	Succeeded by (South Korea) Ha-eun Kim
Preceded by (Indonesia) Maria Harfanti	Miss World Beauty With a Purpose; 2016	Succeeded by (Vietnam) Đỗ Mỹ Linh
