= Miss Indonesia 2015 =

- Date: February 16, 2015
- Presenters: Daniel Mananta, Amanda Zevannya, Robby Purba
- Entertainment: RAN, Judika, Hanin Dhiya, Angel Pieters, Virzha, Ayu Ting Ting
- Venue: Hall D2 Jakarta International Expo, Jakarta, Indonesia
- Broadcaster: RCTI, MNC Fashion
- Entrants: 34
- Placements: 15
- Winner: Maria Harfanti; Yogyakarta Special Region
- Congeniality: Melayu Nicole Hall; Gorontalo

Miss Indonesia 2015 is the 11th edition of the Miss Indonesia pageant. The pageant has the theme "Beauty in Diversity" It was held on February 16, 2015, at Hall D2 Jakarta International Expo, Jakarta, Indonesia. Miss World 2014, Rolene Strauss of South Africa attended the awarding night.

Maria Rahajeng as Miss Indonesia 2014 from West Sulawesi crowned her successor, Maria Harfanti from Yogyakarta Special Region. She will represent Indonesia in Miss World 2015.

== Judges ==
- Liliana Tanoesoedibjo, Founder and Chairwoman of Miss Indonesia Organization.
- Peter F. Saerang, professional make-up and hairstylist.
- Noor Sabah Nael Traavik, wife of the Norwegian ambassador to Indonesia.
- Wulan Tilaar Widarto, Vice Chairwoman of Martha Tilaar Group.
- Ferry Salim, actor, entrepreneur, and UNICEF ambassador to Indonesia.

== Result ==
=== Placements ===
Result	Contestant
Miss Indonesia 2015	Yogyakarta Special Region - Maria Harfanti
1st Runner-up	South Sumatra - Savina Wibowo
2nd Runner-up	Papua - Yona Luvitalice Miagan
Top 7 finalist	East Java - Patricia Ellen Setiawan; East Nusa Tenggara - Mentari Gantina Putri; Jakarta Special Capital Region - Oky Rizky Sondara Putri; North Sumatra - Sere Kalina Florencia Sitorus
Top 15 semifinalist	Aceh - Ratna Nurlia Alfiandini; Bali - Tjokorda Istri Kumari Maharatu Pemayun; South Kalimantan - Cilia Limantara; South Sulawesi - Andi Annisa Iasyah; West Java - Syntia Fitriyani Layinah; West Kalimantan - Marcia Julia; West Papua - Patricia Atma Novera Hutapea; West Sulawesi - Rosalina Sariowan

=== Fast Track Event ===
Fast track events held during preliminary round and the winners of Fast Track events are automatically qualified to enter the semifinal round. This year's fast track events include : Talent, Catwalk (Modeling), Sports, Nature and Beauty Fashion, Social Media, And Beauty with a Purpose.

Category	Contestant
Talent	West Sulawesi - Rosalina Sariowan
Catwalk (Top Model)	North Sumatra - Sere Kalina Florencia Sitorus
Sports	Papua - Yona Luvitalice Miagan
Nature and Beauty	Bali - Tjokorda Istri Kumari Maharatu Pemayun
Social Media	South Sumatra - Savina Wibowo
Beauty with a Purpose	Yogyakarta Special Region - Maria Harfanti

=== Special Awards ===
Award	Contestant
NourishSkin Most Beautiful Skin	East Java - Patricia Ellen Setiawan
ADVAN Miss Social Inspiration	West Nusa Tenggara - Diandra Zahra Karima
Miss Online	South Kalimantan - Cilia Limantara
Most Beautiful Smile	Kalimantan Tengah -Damita Romauli Argoebie
Miss Congeniality	Gorontalo - Melayu Nicole Hall
Miss Favorite	West Kalimantan - Marcia Julia
Miss Lifestyle	North Sumatra - Sere Kalina Florencia Sitorus

== Contestants ==
Contestants of Miss Indonesia 2015 from 34 Provinces in Indonesia.

Province	Delegate	Age	Height	Hometown
Aceh	Cut Ratna Nurlia Alfiandini	20	1.68 m (5 ft 6 in)	Sigli
Bali	Tjokorda Istri Kumari Maharatu Pemayun	19	1.68 m (5 ft 6 in)	Denpasar
Bangka-Belitung Islands	Anita Carlotta Natayo	22	1.78 m (5 ft 10 in)	Pangkalpinang
Banten	Brenda Theresa Bleumenfeld	20	1.70 m (5 ft 7 in)	Tangerang
Bengkulu	Diana Kusuma Wardhani	19	1.72 m (5 ft 7 1/2 in)	Bengkulu
Central Java	Raihna Ayu Meiska Wardojo	21	1.70 m (5 ft 7 in)	Solo
Central Kalimantan	Damita Romauli Argoebie	18	1.70 m (5 ft 7 in)	Palangkaraya
Central Sulawesi	Prilie Syahadatina	18	1.73 (5 ft 8 in)	
East Java	Patricia Ellen Setiawan	22	1.70 m (5 ft 7 in)	Kediri
East Kalimantan	Adinda Putri	18		Samarinda
East Nusa Tenggara	Mentari Gantina Putri	22	1.67 m (5 ft 5 1/2 in)	
Gorontalo	Melayu Nicole Hall	18	1.73 m (5 ft 8 in)	Gorontalo
Jakarta Special Capital Region	Oky Rizky Sondara Putri	21	1.72 m (5 ft 7 1/2 in)	Jakarta
Jambi	Aldora Handoyo	20	1.68 m (5 ft 6 in)	Jambi
Lampung	Zita Oktaviani Sutirto	20	1.68 m (5 ft 6 in)	Bandarlampung
Maluku	Everdina Catherien Tesalonika Pattipeilohy	20	1.70 m (5 ft 7 in)	Ambon
North Kalimantan	Vivi Wijaya	18	1.68 m (5 ft 6 in)	Binjai
North Maluku	Wahyuningtias	22	1.70 m (5 ft 7 in)	Ternate
North Sulawesi	Nadya Aprilia Syaidin	21	1.72 m (5 ft 7 1/2 in)	Manado
North Sumatra	Sere Kalina Florencia Sitorus	20	1.73 m (5 ft 8 in)	Medan
Papua	Yona Luvitalice Miagan	20	1.68 m (5 ft 6 in)	Jayapura
Riau	Mia Sarah	19	1.70 m (5 ft 7 in)	Pekanbaru
Riau Islands	Megalina	20	1.71 m (5 ft 7 1/2 in)	Tanjung Balai Karimun
South Kalimantan	Cilia Limantara	22	1.68 m (5 ft 6 in)	Banjarmasin
South Sulawesi	Andi Annisa Iasyah	20	1.67 m (5 ft 5 1/2 in)	Makassar
South Sumatra	Savina Wibowo	18	1.68 m (5 ft 6 in)	Palembang
Southeast Sulawesi	Fany Ariani Arsawijaya	21	1.68 m (5 ft 6 in)	
West Java	Syntia Fitriyani Layinah	23	1.67 m (5 ft 5 1/2 in)	Bandung
West Kalimantan	Marcia Julia	18	1.68 m (5 ft 6 in)	Pontianak
West Nusa Tenggara	Diandra Zahra Karima	19		Lombok
West Papua	Patricia Atma Novera Hutapea	21		Jayapura
West Sulawesi	Rosalina Sariowan	23	1.70 m (5 ft 7 in)	
West Sumatra	Rengganis Purwakinanti	20	1.71 m (5 ft 7 1/2 in)	Pariaman
Yogyakarta Special Region	Maria Harfanti	23	1.73 m (5 ft 8 in)	Yogyakarta
