= Murder of Wee Keng Wah =

2005 murder of an elderly woman by her maid in Singapore

Wee Keng Wah
- Wee Keng Wah, the murdered victim
- Born: Wee Keng Wah c. 1930; Singapore, Straits Settlements, British Malaya
- Died: 19 October 2005 (aged 75); Chai Chee, Singapore
- Cause of death: Multiple injuries caused by a fall
- Other name: Hainan Aunty
- Known for: Murder victim
- Spouse: Lee Tang Seng
- Children: 3

On 19 October 2005, 75-year-old Wee Keng Wah (Chinese: 王琼华; Jyutping: Wong4 King4 Waa4; pinyin: Wáng Qiónghuā) was found dead at the foot of her HDB block in Chai Chee, Singapore. On that same day, her 26-year-old Indonesian maid Barokah was arrested and charged with murder. It was later found through investigations that Barokah murdered Wee after the latter caught her sneaking out to meet her lover and Wee threatened to sack her, and Barokah thus had a fight with Wee before pushing her out of the flat window and leading to Wee's fall to death.

Later, after a psychiatrist found that Barokah was suffering from diminished responsibility as a result of depression and dependent personality disorder, her charge of murder was reduced to manslaughter, and Barokah was sentenced to life imprisonment. Later, due to new psychiatric evidence, Barokah's case was approved for a re-trial but eventually, Barokah's life sentence was re-imposed after the trial court found that it was the only suitable sentence to be meted out in light of Barokah's psychiatric state and the cold-blooded nature of the crime. The re-trial verdict was later upheld by the Court of Appeal, which dismissed Barokah's second appeal against her life sentence.

== Murder investigations ==
On 19 October 2005, an elderly woman was found dead at the ground floor of a HDB block in Chai Chee, Singapore. On the same date, an Indonesian maid was arrested for the suspected murder of the woman, who was the maid's employer.

The deceased elderly woman was identified as 75-year-old Wee Keng Wah, who was a resident of the block where she was discovered dead. At the time of her death, Wee, nicknamed Hainan Aunty (海南嫂 Hǎinán Sǎo), was survived by her husband, two sons and one daughter. Wee was living together with her 78-year-old husband Lee Tang Seng (李东成 Lǐ Dōngchéng) in a ninth-floor unit of the same HDB block, while their children were living elsewhere in Singapore and married with children. The maid, who was reportedly married with a son, was alleged to be responsible for pushing Wee to her death, after she was caught sneaking out to meet a man. It was revealed that the maid has previously worked for two families before being hired by Wee, but she switched families within one year before she worked for Wee. Her diary was also seized by police as evidence.

An autopsy was conducted on the victim and the pathologist (who was unidentified) revealed that there were multiple bruises and injuries were discovered on Wee's body, and her face was "flattened" from the fall. These injuries were consistent with Wee having fallen from a height. Several fingernail marks were also found on the elderly woman's neck, implying that Wee had been strangled before she fell, and the various injuries Wee sustained during her fall was sufficient in the ordinary course of nature to cause death. A search at the flat also revealed spots of blood on the floor and bedsheets in Wee's bedroom, suggesting that a fight had taken place and the window grille also did not have signs of contact with Wee's body, which also ruled out the possibility of suicide. Swabs were made on the maid's hands, which discovered traces of Wee's DNA on her fingernails and hands.

On 21 October 2005, Wee's 26-year-old Indonesian maid Barokah was officially charged with murder in the Subordinate Courts of Singapore, and if found guilty of murder in Singapore, she faced the death penalty. Barokah was first placed under police detention for a week to assist in investigations, before the order was extended to one more week due to the police requiring more time to complete investigations.

On 2 November 2005, Barokah returned to court, and she was ordered to be placed under psychiatric remand for three weeks at Changi Women's Prison while awaiting trial for her late employer's murder. On that same day, the police also returned to Wee's flat to collect evidence, including an air conditioner. On 23 November 2005, the police returned to the crime scene a second time to re-enact the crime, and used a mannequin to re-enact Wee's fall to her death.

On 25 October 2005, Wee's funeral took place, and over a hundred friends and relatives attended the wake.

== Background of Barokah ==
Barokah
- Police mugshot of Barokah in 2005
- Born: Barokah; 15 May 1979 (age 47); Central Java, Indonesia
- Occupation: Domestic maid (former)
- Spouse: Isnaini Mislani
- Children: 3
- Status: Imprisoned at Changi Women's Prison since 19 October 2005
- Conviction: Manslaughter (one count)
- Criminal charges: Murder (one count)
- Penalty: Life imprisonment

Born in Central Java, Indonesia on 15 May 1979, Barokah, who goes by one name, was the youngest of several children in her family. Her father was an odd-job labourer and her mother was a rice field worker, and the family lived in a village in Central Java. Barokah, who underwent religious studies in school until the third year of secondary school, was married at the age of 16 in 1995, and her husband Isnaini Mislani worked as a labourer in Malaysia. In August 2003, Barokah had an affair with another married Indonesian man and gave birth to a baby boy, who was later entrusted under the care of a friend after Barokah refused the man's offer to be his second wife, and this refusal also led to the end of the affair. Barokah also subsequently discovered that her husband was also having an affair and she was emotionally affected by it.

In June or July 2005, she met Ali, a Bangladeshi man who befriended her, and she began an intimate relationship with Ali, and she became pregnant with Ali's child. While she was held in remand for murdering Wee Keng Wah, Barokah gave birth to a daughter on 3 July 2006, although many sources at first wrongly stated that Barokah gave birth in May 2006.

Barokah worked for a total of three families in Singapore before she was hired by Wee. The first was a Malay family living in Bukit Batok, where Barokah had worked for 16 months between January 2000 and April 2001. The second was a family living in Frankel Estate in September 2004, and it lasted for six months. Barokah's third employer was a resident of a condominium in the eastern part of Singapore in March 2005, but it also lasted for a few months. At one point, in 2003, Barokah also worked for a family in Malaysia for one year.

On 20 September 2005, Barokah was hired by Wee Keng Wah, who was her fourth employer in Singapore. Wee hired Barokah to take care of her husband Lee Tang Seng, who suffered from multiple health problems, like Parkinson's disease, weak limbs, severely impaired hearing, diabetes, hypertension and ischaemic heart disease.

== Account of the murder ==
The following was the official version of the murder of Wee Keng Wah, based on Barokah's confession and other evidence related to the crime.

During the early morning hours of 19 October 2005, Barokah sneaked out of the flat to meet up with her Bangladeshi boyfriend Ali. After the meeting, Barokah returned to the flat. However, she was caught red-handed by Wee Keng Wah, who discovered her absence from the flat prior to Barokah's return. Angered by Barokah's actions, Wee harshly scolded Barokah and threatened to fire her and send her back to Indonesia. In defiance, Barokah challenged the older woman to send her back to Indonesia. The commotion grew heated and it escalated into a fight between Wee and Barokah.

Not knowing that his wife and maid were having a fight, Wee's husband Lee Tang Seng overheard the commotion and he rushed to the bedroom of Wee. By then, Barokah had overpowered Wee, who fell unconscious but was still breathing and alive at the end of the fight. When Lee probed Barokah on what happened, Barokah feigned ignorance and claimed she had no idea what happened to Wee (whom she lied might have fell down), and even slapped her employer's face to try to revive her. After Lee left the flat to seek help from one of his neighbours Richard Chew Jhing Liang, Barokah pretended to go out with Wee's husband but she returned to the flat, and carried Wee's body on the bed first before she took it to the elderly woman's bedroom window, and threw the unconscious Wee out of the window. As a result, 75-year-old Wee Keng Wah died after falling nine storeys to the ground. Prior to the fall, Barokah had strangled Wee before throwing her off.

After Lee returned to the flat with Richard Chew, Barokah claimed that Wee was not inside the flat, and she even said that Wee must have gone out for morning exercise like she usually did. Later, Wee's youngest son Lee Seng Lim (李成林 Lǐ Chénglín), his wife Lim Yock Hoon and their two sons also arrived at the flat after his father called him, and they also searched for Wee. Similarly, when she was probed by Lee Seng Lim about his mother's whereabouts, Barokah feigned ignorance and said she did not know, and also stated Wee might have gone out for morning exercise. After Wee's body was discovered later that morning, Barokah was brought in for questioning due to the police suspecting her in light of her numerous inconsistencies in her account, which led to her arrest.

== Trial of Barokah ==
In July 2006, Barokah's case was transferred to the High Court, where she was set to stand trial for killing her employer Wee Keng Wah.

Before the start of her trial, Barokah's murder charge was reduced to a lesser offence of culpable homicide not amounting to murder, also known as manslaughter in Singapore's legal terms, and the reduction of the charge allowed Barokah to no longer face the death penalty for murdering Wee. The stipulated penalty for manslaughter was either life imprisonment or up to ten years in prison, in addition to possible caning or a fine. According to Dr Tommy Tan, a government psychiatrist, Barokah suffered from both depression and a dependent personality disorder that draws her to men, and the combination of these disorders were sufficient to impair her mental responsibility at the time of the murder. Therefore, Barokah's murder charge was reduced on the grounds of diminished responsibility. The defence's psychiatric expert Dr R Nagulendran, a psychiatrist in private practice, similarly diagnosed Barokah with both dependent personality disorder and depression.

On 26 November 2007, Barokah, who was represented by Senior Counsel Harpreet Singh Nehal (plus Kelly Fan and Wendell Wong), pleaded guilty to the reduced charge at the High Court, and her sentencing was carried out that same day. The trial judge, Justice Tay Yong Kwang, gave his full grounds of decision on 11 February 2008 to explain his verdict on sentence, finding that the victim concerned in the present case was a vulnerable person with an advanced age of 75 and also defenceless during the maid's attack on her. Justice Tay also explained that while the fight between Wee and Barokah was spontaneous and unpremeditated, and there was no prior intention on Barokah's part to cause death, he nevertheless found that there was a huge time lapse between the first assault and Barokah's subsequent decision to push the unconscious and helpless Wee down from the ninth storey, and she would have had time to recover and reflect on the incident after Wee was rendered unconscious from the fight. This lethal decision made Justice Tay conclude that Barokah was a dangerous and cold-blooded killer, and even with her depression, she was still able to fully understand right and wrong and also had a collected thought process since she took steps to deny her involvement.

Aside from this, Justice Tay pointed out that Barokah had betrayed the trust reposed in her as the caregiver of Wee's home by killing Wee in cold blood at the sanctity of Wee's home, and there was a need for deterrence in sentencing maids for committing offences against their employers to uphold the domestic worker-employer relationship, as is the case of employers who abused their maids. Justice Tay also took note that Barokah did not have strong familial support, since her husband spent most of his time working in Malaysia and would likely do so in the future as well, and the family income of Barokah was quite low, which may further add to her husband's need to work overseas. While her prognosis was relatively good and she could still recover with treatment, Barokah was likely to suffer a relapse, and in view of her dependent personality disorder and history of having affairs with other men and becoming guilty each time it happened, it was likely that a reoccurrence of such a matter might exacerbate her depression, and her mental disorders also signaled the high possibility of re-offending should similar situations of "push comes to shove" happen to Barokah, as demonstrated by the manner of the killing and her reaction to Wee's berate on the date of the killing.

Therefore, in summary of these above factors, Justice Tay found that the aggravated nature of Wee's manslaughter had sufficiently called for the higher tier of punishment allowed for manslaughter under the law. As such, 28-year-old Barokah was sentenced to life imprisonment, the maximum penalty for manslaughter in Singapore. As Barokah was a female, she was not sentenced to caning. Justice Tay additionally ordered her life term to commence from the date of her arrest on 19 October 2005.

In accordance with the landmark ruling of Abdul Nasir Amer Hamsah's appeal on 20 August 1997, an offender sentenced to life imprisonment must remain behind bars for the rest of his or her natural life. Previously, before the landmark ruling, a life sentence in Singapore was construed as a jail term of 20 years. The legal change was applicable to offences that were committed after 20 August 1997. Since the manslaughter of Wee Keng Wah was committed on 19 October 2005, eight years and two months after the legal reform, Barokah was to be imprisoned for the remainder of her whole life under her life sentence with pursuant to the amended law.

== Barokah's first appeal ==
After her sentencing, Barokah filed an appeal against her sentence. Her defence counsel applied to the Court of Appeal for leave to adduce a further report to determine whether Barokah's pregnancy (which was not detected during her remand) had a substantial impact on her mental responsibility at the material time, and they also submitted new psychiatric evidence to support their other points of appeal.

On 20 August 2008, the Court of Appeal meted out their judgement. They ordered the case to be remitted back to the High Court for a re-trial with respect to Barokah's sentence, and ordered the trial judge to re-evaluate the psychiatric evidence and decide on whether to impose a life sentence or a jail term of ten years or less for Barokah's conviction, which the Court of Appeal upheld.

== Re-trial of Barokah ==
The re-trial of Barokah was held between 16 and 19 February 2009, with the original trial judge Tay Yong Kwang presiding over the proceedings at the High Court. The psychiatrists Tommy Tan and R Nagulendran summoned in court to testify about Barokah's mental state, which also included their differing opinions on whether Barokah's pregnancy had a substantial bearing on her mental state. Dr Tan, who appeared for the prosecution, testified that during his interviews with Barokah, there was no observation that she was aware of her pregnancy and he also cited medical evidence that showed no correlation between pregnancy and mental impairment, and it could not have been a stressor of her depression, although Dr Nagulendran disagreed with Dr Tan's testimony when he appeared to testify for the defence.

Lee Seng Lim, the youngest son of Wee, also appeared as a witness in the re-trial, and he told the court that the relationship between his parents and Barokah was good and he also noticed the maid repeatedly giving answers that she did not know when he arrived at the flat and asked her repeatedly about his mother on the date of her death. On the stand, Lee reportedly broke down and he wanted a fair answer for his mother's death. Other witnesses include Wee's neighbour Richard Wee and two police officers - SSGT Mohamad Kamil bin Hassan and SGT Nor Hida binte Nasib - who first arrived at the scene, and they all testified that Barokah had a calm and collected demeanor when they asked her about Wee's whereabouts. Additionally, the police officers testified that when they informed Barokah of Wee's death, she appeared shocked and sad but never cried.

Aside from the defence's mitigation plea to impose a sentence lower than life, the embassy of Indonesia to Singapore also pledged to ensure that Barokah would adhere to her treatment once she was released and repatriated to Indonesia, and asked for leniency from the courts. Barokah's 31-year-old husband Isnaini Mislani also stated he was willing to take care of the daughter his wife bore with Ali, and also forgave her for her infidelity. The girl was entrusted to her grandparents by Barokah, who took care of her for 20 months while in prison.

On 26 February 2009, three days after closing submissions were made, Justice Tay Yong Kwang delivered his re-trial verdict and re-instated the life sentence he first imposed on Barokah back in 2007. In his judgement, Justice Tay disagreed that Barokah's mental state was affected by her pregnancy. He found that regardless of whether Barokah was suffering from diminished responsibility or not, she was still an inherent menace to society, even though she did not possess a high possibility to commit another offence. He also found that Barokah still had the propensity to become involved in extra-marital relationships and feeling guilty and depressed about it, and as a result of her psychiatric condition, her employer Wee Keng Wah died an unjust and brutal death, and such a "devastating" consequence only corroborated the fact that Barokah was a cold-blooded and dangerous killer. He also stated that the witnesses' testimonies of Barokah's calm demeanor in the aftermath of the killing also supported his observation that she had a collected state of mind.

Justice Tay ruled that the killing of Wee, which arose from the matter of Barokah sneaking out, was "cruel and inhumane" and it was totally unjustified in light of the circumstances. Justice Tay also determined that Barokah had a "brittle, volatile and violent temperament", and her depression was caused by her own decision to repeatedly engage in illicit affairs with other men and there were no encouraging signs that Barokah could change. On these grounds, Justice Tay was convinced that a strong signal for retribution was needed when imposing the most appropriate punishment in Barokah's case. The judge also stated that while sympathy could be given to the defendants, justice must also be prioritized and cannot be solely about the defendants, and in his own words, he quoted:

Justice is also about the victims and their families and the good of society at large. While we are concerned about the future of accused persons and their families, we must never forget the victims and their families. The victim in this case has no voice but the court's and has no future to even think about as a result of the crime.

In conclusion, Justice Tay decided that the appropriate punishment he could impose in the case of Barokah would be none other than life imprisonment, and he found no need to depart from his original decision back in 2007.

Wee's youngest son Lee Seng Lim, who was present in court to hear the judgement, told the press that while the sentence could not bring back his mother, he nonetheless hoped that the case can be closed for good in the future and he and his family wanted to move on, and he was still struggling with grief over the loss of his mother.

== Barokah's second appeal ==
After her life sentence was reinstated by the High Court, Barokah filed a second appeal to the Court of Appeal against the re-trial verdict.

On 20 August 2009, in spite of the defence's plea to reduce Barokah's sentence on the grounds that the killing was unpremeditated, her mental condition had a bearing on her actions and she did not pose as a risk to society, the Court of Appeal elected to dismiss the appeal. One of the appellate judges, Justice V K Rajah, told Singh that they acknowledged Barokah's psychiatric condition, but this was not an excuse to reduce her culpability and her psychiatric condition had already been duly considered, and it was sufficient to spare her from the murder charge, which would have warranted her a death sentence should she be convicted of murder. Overall, the appellate court affirmed the ruling of the trial judge Tay Yong Kwang and therefore upheld the life sentence imposed on Barokah.

== Aftermath ==
The case of Wee Keng Wah's death was one of the high-profile cases of maids killing their employers and/or the family member(s) of their employers in Singapore during the 2010s. Nearly all of the maids in these cases were, like Barokah, spared the gallows and convicted of manslaughter due to either diminished responsibility, sudden and grave provocation or other factors.

In July 2012, Senior Counsel Harpreet Singh Nehal, Barokah's former lawyer, spoke about the case of Barokah, which he regarded as one of the memorable cases he took pro bono as a lawyer. He encouraged lawyers to continue providing pro bono services to those in need, stating that it could help bring about a difference to the lives of those who need help. Singh also stated that whenever he visited Barokah in prison, he would often get to see her daughter, whom he described as a beautiful girl, and he felt saddened that Barokah would be separated from her daughter permanently since she would be serving a life sentence in another country away from Indonesia, and it also sent Singh an equal reminder that the victim Wee Keng Wah's bereaved family had to deal with their permanent loss as well.

Barokah is currently serving her life sentence at Changi Women's Prison since 19 October 2005. If Barokah serves with good behaviour while in jail, she will become eligible to be released on parole after completing at least 20 years of her sentence.

== See also ==
- Zin Mar Nwe case
- Murder of Nancy Gan
- Sundarti Supriyanto
- Purwanti Parji case
- Murder of Esther Ang
- Murder of Seow Kim Choo
- Life imprisonment in Singapore
- List of major crimes in Singapore
