= Murder of Nancy Gan =

2014 case of a socialite murdered by her maid in Singapore

Nancy Gan Wan Geok
- Nancy Gan Wan Geok, who died from fatal head injuries and drowning
- Born: Nancy Gan Wan Geok; 27 February 1945; Japanese-occupied Hong Kong
- Died: 19 March 2014 (aged 69); Bukit Timah, Singapore
- Cause of death: Drowning and fatal head injuries
- Occupations: Socialite; Pianist; Philanthropist; Porcelain painter
- Known for: Murder victim
- Spouse(s): Mr. Lim (m. unknown, died unknown); Hilton Cheong-Leen (m. 1988, d. unknown)
- Children: 2

On 19 March 2014, at her bungalow in Bukit Timah, 69-year-old Nancy Gan Wan Geok (颜婉玉 Yán Wǎnyù) was murdered by her newly hired maid, an 18-year-old Indonesian named Dewi Sukowati, who slammed Gan's head against a wall before throwing her body into a swimming pool of Gan's house, resulting in Gan's death from a brain injury and drowning. Gan, a socialite, had allegedly abused Dewi and it resulted in Dewi killing her in retaliation. Dewi was arrested and charged with murder, but after she was assessed to be suffering from diminished responsibility at the time of the offence, Dewi's murder charge was reduced to manslaughter before her trial started. Dewi pleaded guilty to the reduced charge and was sentenced to 18 years' imprisonment on 31 May 2016.

== Murder ==
On 19 March 2014, inside her bungalow at Victoria Park, Bukit Timah, an elderly woman was found dead in her swimming pool and with head injuries. On that same day itself, the woman's newly hired maid, an 18-year-old Indonesian citizen, was arrested on suspicion for murdering her employer. The maid was reportedly hired less than a week prior to the murder of Gan.

The victim was later identified as 69-year-old socialite Nancy Gan Wan Geok, a Hong Kong-born Singaporean who was the ex-wife of a Hong Kong politician. Gan herself was a porcelain painter and pianist who was known for her engagement in philanthropic activities and contributing her artworks to charity. At the time of her death, Gan left behind five sisters, two brothers and two children (aged in their 30s) from one of Gan's previous marriages. Gan's daughter Sharon Lim was living in London, where she worked as a doctor, while Gan's son Victor Lim lived together with her in Singapore. Gan's son was on a business trip in Seoul, South Korea at the time of his mother's murder, and he rushed back to Singapore after receiving news of his mother's death.

Forensic pathologist Dr Wee Keng Poh later conducted an autopsy on the victim. He found that Gan sustained a fractured skull that led to head injuries which were sufficient in the ordinary course of nature to cause death. Dr Wee also stated that the drowning itself had also primarily contributed to her death, and hence concluded the cause of death to be both drowning and the fatal head injuries Gan sustained. Although the crime scene itself was clean, forensic experts were able to use forensic technology to reveal the bloodstains that had been reportedly washed by the maid, including a trail of blood that started from the bedroom of the victim to the swimming pool, suggesting that Gan was dragged to the pool after she was allegedly killed in her bedroom.

Three days later, a funeral was held at Mount Vernon Sanctuary funeral home on 22 March 2014, with Gan's friends and family members attending the funeral itself before her cremation a day later. Gan's family were reportedly still in shock over what happened, and Gan's second sister Helen Gan remembered the victim as "a generous person, very giving, very affectionate". None of the political figures or dignitaries from Gan's social circle were invited out of consideration to keep the wake private. Gan's second ex-husband Hilton Cheong-Leen, a former Hong Kong politician, was also present at the funeral. Gan's stepdaughter Flora Cheong-Leen told a newspaper that although she was not close to her stepmother, she was saddened to learn about Gan's murder. Gan's family members, however, stated that they had never met her maid, who was charged with her murder two days before the funeral.

The murder of Nancy Gan was the second case of a maid killing her employer or the employer's family member(s) during that month itself. Earlier this month, a 24-year-old Myanmar maid Than Than Win was arrested for murdering her employer's 87-year-old mother-in-law Yong Wan Lan. Than was later found guilty of manslaughter and jailed for 13 years in July 2015.

== Investigations ==
On 20 March 2014, a day after Nancy Gan was murdered, her new maid, identified as 18-year-old Dewi Sukowati, was officially charged with murder in the Subordinate Courts of Singapore. Under the law, offenders convicted of murder could face the death penalty. Mohamed Muzammil bin Mohamed, a veteran lawyer who formerly represented several maids charged with murder (including Sundarti Supriyanto who killed her abusive employer), was engaged by the Indonesian embassy to defend Dewi during her upcoming murder trial. Dewi was also ordered to undergo psychiatric remand at Changi Women's Prison for three weeks. Her parents were also summoned to provide assistance in investigations.

During the course of investigations however, it was discovered that Dewi was possibly not 23 years old at the time of the murder, and her lawyer also requested to the court to amend her age. It was first reported by the Indonesian media that Dewi's registered date of birth on her passport, which was 5 August 1990, was likely to be false, and for this issue, Dewi's father was summoned to Singapore to assist in investigations regarding this matter and the Indonesian authorities also conducted a probe on the individuals who took part in the falsification of Dewi's age. Eventually, the authorities verified that Dewi's actual age was 18 years and seven months old at the time of the offence and her actual date of birth was 5 August 1995. Given her true age was 18 at the time of the murder, Dewi could still be sentenced to death if she was found guilty of murder, because the laws of Singapore allowed the courts to impose a death sentence for offenders aged 18 and above at the time of the offence, should such convicts be found guilty of whichever crime warrants capital punishment. On the other hand, criminals aged below 18 at the time of the offence would be spared the gallows and instead sentenced to life imprisonment if they were found guilty of murder.

On 21 April 2015, Dewi's murder charge was reduced to a lesser offence of culpable homicide not amounting to murder, also known as manslaughter in Singapore's legal terms, and the reduction of the charge allowed Dewi to no longer face the death penalty for murdering Gan. The possible punishment Dewi would face for manslaughter is either life imprisonment or up to 20 years' jail.

According to Dr Kenneth Koh, a psychiatrist from the Institute of Mental Health, he found that Dewi was suffering from "acute stress reaction", a psychological disorder resulting from exposure to trauma. According to Dr Koh, Dewi's condition, coupled by social factors such as her young age and her past experiences of abuse by her father, had significantly impaired her judgment, impulse control and mental responsibility at the time of the murder. Therefore, Dewi's murder charge was reduced on the grounds of diminished responsibility.

== Background ==
=== Nancy Gan Wan Geok ===
Nancy Gan Wan Geok was born in Hong Kong on 27 February 1945, and she spent her childhood growing up in Singapore. Gan was the oldest of eight children, and her father was a commander. Gan studied overseas at one point during her schooling years, and she graduated from Trinity College London, and became a classical pianist. Gan also became a porcelain painter after she first picked up the craft in 1974. Gan had held exhibitions of her porcelain paintings in Hong Kong from 1988 to 1992, and she also held such events in other countries like Singapore, the United States and Australia.

When she reached adulthood, Gan was married to a Malaysian surgeon (surnamed Lim) and had two children (one son and one daughter), but shortly after the birth of their son, Gan's first husband died. Afterwards, Gan married a second time to Hong Kong politician Hilton Cheong-Leen in 1988, and had four stepchildren from Cheong-Leen's first marriage (including Flora Cheong-Leen). Gan and Cheong-Leen later divorced on an unknown date.

After her divorce, Gan returned to Singapore and settled there up until her death. Gan would continue to paint landscapes, flora and fauna on porcelain and regularly donate her artworks to charity, and also devoted much of her time to philanthropic activities in Singapore and the Far East. Gan herself also participated in fund-raising activities for the Singapore Association of the Visually Handicapped, Singapore Cancer Society and the Bone Marrow Donor Programme. Gan was described by her kin and friends to be gregarious, neat in appearance and talented, and she was known for her kind-hearted and well-mannered character.

=== Dewi Sukowati ===
Dewi Sukowati
- 2014 police mugshot of Dewi Sukowati, who was charged with killing her employer
- Born: Dewi Sukowati; 5 August 1995 (age 31); Semarang, Central Java, Indonesia
- Other name: Dewi Suko Wati
- Occupations: Domestic maid (Singapore; former)
- Parents: Sukilan (father); Sutriswati (mother)
- Status: Imprisoned at Changi Women's Prison since 19 March 2014
- Conviction: Manslaughter (one count)
- Criminal charge: Murder
- Penalty: 18 years' imprisonment

Born on 5 August 1995, Dewi Sukowati was the eldest of three daughters in her family, who all came from Pati, a village in Central Java, Indonesia. She reportedly had a bad relationship with her father, who constantly abused her. Her sisters were aged 17 and four respectively at the time she was tried for killing Nancy Gan.

Dewi studied up to her third year in secondary school, and due to her family's poverty, Dewi was sent to work as a maid. However, she did not go through the normal procedure of having a three-month mandatory training as a maid. Instead, Dewi underwent a one-day crash course of training as a maid and was therefore sent off to Singapore for employment despite being ill-equipped. Not only that, although Dewi was 18 years old and had not attained the legal minimum age of 23 to work as a maid in Singapore, her date of birth was changed to 5 August 1990 to make her five years older than her real age, enabling her to bypass the legal requirements. She was hired by Nancy Gan and her first day of work at Gan's household was on 13 March 2014. However, for the first six days of her work, Dewi was allegedly receiving verbal and physical abuse from Gan, due to Dewi not performing up to her expectations as a maid. On the first day, Dewi was reportedly poked on the head by Gan, who also used a broomstick to hit her on her head.

== Account of the murder ==
The following was the official version of the murder of Nancy Gan, based on the confession of Dewi Sukowati and other evidence gathered by the authorities.

On 19 March 2014, the sixth day of Dewi's job at Gan's house, Dewi woke up at 5.30am to start her work for the day itself. Two hours later, Dewi was tasked by Gan to bring her a glass of water. However, after doing so, Gan splashed the water on Dewi's face and threw the tray onto the floor, as the maid was using the wrong type of tray for the glass of water, and that was not the first time she made the same mistake. Dewi tried picking it up but Gan grabbed it first and hit Dewi on the head, and after scolding Dewi, Gan threatened that she would cut down Dewi's monthly salary to S$200 a month.

According to Dewi, after she endured six days of alleged abuse and upon hearing the threat of getting her pay cut, it became the proverbial straw that broke the camel's back and Dewi finally lost her cool. Dewi grabbed hold of Gan's hair and hands and swung her employer's head against the wall. Dewi stated that she originally meant to slam Gan's face against the wall, but instead, Gan was hit on the back of her head against the wall because she resisted in the course of the scuffle. This led to fractures of her skull and Gan fell unconscious after getting hit. Dewi was greatly panicked at the sight of massive bleeding from Gan's wound and it took her ten minutes before Dewi checked to see if Gan had died. After feeling a weak heartbeat from Gan's chest, Dewi decided to place Gan's body in the swimming pool of the house in order to drown her and make it look like Gan committed suicide, and she did so out of fear that Gan might wake up and call the police. During the process of dragging Gan's body to the pool, Dewi was reminded of the resentment and anger she harboured towards Gan for the alleged mistreatment and hence she slammed Gan's head against the edge of a ceramic-tiled staircase step. After placing the body in the pool, Dewi also threw her employer's sandals into the pool to further create the false impression of a suicide.

After she threw Gan's corpse into the swimming pool, Dewi rushed back into the house to clean it and remove the bloodstains. She first cleaned away the trail of blood from the deceased's bedroom to the swimming pool by mopping the floor multiple times, and disposed of the bloodstained items from Gan's bungalow. Dewi also changed into a fresh set of clothes because her own clothes were stained with the blood of her employer, and she soaked her blood-stained clothing in a pail inside her room's toilet to remove the bloodstains.

Once she finished cleaning the house, Dewi went outside to a neighbour's house to seek help, and later, she managed to approach a dispatch driver named Mohammad Hasri bin Abdul Hamid, and told him that her employer was in the swimming pool and she needed help. Mohammad Hasri entered the house with Dewi and after seeing Gan's body in the pool, he called the police and it thus led to the arrest of Dewi as a result.

== Trial of Dewi Sukowati ==
Less than a year after the reduction of her murder charge, Dewi Sukowati was originally scheduled to stand trial at the High Court on 5 January 2016 for manslaughter, but due to the prosecution requiring more time to study the mitigation plea from the defence, the trial was delayed until a later date. Eventually, four months later, on 31 May 2016, Dewi officially stood trial at the High Court, where she pleaded guilty to manslaughter. The trial was presided by Judicial Commissioner Foo Chee Hock of the High Court.

The prosecution, led by Deputy Public Prosecutors Chee Min Ping and James Low, sought the second-highest sentence of 20 years' imprisonment for Dewi, stating that even though she suffered from diminished responsibility at the material time, Dewi nonetheless initiated a “brutal” and “deliberate” attack on a vulnerable victim, and her mental condition was not severe enough to prevent her from realising the gravity and consequences of her actions, and there was no justification for Dewi to take a life even in such a situation where she had to deal with an abusive employer. On the other hand, Dewi's lawyer Mohamed Muzammil Mohamed argued in mitigation that Dewi should be given a lower jail term of between ten and 12 years, citing that Dewi had undergone abuse from Gan and she did not receive sufficient training before her employment and hence was inexperienced in her line of work and she was incapable of adjusting to life in a foreign country, and thus asked for leniency in her case. Mohamed also submitted an affidavit containing the testimony of Nurul Putri Mildanti, an Indonesian maid who used to work at Gan's house in 2013, who also stated that she was regularly scolded and hit by Gan whenever she did not perform up to expectations, although the judge would later reject this affidavit due to it not being admissible.

On the same date of Dewi's conviction, Judicial Commissioner Foo delivered his verdict. On one hand, he accepted that Dewi was suffering from diminished responsibility at the material time, and he also accepted other factors such as Dr Koh's contention that Dewi could still recover with appropriate treatment and had a low risk of re-offending, her young age, her personal circumstances, the abuse and provocation issued by Gan and the need for rehabilitation. On the other hand, however, Judicial Commissioner Foo directed his attention to the aggravating factors of the crime, stating that even though it was not disputed that Dewi was provoked into fracturing Gan's skull by slamming her head on the wall, Dewi's subsequent actions of throwing the unconscious Gan into the swimming pool to properly render her dead and attempt to cover up the crime as suicide demonstrated a high degree of calculation and premeditation. Judicial Commissioner Foo also found that in the face of the provocation given, Dewi had reacted grossly out of proportion and thus savagely and brutally inflicted the injuries on Gan, so much so that in the absence of drowning, Gan's head injuries alone were sufficient in the ordinary course of nature to cause death. Judicial Commissioner Foo also stated that by killing Gan in cold blood in the sanctity of Gan's home, Dewi betrayed the trust given her as the caregiver of Gan's home and hence, Judicial Commissioner Foo concluded that a harsh sentence was warranted for the purposes of deterrence and retribution.

Therefore, Judicial Commissioner Foo sentenced 20-year-old Dewi Sukowati to jail for 18 years, and ordered her jail term to commence from the date of her arrest on 19 March 2014.

== Dewi's appeal ==
In September 2016, Dewi Sukowati appealed against her jail term of 18 years, on the grounds that it was manifestly excessive. Mohamed Muzammil Mohamed continued to represent her in the appeal, while the prosecution was led by Mohamed Faizal Mohamed Abdul Kadir and Teo Lu Jia. Four months later, on 16 January 2017, Dewi's appeal against her sentence was dismissed by the Court of Appeal.

Delivering their ex tempore judgement, the appellate court's three judges - Chief Justice Sundaresh Menon and two Judges of Appeal Judith Prakash and Tay Yong Kwang - found that the 18-year sentence was not manifestly excessive in Dewi's case, even though they accepted the mitigating factors of Dewi's case, such as the low degree of premeditation, the provocation by Nancy Gan, Dewi's mental condition and her tender age of 18 at the time of the offence. Giving their reasons to uphold Dewi's sentence, the appellate judges found that after the first assault, Dewi's subsequent acts of throwing the unconscious victim into her swimming pool and covering up the death as suicide were demonstrative of her intention to silence Gan and avoid retribution from the authorities for having assaulted Gan, and based on the precedent cases of maids killing their employers or their employers' family member(s), the nature of Dewi's case was aggravated and brutal and it was comparable to the more serious cases where the maximum sentence of life in prison or 20 years in jail was imposed, and hence, they found no initiative to reduce Dewi's jail term, and thus dismissed her appeal for a lower sentence.

Currently, Dewi is incarcerated at Changi Women's Prison since March 2014. Should she maintain good behavior while in prison, Dewi would be released on parole in March 2026 after completing at least two-thirds of her sentence (equivalent to 12 years).

== Aftermath ==
In the aftermath of the case, in light of the increasing number of underaged maids gaining employment in Singapore by falsifying their ages, the Ministry of Manpower began introducing measures to clamp down on those who were responsible for the breaches of the minimum age requirement of foreign maids. In 2018, an employment agency proprietor Khor Siew Tiang, a 35-year-old Singapore permanent resident, was arrested for attempting to send a 13-year-old girl from Myanmar into Singapore as a domestic maid, and she faced either a fine or a jail term not exceeding six months for this offence, and the girl was barred from seeking employment in Singapore in the future. Khor was eventually fined S$5,000 after she pleaded guilty in court that same year.

The Indonesian government also paid more attention to the plight of their citizens who worked as maids in Singapore and other countries as a result of both the Nancy Gan murder case and the Erwiana Sulistyaningsih maid abuse case from Hong Kong, which highlighted the abuse and poor working conditions which Indonesian maids had faced in other countries. Therefore, the Indonesian government also sought to discuss with the host countries to improve the working conditions of maids who originated from Indonesia.

== See also ==
- Sundarti Supriyanto
- Purwanti Parji case
- Murder of Esther Ang
- Murder of Seow Kim Choo
- Zin Mar Nwe case
- List of major crimes in Singapore
