= Murder of Esther Ang =

2003 murder of a purchasing officer in Singapore

Esther Ang Imm Suan
- Esther Ang, who was strangled to death
- Born: 1957; Colony of Singapore
- Died: 2 March 2004 (aged 47); Loyang Avenue, Singapore
- Cause of death: Murdered
- Occupation: Purchasing officer
- Employer: Unnamed oil-rig company
- Known for: Murder victim

On 2 March 2004, 47-year-old Esther Ang Imm Suan (洪阴钻 Hóng Yīnzuàn) was murdered by her two Indonesian maids, Siti Aminah and Juminem, who also stole her jewellery and money from her house. It was alleged that Ang had been harsh in her scolding of the maids and expectations of her maids' performance and it caused them both to resort to violence and therefore committed the killing. Both Juminem and Siti were charged with murder, a crime which warrants the death penalty under Singaporean law.

During the trial, it was revealed that both the maids were suffering from different types of depression that affected their mental faculties at the time of the offence. After a 19-day trial, on 5 September 2005, both Siti and Juminem were found guilty of lesser charges of manslaughter, and Siti was sentenced to ten years in prison while Juminem was sentenced to the maximum penalty of life imprisonment.

== Murder ==
On 2 March 2004, a 47-year-old woman was discovered dead on her bed by her ex-husband at Carissa Park Condominium in Loyang Avenue.

The victim was identified as Esther Ang Imm Suan, and she was a purchasing officer employed at an oil-rig company. She was found with bruises and injuries concentrated at her neck, abdomen and limbs. According to a forensic report, the cause of death was strangulation, and the bruises on the chest suggested that she was pinned down or that her assailant(s) sat onto her chest to strangle her, and five ribs were broken as a result.

Soon after, the police managed to arrest two suspects, who were both Indonesian maids, and one of them was working at Ang's condominium. Both the maids confessed that they indeed murdered Ang. Several of Ang's jewelry and money were found in the possession of one of the maids, and a S$25,000 cheque bearing a signature of Ang (forged by the other maid) was also recovered.

On 4 March 2004, the two Indonesian maids - 18-year-old Juminem and 15-year-old Siti Aminah - were both charged with murder; Siti's official age of 18 on her passport was found to be forged and she was actually 15. Under the Penal Code, the death penalty was mandatory for offenders convicted of murder, but in the case of Siti, who was below 18 at the time, she was not eligible for the death sentence and would instead be imprisoned indefinitely under the President's Pleasure if she was found guilty of murder.

== Background ==
Esther Ang Imm Suan, born in 1957, was married twice with three children and both her marriages ended with a divorce. She had one daughter from her first marriage with a man surnamed Lim, while she had two sons with her second ex-husband Jack Boon. Even after her second divorce, Ang remained on good terms with Boon, who was granted care and control of their sons, both of whom lived with their father and grandmother in Pasir Ris. Ang herself lived alone at Carissa Park condominium, and at the time of her death, she worked as a purchasing officer in an oil-rig company. Boon was the person who discovered Ang's corpse after she was killed.

Born on 12 April 1985, Juminem (who goes by one name) was the youngest of seven children from her family, who all lived in Margomulo, a village in Lampung, Sumatra. Juminem's parents were padi farmers, and Juminem would often help them in their farming work during her school holidays. Juminem was said to be the brightest child of her family, and she was the only one out of seven children to complete Senior High School. To alleviate her parents' financial situation, Juminem went to Singapore to work. She was first employed as a maid in Ang's household on 2 September 2003.

Siti Aminah, who was born on 5 April 1988, was the only child of her parents. She hailed from East Timor, Java. Siti was not an academically-inclined student back in school, and her school report cards showed she was ranked close to the bottom of her class. Although she was only 15, Siti falsely declared her age and claimed to be older, which enabled her to enter Singapore to work. She was first employed as a maid in Jack Boon's household on 2 October 2003, and on a regular basis, Siti would go to Ang's condominium to do the household chores, and it was where she befriended Juminem. Both Siti and Juminem became close, and Siti viewed Juminem as an older sister. Both of them would often spoke to each other about their personal issues and feelings.

== Trial and sentencing ==
=== Proceedings ===
Juminem, the mastermind of the murder

Siti Aminah, Juminem's friend and accomplice

The trial of both Juminem and Siti Aminah began at the High Court on 28 March 2005. Senior Counsel Jimmy Yim represented Juminem, while Senior Counsel Alvin Yeo represented Siti. The prosecution was led by Amarjit Singh, David Khoo and Jason Chan. The trial judge was Choo Han Teck. The trial itself marked the first time that two senior counsels have been assigned to defend suspects charged with murder. It was also extensively covered by the Indonesian media, and representatives of the Indonesian embassy in Singapore also attended the trial to provide support for the pair, and they reportedly expressed their faith in the fairness and impartiality of the Singaporean judicial system.

The prosecution's case was that the maids committed the crime out of vengeance and greed. They cited the evidence that the maids stole from Esther Ang after killing her in her sleep, and also referred to the statements of the maids, who both stated that Ang had often been harsh in her scoldings and expectations of their work performance (especially Juminem), which led to the maids perceived they were abused by Ang and thus planned the killing a week ahead before they executed the plot. On these grounds, the prosecution sought a conviction of murder for both Juminem and Siti Aminah.

On the other hand, both Siti and Juminem denied that they did the killing for the purpose of robbery. The defence counsels of Siti and Juminem argued that the maids indeed suffered from alleged abuse under Ang's supervision, and because their main defence for each maid was diminished responsibility, their version of events was that Juminem felt depressed and dissatisfied with her work under Ang, in addition to Ang having owed her about S$300 (Ang reportedly had a gambling habit), and thus wanted to get back at Ang, and roped in Siti to help her after suggesting it to Siti, who agreed to tag along out of sympathy for her older friend (after she failed to persuade Juminem to cancel the plan). After killing Ang by hitting her abdomen with a wine bottle and strangling her, they decided to steal money and other valuables from Ang's home to make it look like a robbery took place, and it was not out of greed. The defence also sought to reduce their clients' murder charges to manslaughter on the grounds of diminished responsibility.

=== Psychiatric evidence ===
As a further corroboration of their defense of diminished responsibility, three medical experts were called to testify for Siti and Juminem.

Dr Douglas Kong Sim Guan, a psychiatrist who assessed Juminem, was the first to present his evidence. He found that Juminem suffered from reactive depression of moderate severity, and it substantially impaired her mental responsibility. Dr Kong stated that based on Juminem's diary entries, he noted that her initial optimism towards her work was gradually marred by her strong sense of homesickness, loneliness and longing for her boyfriend and family, and her impression about her employer. Dr Kong also said that Juminem noticeably lost weight while she worked in Singapore, and had difficulty adjusting to a different environment from her home, as well as suffering from insomnia and her low self-esteem from Ang's frequent criticisms of her work performance, he determined these above factors as the symptoms of her disorder and that it was exacerbated by Ang's scoldings and her financial woes. Additionally, the severity of Juminem’s condition was so much so that she herself was unable to differentiate between rationality and irrationality.

The remaining two medical experts, Dr Clare Ong Kwee Hiong and Dr Ung Eng Khean, testified for Siti in her defence. Dr Ong, a consultant psychologist, testified that Siti had low IQ, and as a result, she lacked the ability to think logically and had difficulty understanding the co-relations between given matters and actions. As for Dr Ung, a consultant psychiatrist, he testified that Siti suffered from a depressive disorder, and he referred to Siti's inability to adjust to a foreign environment and her lack of familial support in a foreign land, as well as her immaturity, inability to cope with stress, the huge financial burden she bore, and the frequent scoldings she received from Ang, it led to Siti having a depressed mood, weight loss, fatigue, difficulty in thinking and concentrating, and also feelings of worthlessness. Dr Ung said that Siti's low IQ and slow speed in learning also had a contributory link to her psychiatric state, and Siti was more likely to be led along by the older maid Juminem due to her sister-like relationship with Juminem, the influence Juminem had over her, and her sympathy with Juminem's plight, and these were the reasons why she joined Juminem in the plot of murdering Esther Ang.

In rebuttal, the prosecution called on two psychiatrists to rebut the defence's evidence. Dr Kenneth Koh, a consultant psychiatrist who assessed Juminem, said that he did not detect the symptoms from Juminem during his interactions with her. Dr Cai Yiming, a senior consultant psychiatrist who assessed Siti, similarly stated that she was not suffering from diminished responsibility. Although he conceded that Siti was just a follower in the crime, Dr Cai said it was unlikely that Siti's mental faculties were severely affected to the extent of her losing her sense of judgement and self-control, and she was still considerably mentally sound at the time of the crime.

=== Verdict ===
On 5 September 2005, after a trial lasting 19 days, Justice Choo Han Teck delivered his verdict.

In his verdict, Justice Choo found that the two maids indeed suffered from diminished responsibility and that the defence's psychiatric evidence should be accepted over those of the prosecution. He stated that in the case of Juminem, Dr Kong's evidence was more objective and had a more complete assessment of Juminem's mental state, and while he did not deny Dr Koh's credentials as a psychiatrist, Justice Choo said Dr Koh never had access to Juminem's diary entries in order to further examine her mental condition, and therefore Dr Kong's evidence should be preferred over that of Dr Koh, and it was accepted that Juminem suffered from diminished responsibility at the time she killed Esther Ang.

In the case of Siti Aminah, Justice Choo determined that she was more likely to be led along by the older and adult-looking Juminem due to her pity for her friend and the influence Juminem had over Siti. He also agreed that Siti had low IQ and her psychiatric evidence of a depressive disorder were corroborated by the other sources of evidence, including her relationship with Ang and Jack Boon's mother (who also reprimanded her) and her school report cards, and Dr Ung's assessment of Siti based on her account and the above evidence was more complete than Dr Cai. Hence, Justice Choo was inclined to rule that Siti Aminah also suffered from diminished responsibility.

Aside from this, Justice Choo did not agree that Ang was a maid abuser, because there was no evidence of physical abuse suffered by the maids, and there was insufficient evidence to show that Ang's scoldings amounted to maid abuse, and she was at best, an employer who was hooked greatly to expecting a lot from her maids' work performance and strict with them and obsessed with perfection.

Nonetheless, based on his overall findings, Justice Choo found both Juminem and Siti Aminah not guilty of murder, and instead convicted them of a lesser offence of culpable homicide not amounting to murder, also known as manslaughter in Singapore's legal terms. The permissible punishment for manslaughter was either life imprisonment or up to ten years' imprisonment.

With respect to sentence, Justice Choo sentenced 20-year-old Juminem to the maximum sentence of life in prison, while at the same time, he sentenced 17-year-old Siti Aminah to ten years of imprisonment, and backdated their sentences to the date of their arrests. When coming to his decision on sentence, Justice Choo considered that Juminem was the mastermind and played a larger role than Siti, the premeditation behind the offence, and the youthfulness of Siti, and hence subjected Juminem to the heavier sentence of life while electing to order Siti to serve ten years behind bars.

Based on the landmark ruling of Abdul Nasir Amer Hamsah's appeal on 20 August 1997, an offender sentenced to life imprisonment must remain behind bars for the rest of his or her natural life. This was in contrast to the previous law where it decreed that a life term was equivalent to a fixed jail term of twenty years. The legal change was applicable to criminal cases that were committed after 20 August 1997. Since the killing of Esther Ang occurred on 2 March 2004, six years and seven months after the legal reform, Juminem, who received a life sentence for this case, was to be imprisoned for the remainder of her natural lifespan.

== Aftermath ==
The families of Siti Aminah and Juminem were present in court hearing the verdict. They were reportedly relieved that both Siti and Juminem were spared the gallows and they were given time to speak to the two defendants. Mochamad Slamet Hidayat, Indonesia's ambassador to Singapore, state he had mixed feelings towards the verdict since he expected a lighter sentence for Juminem, but he stood by his respect for the "fair and honest" judicial system of Singapore. Both Siti and Juminem stated they would not appeal their sentences and accepted their punishment. Likewise, the prosecution did not appeal against the trial ruling of both Juminem's and Siti's cases.

On the other hand, Esther Ang's family had a hard time coming to terms with the verdict, since they expected the older maid Juminem to be given the death penalty for murdering Ang. However, Ang's 22-year-old daughter Michelle Lim told the press that she was okay with the verdict, because she felt that a life sentence was more appropriate than a death sentence for Juminem, whom she said would live with the guilt of killing her mother for the rest of her life in prison. Ang's family was also glad that the court found Ang never abused her maids, and her daughter said that her mother tend to be obsessed with cleanliness and it may have caused her to scold the maids on some occasions. Ang's family members, including her former mother-in-law and second ex-husband, testified during the trial that Ang never abused her maids despite having scolded them a lot.

The murder of Esther Ang was one of the most shocking cases of maids killing their employers or their employer's family members that happened in the 2000s. Others include Sundarti Supriyanto, who was jailed for life for killing her cruel and abusive employer and the employer's daughter; and Purwanti Parji, who killed her employer's mother-in-law and given a life term for the horrific crime.

Siti Aminah was released from prison in 2014. Juminem remained in Changi Women's Prison serving her life sentence since March 2004, and her sentence carried the possibility of parole after completing a minimum period of twenty years in jail.

== See also ==
- Zin Mar Nwe case
- Sundarti Supriyanto
- Murder of Seow Kim Choo
- Life imprisonment in Singapore
- Capital punishment in Singapore
- List of major crimes in Singapore
