= Sundarti Supriyanto =

Former Indonesian maid who was jailed in Singapore for culpable homicide

- Born: c. 1979; East Java, Indonesia
- Status: Imprisoned since 10 June 2002; possibly released on parole after spending minimally 20 years in jail
- Conviction: Culpable homicide not amounting to murder (2 counts)
- Penalty: Life imprisonment (24 September 2004)

Details
- Victims: 2
- Date: 28 May 2002
- Country: Singapore
- Date apprehended: 10 June 2002

Sundarti Supriyanto (born 1979) is a former Indonesian maid who killed her employer and her employer’s daughter in Bukit Merah, Singapore. She was originally in line for the death penalty when she faced two charges of murder under section 300(c) of the Penal Code for the two deaths, which became known as the “Bukit Merah double murders” in Singapore.

Subsequently, Sundarti, who claimed to be abused by her late employer prior to the killings, was convicted of lesser charges of culpable homicide not amounting to murder and sentenced to life imprisonment in Singapore. Her case became known as one of the notable cases where maids had killed their employers or the employers’ kin, and her case was also a legal representative benchmark of the legal defence of “grave and sudden provocation” against murder in Singapore.

== Early life ==
Sundarti Supriyanto, the eldest of three children in her family, was born in Indonesia sometime in 1979. She grew up in the village of Mengge, Magetan Regency, East Java.

Sundarti’s family was financially poor since her childhood. It can be assumed that she did not receive much schooling and had to work to provide for her family. In an unspecified year, she was recruited by a maid training agency, who would train young Indonesian women in doing household chores like cooking and cleaning before allowing them to work as foreign domestic maids in other countries. Sundarti was said to have agreed to do it since her family needed money and lived a hard life. Sundarti also learnt to speak English through the agency’s training programme.

== Employment in Singapore ==
=== First-time employment in Singapore ===
After she completed her training in Jakarta, Sundarti was first offered a job as a domestic maid in Singapore, and her first employers were a Chinese couple with three children. Sundarti first set foot in Singapore in April 1999 and began working for the Chinese family. She had once stolen from the family but the agency did not do anything. After two years working on this job in Singapore, she returned to Indonesia.

=== Second employment in Singapore ===
In September 2001, after returning home from Singapore, Sundarti’s father died for unknown reasons. As a result, Sundarti decided to undergo further training to get a better-paying job in order to better assist her family financially during these difficult times. After completing further training, Sundarti returned to Singapore in April 2002 to accept a second work offer.

The second job offer came from 34-year-old Angie Ng Wee Peng, the wife of 44-year-old businessman Drake Poh Teong Kang, who made headlines in 1998 for his plans to open a casino and resort in Myanmar. The couple have two children - an elder daughter named Crystal Poh Shi Qi and a younger son named Leon Poh Ye Sheng - who were born in 1999 and 2000 respectively. After an interview, Ng decided to hire Sundarti on a trial basis, and she was to work in both Ng’s office in Bukit Merah and the Poh family’s flat.

== Bukit Merah double murders ==
On 28 May 2002, 22-year-old Sundarti Supriyanto killed her employer Angie Ng and Ng’s daughter Crystal Poh, due to her being harshly abused and starved by Ng to the point of losing control.

Prior to the incident, Sundarti had been experiencing both physical abuse and deprivation of food by Ng, who often would find fault in her and sometimes deprive her of food for days. Sundarti first realised this when she saw two other maids, known to her as Aminah and Jami, having their hairs pulled or got slapped for any small errors in their work. At one point, she saw Aminah being thrown out of the house for perceived mistakes in her work, leading to police coming to the doorstep. After both Aminah and Jami resigned from their jobs, Sundarti began to bear the full brunt of mistreatment.

Initially, Sundarti, whose main job was to prepare food for the family and care for Ng’s two children, would get to help herself to some biscuits or bread in the office or leftovers from the Poh family’s meals, but gradually, Ng told her she was dissatisfied with Sundarti’s work performance and disallowed Sundarti from touching the family’s leftover food. Also, whenever Drake Poh was not at home having meals or going overseas, Ng did not allow the maid to eat. She was also displeased with Sundarti asking for food from her or any of her employees from her office, and even told the employees to not give the maid any food. Still, Sundarti would continue to ask for food, and the employees of Ng’s office sympathized with her and thus would give her biscuits or bread whenever Ng was not there looking. Sundarti even said once that she was forced to eat the faeces of Ng’s children.

On the fateful day of 28 May 2002, at around morning in Ng’s flat, Sundarti was given two packets of instant noodles by Ng, who grudgingly did so after the maid incessantly told her about her hunger. However, Ng asked her to eat the noodles raw, and told her to eat in the kitchen toilet. Sundarti, who put the noodles and sauce in a plastic container filled with hot water, only got to eat a few bites before Ng took her to her Bukit Merah office. Over there, later in the afternoon, Ng again physically abused the maid over not properly caring for the children. This caused Sundarti to finally snap and angrily asked why did Ng have to cause hurt and humiliation to her daily. Ng, in response, scolded her and scratched the maid’s face in the face of her defiance. This sparked a fight between the women.

According to Sundarti, after grabbing ahold of a rope, she strangled Ng with the rope during the course of the fight, doing so with more strength than she initially did, as her thoughts about Ng’s sadistic behaviour and the humiliation she went through under Ng’s treatment made her angrier than ever. She stopped after Ng became limp, and as the maid was just about to stand up and try to calm the two children down, Ng suddenly kicked her on the leg and caused Sundarti to lose balance and fall. Ng then threw a kettle of boiling water at the maid and took a knife and tried to stab her. Sundarti, who was scalded by the hot water, was said to have carried Ng’s elder daughter Crystal Poh and used her as a human shield against the attacking Ng, who persisted using the knife to stab at Sundarti, and these blows allegedly landed on Crystal’s chest. After the little girl got stabbed, Sundarti somehow managed to overpower Ng and during the scuffle, inflicted several mortal blows onto Ng and finally killed her.

After the murders, Sundarti finally calmed down and she thought of using fire to get rid of the evidence, and wanted to commit suicide by burning herself due to her fear of getting arrested and facing capital punishment. This led to her having to go hire a taxi and go to buy petrol from a petrol station. She also bought two lighters from a woman smoking nearby the block and thus set alight the office after pouring petrol all over the office and its possessions.

Still, even though she was ready to leave herself to die, Sundarti decided to protect Leon (who was still alive at that time) from the fire and thus took him out of the burning office, where a few witnesses had gathered outside, and called an ambulance and firemen to put out the fire and bring the maid and boy to hospital.

Initially, in the hospital, to several witnesses and the police, Sundarti gave a false account that it was a group of black-clothed, masked men who went into the office and set fire in it, causing the fire to kill Ng and Crystal. It was only on 10 June 2002, when autopsy results showed stab wounds on Ng and her daughter, that the police decided to arrest Sundarti as a suspect and charge her with murder.

== Trial ==
=== Proceedings ===
On 18 August 2003, Sundarti Supriyanto first stood trial in the High Court of Singapore for the double murder charges relating to the deaths of Ng and Crystal. Sundarti was represented by Singaporean lawyer Mohamed Muzammil bin Mohamed, who was assisted by Johan Ismail. The prosecution was led by Deputy Public Prosecutor (DPP) Jaswant Singh, who was assisted by his three colleagues Eugene Lee, Aaron Lee and Adrian Yeo from the Attorney-General’s Chambers (AGC) of Singapore. Initially, the trial should start in April 2003 but due to the 2003 SARS outbreak in Singapore, it was postponed to August 2003.

In the court, after abandoning her initial account, Sundarti told the court on the stand about the extensive and severe maid abuse which Ng had inflicted on her over the month she worked for Ng’s family, and admitted she started the fire and said it was Ng who attacked her first. With regards to the fatal wounds found on Ng’s body however, Sundarti insisted that Ng stabbed herself after she allegedly threatened to hurt Leon should Ng not harm herself, but the autopsy results by Dr Gilbert Lau had proven that the twelve knife wounds were not self-inflicted and they were more probable to be inflicted by the maid.

Sundarti’s claims of abuse were corroborated by Ng’s employees Fiona Ong, Rose Ang, Esther Hong, Margaret Low and Nancy Ee, who testified that there were times where Ng indeed refused to give the maid any food and preventing them from giving any food to Sundarti, and their moves of sympathy to give Sundarti some snacks while Ng was not looking, as well as Ng scolding Sundarti for eating the baby’s food. Even the two previous maids of Ng, Aminah and Jami, also told the court that Ng had indeed physically abused them frequently even when they committed the slightest of mistakes in their work. Despite the above testimonies of Ng’s cruelty towards her maids, Ng’s husband Drake Poh and Ng’s family defended Ng and stated that Ng was not a maid abuser when they took the stand as prosecution witnesses.

In addition, the prosecution sought to portray Sundarti as a cold-blooded killer and an incorrigible liar, as they said she told the police, witnesses and court many different versions of what happened, arguing that these lies only served to corroborate her guilt and she was completely lying about the alleged maid abuse. They also said that the witnesses who arrived at the raging crime scene noted that Sundarti looked calm when they found her with the baby, which meant she did not have any loss of self-control at all. As such, they sought that Sundarti should be found guilty of murder and sentenced to death.

In response, Sundarti’s lawyer Mohamed Muzammil bin Mohamed argued that Sundarti was not to be held liable for murder given that the crime was committed in a moment of loss of self-control and due to sudden and grave provocation caused by Ng’s mistreatment of her maid. Mohamed also said that the killing was due to a sudden fight and his client was exercising her right to self-defence, given that she was physically a small-sized and frail young woman who was slightly larger than Ng and had no undue advantage over the victim, and she would have died or seriously injured had she not used the knife to confront Ng, who continually attacked the maid despite being injured. The fight that ensued by the quarrel and with no premeditation was in favour of Sundarti since Ng was the aggressor and it was not of a cruel and unusual nature.

The trial dragged on for more than a year, and it took 27 days to hear the case before the trial judge, High Court judge M P H Rubin would decide on his final verdict.

=== Verdict ===
On 24 September 2004, Justice Rubin was ready with his verdict in Sundarti’s case. In a packed courtroom, many people, including the victim’s family, prosecutors and Sundarti, were shocked and surprised as Justice Rubin read out that he decided to convict Sundarti of culpable homicide not amounting to murder after finding her not guilty of murder.

In his 70-page long judgement, Justice Rubin explained why he reduced the murder charges against Sundarti. He said that he was convinced that Sundarti was truthful about the allegations of maid abuse against Ng despite her many lies in her account, and rejected the prosecution’s attempts to impeach her allegations. Firstly, he stated that some of the prosecution witnesses, mainly Ng’s colleagues, had verified that they indeed saw Sundarti being refused any chances to eat and other instances where they, out of pity, gave the maid some snacks or Ng ordering her employees to not give her maid any food.

Not only that, he said that the police’s discovery of some leftover noodles and soup in the bathroom was also one significant aspect that cemented Sundarti’s claim that Ng forced her to enter the bathroom to eat after grudgingly giving her the raw noodles. While the judge conceded that no one directly witnessed Ng’s mistreatment of her maid, he laid out that such acts would often occur in the absence of inquisitive eyes, and probably more of such instances may have occurred. He nevertheless also rejected the allegations that Ng forced Sundarti to eat the children’s faeces as he found it too hard to believe. With regards to the prosecution’s attempts to completely discredit her account, Justice Rubin did not mince his words as he issued harsh and strongly-worded criticisms towards the prosecution for failing to take into consideration the plight of Sundarti and her account of what happened.

While he also found there was sufficient evidence to prove that Sundarti had intentionally inflicted the fatal injuries on Ng, Justice Rubin also found that the partial defence of grave and sudden provocation applied in Sundarti’s case. He stated that the abuse and humiliation that Ng deliberately caused on her maid daily had culminated into a huge frenzy that caused Sundarti to finally lose control of herself and attack Ng in the most violent and brutal manner, and the seemingly separate daily acts of abuse had in fact been closely linked to each other like a chain, which would be gravely sufficient to provoke a reasonable person in Sundarti’s position. The calmness she displayed in the aftermath of the killing should not be regarded as no loss of self-control, as different killers who lost control while committing murder have different emotions in the aftermath of their crimes.

Since these events were endured over a long period of time before Sundarti finally snapped on the day of the killing, in addition to the fact that there was no cooling-off period for Sundarti to actually able to regain her self-control and calm down after the provocation and loss of control, Justice Rubin ruled that Sundarti should not be held fully culpable for capital murder since she was indeed gravely provoked into killing Ng. The nature of the numerous, haphazard grievous injuries found on Ng and her daughter was also sufficient to imply that Sundarti had indeed lost full control of herself as a result of the humiliation she suffered in Ng’s hands, and from the weak-looking, frail and thin appearance of Sundarti, whom he observed as a mild-mannered and soft-spoken person, she probably lost her head to such an extent that she used enormous force to inflict the deep injuries on Ng notwithstanding her exhaustion from extreme starvation.

Aside from accepting this defence, which would be sufficient to reduce the murder charges, Justice Rubin did not neglect to touch on the other defences made by Sundarti, in which she claimed self-defence and sudden fight. He said that Sundarti did not meet the requirements since she did not suffer from any serious physical harm from the fight and there were extensive defensive wounds on Ng, hence he dismissed these two other defences.

In conclusion, the judge stated that the case was a tragic one as it brought much pain and suffering to both the victims and defendant, and their respective loved ones. Firstly, from the victims’ side, not only did the victims lose their lives, Poh lost his wife and daughter, and for Leon, he lost his mother and sister. Also, he said that Sundarti was facing a pitiful plight since had come from a foreign land to earn income to provide her family a better life, but was now facing a serious charge that could carry the death penalty. This tragedy, Justice Rubin implicitly stated, was started by Ng’s own malicious behaviour towards her maid, which made her partly responsible for her own self-demise at the hands of her maid who finally had had enough of her abuse and lost her self-control and thus committed the killings in a moment of uncontrollable rage and passion. Also, Justice Rubin stated that the decision of Sundarti to save 18-month-old Leon from the fire clearly proved that Sundarti was “not an embodiment of wickedness and evil, but a woman of normal emotions who went awry momentarily.” From a past judgement of a British court case, Justice Rubin quoted, “manslaughter arises from the sudden heat of the passions, murder from the wickedness of the heart”.

As such, Justice Rubin reduced the murder charges and convict Sundarti of culpable homicide not amounting to murder. After hearing the submissions from both the prosecution and defence, Justice Rubin decided to sentence Sundarti to the maximum term of life imprisonment, and backdate her sentence to the date of her arrest on 10 June 2002, based on the extreme violence and grave nature of the lethal attack Sundarti initiated against Ng and Crystal.

By the landmark ruling of the appeal by life convict Abdul Nasir Amer Hamsah on 20 August 1997, life imprisonment, which originally meant a fixed term of 20 years in jail, should be considered as a jail term lasting the remainder of a life convict's natural life, and it applied to those who committed offences after the date of the appeal ruling. Since Sundarti's crime took place nearly five years after the date of the appeal verdict, her life sentence meant "natural life" and she would serve it for the rest of her natural lifespan, though she still can be released on parole for good behaviour after at least 20 years of her sentence.

The prosecution did not appeal against the High Court’s verdict, and Sundarti herself also did not appeal against her sentence. If she served with good behaviour in prison, she could become eligible for release on parole after serving at least 20 years, and the parole hearing could take place on or after 10 June 2022. She may also be entitled to appeal to the President of Singapore to commute the remaining part of her sentence after serving an appropriate length of her sentence.

=== Reactions ===
Reportedly, Sundarti was grateful for the reduction of her charges and her 51-year-old mother Binarti was grateful to the mercy shown by the courts and her daughter’s lawyer, as well as the support from the Indonesian embassy, who sent representatives to the trial to give support to Sundarti and her family. Additionally, Sundarti made an apology publicly in court to Ng’s bereaved family over her crime.

After his former maid was sentenced, Drake Poh and his family could not accept the verdict, as they hoped for Sundarti to be sentenced to death. Poh had reportedly told newspapers that he refused to accept Sundarti’s apology for murdering his wife and daughter. Poh’s mother-in-law reportedly accused the court for alleged miscarriage of justice and there was no fairness or justice served for her daughter and granddaughter upon hearing that the court did not sentence Sundarti to death.

== Aftermath ==
=== Drake Poh ===
After the conclusion of the events and trial, Poh did not truly get over the death of his wife, whom he met in 1996 and later married in 1998. Poh, who had been observing a strict healthy diet after a kidney transplant in India in 1992, gradually turned to drinking and began to not control his diet by consuming unhealthy foods, which persisted despite the advice of his family members to not do so.

Despite the grave heartbreak he suffered, Poh did not neglect his son’s well-being, and often found time to spend with his son by making trips to the library or shopping centres during the weekends. Poh even volunteered at Tao Nan School to ensure his son would secure a place in the school and undergo good education so that he will not go astray. He also made sure that his son could be fluent in both Chinese and English by communicating with him in both languages. Poh said that he had been unable to trust maids after the incident, and even though he hired a Filipino maid to take care of Leon in his absence, Poh’s elderly mother would be present and help take care of Leon while the maid handled the housework. According to Poh’s sister Jenny, Leon was the only source of happiness and joy Poh had possessed, and the father and son often would visit the graves of Ng and Crystal.

Eventually, the unhealthy lifestyle and anguish Poh suffered from the deaths of his wife and daughter took a toll on Poh’s health, and he experienced a stroke in early 2008, which affected his speech ability. Poh’s transplanted kidney also began to fail, causing him to undergo dialysis again. Poh’s condition worsened to the point of hospitalisation on 3 October 2008, and he died a week later on 10 October, at the age of 50. Leon was reportedly entrusted to the care of Poh’s 72-year-old elderly mother and Poh’s siblings.

=== In popular media ===
Sundarti’s case was re-enacted in Singaporean crime show Crimewatch in the show's first episode in the year 2005; this episode is available on meWATCH. Sundarti’s case was also re-enacted in True Files, another local crime show. Even though True Files is viewable on meWATCH, for unknown reasons, the episode detailing Sundarti’s trial and crime is not available on the website.

An Indonesian book titled Dreamseekers: Indonesian Women as Domestic Workers in Asia had also recorded Sundarti’s case in its chapters.

=== Related cases ===
Sundarti is considered the first among many Indonesian women who were domestic maids that have either murdered their employers, or relatives of said employers, in the first 22 years of the 21st century. The following women are:

- Purwanti Parji, who murdered her Singaporean employer's mother-in-law at Paya Lebar, on 4 August 2003. Purwanti was said to have strangled 57-year-old Har Chit Heang to death due to the victim allegedly mistreating her, and Purwanti also forged the death as suicide in an attempt to cover up her criminal conduct before the police arrested her as a suspect. Initially charged with murder, Purwanti pleaded guilty to a lesser offence of manslaughter in September 2004. After considering the brutality of the crime, the High Court sentenced Purwanti to life imprisonment. Purwanti was 17 years and ten months old at the time she killed Har.
- Siti Aminah and Juminem, two maids who murdered their 47-year-old Singaporean employer, Esther Ang Imm Suan on the 2 March 2004, and stole her jewellery and money from her house. It was alleged that Ang had been harsh in her scolding of the maids and expectations of her maids' performance and it caused them both to resort to violence and therefore committed the killing. Both Juminem and Siti were charged with murder, a crime which warrants the death penalty under Singaporean law, but during the trial, it was revealed that both the maids were suffering from different types of depression that affected their mental faculties at the time of the offence. After a 19-day trial, on 5 September 2005, both Siti and Juminem were found guilty of lesser charges of manslaughter, and Siti was sentenced to ten years in prison while Juminem was sentenced to the maximum penalty of life imprisonment.
- Yanti Sukardi, was found guilty in 2008 of strangling her female Saudi Arabian employer as she slept and stealing her jewellery. Yanti was beheaded by sword in the south-western province of Asir. It was the second execution announced in Saudi Arabia in 2008, after a year in which a record number of people were put to death.
- Wilfrida Soik, a mentally ill woman who the Indonesian government said was trafficked to Malaysia. She was charged with stabbing and murdering her elderly Malaysian employer 42 times in 2010. Her defence team argued she was constantly verbally and physically abused. After a five-year battle, the Indonesian government has won the fight to free her from death row in Malaysia. This legal battle caused controversy for the Indonesian government as it had worked hard to secure Wilfrida Soik's release while maintaining a hardline stance on its own death row prisoners, including the Bali Nine ringleaders Myuran Sukumaran and Andrew Chan, who were executed on 29 April 2015 for drug trafficking offences, three months prior.
- Tuti Tursilawati, was a housekeeper who was convicted in 2011 of the murder of her Saudi Arabian employer Suud Malhag Al Utaibi, who she had been serving since 2009 and who had allegedly raped her. She was executed on October 29, 2018 in Saudi Arabia. According to her, on May 11, 2010 she killed him in self-defense when he tried to rape her, she was 34 years old when she was executed. Tursilawati was already the third housekeeper to be executed in 2018 in Saudi Arabia.
- Hanny Papanicolaou, an Indonesian citizen who worked as a housekeeper in Sydney for her client Marjorie Welsh, an Australian citizen. Papanicolaou broke into Welsh's home in Ashbury on 2 January 2019 with the intention to steal money from. Once she was discovered by Welsh, Papanicolaou proceeded to bash her elderly client with her walking sticks before stabbing her several times with a kitchen knife. Welsh managed to alert emergency services by pressing the alert button on a medical assistance device she wore around her neck. The 92-year-old initially survived the assault, identifying her attacker as "Hanny the cleaner" to neighbours and paramedics who had rushed to help her. Welsh died from her injuries in hospital six weeks later but not before telling the police who assaulted her. In a recorded police interview, Welsh described Papanicolaou as "utterly ferocious" when she was attacking her after telling the officers that she thought that she and Papanicolaou were really good friends and that she only saw kindness from her. In May 2022, the prosecution of her trial states that Papanicolaou had motive, as she needed money because of her gambling losses and was addicted to gambling as well. The court heard that Papanicolaou lost around $400 at the Canterbury RSL from playing the poker machines there, just hours before invading Welsh's home. Papanicolaou was sentenced to a term of imprisonment for 22 years with a non-parole period of 15 years, starting at her arrest on January 2, 2019. She will be eligible for parole on January 1, 2034, with her parole to expire seven years later in 2041.

== See also ==
- Zin Mar Nwe case
- Murder of Seow Kim Choo
- Capital punishment in Singapore
- Life imprisonment in Singapore
- List of major crimes in Singapore
