= Murder of Seow Kim Choo =

2016 crime in Singapore

- Funeral photo of Seow Kim Choo
- Date: 7 June 2016
- Time: 8pm (SGT)
- Location: Telok Kurau, Joo Chiat, Singapore
- Outcome: Daryati sentenced to life imprisonment for murder by the High Court in 2021; Daryati losing her appeal against her murder conviction in 2022; Daryati serving her sentence at Changi Women's Prison since 9 June 2016
- Deaths: Seow Kim Choo
- Injuries: Ong Thiam Soon
- Convicted: Daryati
- Verdict: Guilty
- Convictions: Murder (Daryati; one count)
- Sentence: Life imprisonment

On 7 June 2016, 59-year-old Seow Kim Choo (萧金珠 Xiāo Jīnzhū) at Telok Kurau, Singapore, was murdered by her 23-year-old Indonesian maid Daryati (who goes by one name), who stabbed Seow 94 times with a knife, resulting in Seow's death due to multiple wounds to her head and neck. Daryati also attacked and stabbed Seow's husband Ong Thiam Soon (王添顺 Wáng Tiānshùn; also spelt Ong Kian Soon) twice before she was restrained by Ong, and subsequently, Daryati was arrested and indicted for charges of murder and attempted murder. The motive behind Daryati killing her employer was because she wanted to get back her passport to return to Indonesia, as she was feeling homesick and missed her lesbian lover, who was working as a maid in Hong Kong.

Daryati initially faced the death penalty since her original charge was one of intentional murder (which carries the mandatory punishment of death in Singapore) before the charge was reduced to one of murder with no intention to kill, with the prosecutors deciding to not seek the death penalty. At first, Daryati pleaded guilty to the lower charge before she subsequently withdrew her plea of guilt and put up a defence of diminished responsibility in an effort to further reduce her charge to manslaughter. The defence was later rejected, and she was thus sentenced to life imprisonment after the High Court convicted her of murder a second time. Daryati lost her appeal against her conviction a year later, and she remains in prison serving her sentence since then.

== Murder of Seow Kim Choo ==
On the night of 7 June 2016, at around 8 pm, in a private estate neighbourhood at Telok Kurau, a married elderly couple living in one of the three-story semi-detached houses was attacked by one of their two Indonesian maids, with the wife being stabbed to death and the husband seriously injured. According to neighbours, they were shocked to hear about the killing that took place inside their neighbourhood. Several of them told the newspapers that they witnessed the police and ambulance arriving outside the house, after the first police report was lodged at 8:48 pm. Among the witnesses interviewed, there were three Malaysians who told the reporters that when they passed by the house, they saw a man, who was bleeding in the neck, restraining the maid (who earlier on stabbed the man and killed the man's wife) and bringing her outside the house with her hands tied. The man sought help and asked the Malaysian trio to help guard the maid while awaiting the police's arrival. Upon hearing that the maid killed his mother, the man's 34-year-old younger son (who just arrived home) angrily punched the maid before the arriving police officers restrained him as they officially placed the maid, identified as 23-year-old Daryati (who goes by one name), under arrest for murder.

The deceased victim, who was discovered lying on the floor of the master bedroom's toilet, was Daryati's 59-year-old employer Seow Kim Choo, and the injured man was Seow's 57-year-old husband Ong Thiam Soon, a businessman who was the director of three engineering firms in Singapore. The couple had two sons, a daughter-in-law and two grandchildren, who all lived together with them at their family's Telok Kurau house. According to people known to Seow, Seow was a nice person and easygoing, kind-hearted employer.

Soon after her arrest, Daryati was escorted by police to Changi General Hospital (CGH), where she was hospitalized and received treatment for injuries she sustained on her head and hands during the crime. She was scheduled to be charged the next day for murdering Seow and attacking Ong.

Ong, who survived the stabbing, was later hospitalized at Singapore General Hospital. After accepting an interview by reporters, Ong recounted that he was outside the house when he heard his wife's screams from upstairs, and thus out of concern, he went up to the master bedroom's bathroom to call for his wife, and after failing to get a response, Ong used a screwdriver to force the door open. Upon the opening of the door, Ong claimed Daryati suddenly attacked him by stabbing his neck. He managed to disarm her but when he went to check on his wife (who was lying dead on the bathroom floor), Daryati picked up the knife and stabbed him on the neck a second time. Ong managed to overpower Daryati during the second fight and used cable wires to tie up Daryati's hands, and took her outside the house, with three passers-by guarding her while he went to check on his wife, who was pronounced dead by paramedics at 9:05 pm upon the arrival of the ambulance (called by Seow's daughter-in-law).

An autopsy report by Dr Teo Eng Swee (or Cuthbert Teo) later revealed that Seow died as a result of multiple stab wounds on her head and neck; a total of 94 knife wounds were found on her, with 78 of the wounds concentrated at Seow's neck, head and face while the remaining wounds were on Seow's left upper limb. At least three of the blows caused fractures to the victim's face. After the completion of forensic examinations, Seow's body was returned to her bereaved family and it was cremated after a funeral on 12 June 2016, where friends and relatives attended and mourned for Seow, who was remembered as a good-hearted family member who looked out for her relatives and acquaintances. Members of the public also offered condolences and flowers to the family of Seow in the aftermath of her murder.

== Perpetrator ==
Daryati
- Born: 14 August 1992 (age 34) or 14 August 1994 (age 32); Lampung, Sumatra, Indonesia
- Status: Incarcerated
- Conviction: Murder under Section 300(c) of the Penal Code (1 count)
- Penalty: Life imprisonment
- Accomplice: Don Hayati (not charged)

Details
- Victims: 1 dead, 1 injured
- Date: 7 June 2016
- Country: Singapore
- Date apprehended: 7 June 2016
- Imprisoned at: Changi Women's Prison (2016)

Daryati (born 14 August 1992 or 1994) was born and raised in Lampung, Sumatra, Indonesia. She had at least two siblings in her family, an older brother and a younger sister. Although her official date of birth was 14 August 1992, Daryati claimed during her murder trial that she was actually two years younger than her official age, meaning that her true date of birth would have been 14 August 1994.

When Daryati was 14 or 15 years old, she was raped and sexually assaulted by her older brother over ten times in a single year. She was then physically assaulted and threatened by her brother to keep silent over the incidents.

As she grew older, Daryati, who studied up to high school, first worked at a prawn factory at her village. Daryati, who was homosexual, had relationship with her fellow employee at the prawn factory. After this, she went to a maid training centre, where she was taught and trained to work as a domestic maid. She then met Indah, who similarly went through the training programme, and they both got romantically involved. While Indah moved to Hong Kong to work as a maid, Daryati was hired by a Singaporean family, the family of Seow Kim Choo, to work as their maid.

Daryati first came to Singapore in April 2016. Reportedly, Daryati was given proper care and treatment by the family while working for the Ongs, who also had another maid named Don Hayati working for their household. She earned S$580 a month, including S$80 as compensation for working on her days off. Daryati's duties were mostly cooking, cleaning, walking the family dogs and doing laundry for the family and she shared these chores with Don Hayati.

== Daryati's murder plot ==
=== Premeditation and motive ===
Daryati felt extremely homesick and lonely, as she missed her family from Indonesia, and also missed her girlfriend who was in Hong Kong. She was not allowed to have a mobile phone and could not contact her family or girlfriend, and could not get her monthly salary until she worked at least eight months under the Ongs. Daryati was not close to the other maid Don Hayati despite befriending her, as she was hired by the wife of one of the couple's sons, and assigned to other work. Daryati was only allowed to go out whenever she helped the family to walk their pet dogs. Her passport was also taken from her and locked inside the family's safe.

Since May 2016, only a month into her employment at the Ongs, Daryati formulated a plan to retrieve her passport in order to return to Indonesia, by force if necessary, and she also intended to rob the family of their money (also kept in a safe locker), which she intended to use for starting a business in Indonesia. Daryati told Don Hayati about her plan and roped her in to help themselves to retrieve their passports and steal the money. Daryati was also secretly prepared to resort to killing her employers if necessary, as written in her diary entry dated 12 May 2016 (though Daryati claimed it meant she would risk death to execute her plan):

I must carry out this plan quickly. I have to be brave even though life is at stake. I am ready to face all risks, whatever the risk, I must be ready to accept it. I hope that this plan succeed and run smoothly. My employer's family is my target. DEATH!!! (translated from Bahasa Indonesia to English)

In another diary entry dated 2 June 2016, Daryati drew a map to illustrate the layout of the house, to facilitate her plan to take the money and passport before escaping.

=== Execution of murder plot ===
On 7 June 2016, in the second month of her employment at the Ongs' household, Daryati decided to carry out her plan. She selected this date due to it being the day when Seow's brother would arrive at the house to visit his sister, and would bring a huge sum of money to give to Seow as he usually did during his regular visits. Without discussing it with Don Hayati, Daryati armed herself with a hammer and three knives (one of them sharpened) - a kukri, a long knife and a small knife, and hid them at various locations of the house. The knives were intended for use to attack her employer Seow Kim Choo and the hammer was intended to assault Seow's daughter-in-law if she appeared during the attack. After Seow's brother and children left the house at around 8:00 pm, Daryati decided it was the right time to strike. She first asked Don Hayati to distract Ong and bring him downstairs, and also to act as lookout for her while she went upstairs to threaten Seow.

After retrieving her knives from their respective hiding places, Daryati brought Seow into the room, under the pretext of passing her the clothes she ironed. Underneath the clothes, Daryati brandished the long knife she hid and used it to threaten Seow, demanding her to return her passport. When Seow began to shout and struggle, Daryati dragged her into the bathroom and locked the door, and she proceeded to stab and slash Seow multiple times, including on the neck. A total of 94 wounds were inflicted upon 59-year-old Seow Kim Choo, who died from the relentless stabbing. Subsequently, Daryati also attacked Ong upon seeing him appearing at the bathroom before she was finally restrained and later arrested.

== Trial proceedings ==
=== Charge of intentional murder ===
==== Indictment and pre-trial remand ====
After her arrest, Daryati was charged with first-degree murder. As the charge of murder Daryati faced was one of murder with intention to kill under Section 300(a) of the Penal Code (also the most serious form of murder), if she was found guilty, the punishment for this offence was the mandatory death penalty. After the completion of police investigations, Daryati was remanded at Changi Women's Prison (Singapore's prison for female criminals) for a two-week period of pre-trial psychiatric evaluation, to assess her mental state at the time of the offences. Daryati additionally faced a second charge of attempted murder for the knife attack on Ong Thiam Soon, but the charge was later stood down during her trial proceedings for murder. Daryati's accomplice, Don Hayati, who was not aware of and uninvolved in the murder despite her participation, was not arrested or charged. Daryati became at least the sixth maid to be charged with murder in Singapore in the last three years, where Singapore witnessed certain high-profile cases of maids killing their employer or the employer's family member, including Dewi Sukowati who was jailed 18 years for the killing of Nancy Gan Wan Geok (ex-wife of Hilton Cheong-Leen).

A psychiatric report by Dr Jaydip Sarkar concluded that Daryati was suffering from an adjustment disorder at the time of the offence, but she was mentally fit to plead and stand trial, as her disorder was not severe enough to cause a substantial impairment of Daryati's mental state.

==== First trial and admissibility of statements ====
After a three-year remand behind bars, Daryati's trial began at the High Court on 23 April 2019. The presiding judge of the case was High Court judge Valerie Thean (daughter of retired judge L P Thean or Thean Lip Ping), and the prosecutors in charge of Daryati's case were Deputy Public Prosecutors (DPPs) Wong Kok Weng, Phoebe Tan and Lim Shin Hui. Daryati was represented by veteran lawyer Mohamed Muzammil Mohamed, who was engaged by the Indonesian embassy to represent Daryati. Daryati was not the first Indonesian maid to be represented by Mohamed during a murder trial; Mohamed had once taken the 2002 defence case of Sundarti Supriyanto, an Indonesian maid who was sentenced to life imprisonment for the double manslaughters of her abusive employer and the employer's daughter.

The prosecution based their case on Daryati's police statements, in which she confessed to her premeditation and her involvement in the crime, and the events of that night. They also referred to Daryati's diary entry dated 12 May, in which she wrote that she was prepared to even kill Seow Kim Choo in the course of taking her passport back, to describe that Daryati had clearly intended to cause the death of Seow in furtherance of her plan, and he pointed out that these chilling words amounted to an ex-ante (meaning "before the event" in Latin) confession of the "brutal and cold-blooded" murder she had planned and executed on that fateful night of 7 June 2016. However, in the next phase of trial on 13 August 2019 (the date before Daryati's 25th or 27th birthday), Daryati's lawyer Mohamed sought to dismiss seven of Daryati's nine police statements as inadmissible sources of evidence due to these statements being made involuntarily.

Mohamed argued that during her questioning by the police at the hospital, Daryati was not fit to give to the police her account of what happened due to the giddiness, nausea and pain from injuries to her hand, and that she was under a state of "oppression" when she was interrogated by the police officers, which caused her to make most of the statements against her will. The presence of a male photographer taking photos of her breast and injuries also caused distress to Daryati, adding to her emotional woes and tendency to make statements that cannot be admitted.

When both Assistant Superintendent of Police (ASP) Mahathir Mohamad and Superintendent (Supt) Burhanudeen Haji Hussainar took the stand, both of them testified that the statements were made voluntarily by Daryati. ASP Mahathir testified that during their questioning, Daryati sobbed at times, but he checked with her that she was all right. Supt Burhanudeen, who was also present, told the court that she was alert and able to articulate her responses and pause for thought. He added that Daryati did not object to having a male photographer taking photos of her injuries, and he added during Mohamed's cross-examination that he would not have forced Daryati to make statements against her will if she was truly feeling unwell. Dr Cuthbert Teo Eng Swee, the forensic pathologist who performed the autopsy on Seow's corpse and was tasked by the police to examine Daryati's injuries, also said Daryati did not object to allowing a male photographer to document her injuries on camera. The statements were eventually ruled admissible as evidence.

=== Lesser murder charge and guilty plea ===
On 6 April 2020, after 17 days of trial from 23 April 2019 to 4 March 2020, the prosecution, after reviewing the case and representations by the defence, decided to reduce the charge of first-degree murder to one of third-degree murder under Section 300(c) of the Penal Code. For this charge of murder, which dictates an offence of murder with no intention of kill but intentionally causes a bodily injury that resulted in death, the punishment is either life imprisonment or death penalty. The prosecution also submitted to the court that they would not press for the death penalty and leave the sentence to the court's discretion. After Daryati pleaded guilty to the charge, it was finalized and she was accordingly convicted of the reduced murder charge.

With the prosecution no longer pursuing the death sentence, the only other possible sentence available for Daryati in accordance to her finalized charge was life imprisonment, the minimum penalty for murder with no intention to kill. However, the sentencing trial was adjourned to allow Daryati's lawyers to prepare a mitigation plea before the courts. At the time of Daryati's conviction, Singapore was experiencing the infectious COVID-19 pandemic that happened globally, which caused a delay to all court proceedings in Singapore.

=== Withdrawal of plea and second trial ===
On 21 September 2020, the date when Daryati was scheduled to submit her mitigation plea before sentencing, Daryati's lawyer Mohamed Muzammil Mohamed submitted to the trial court that Daryati wished to withdraw her plea of guilt for the reduced murder charge, as she wanted to put up a defence of diminished responsibility to seek a further reduction of her charge to one of culpable homicide not amounting to murder (or manslaughter), in the hope of avoiding life imprisonment. Under the laws of Singapore, culpable homicide carries a penalty of either life or up to twenty years' jail. The trial proceedings resumed in October 2020 after Daryati's conviction was overturned through the withdrawal of her guilty plea.

Daryati testified during the second trial that she suffered from persistent depressive disorder. She revealed to the court her traumatic experiences of being raped and abused by her brother, and stated that she suffered from nightmares as a result of the continual sexual assaults since her teenage years. She also stated that she had been experiencing depressive episodes since the start of the rapes, and these episodes were also stemmed by her shame of being a rape victim and a homosexual, even when she came to Singapore. She also stated that she was in a state of anger at the time of the stabbing, and thus she lost control and could not control her hands from stabbing. The defence's psychiatrist, Dr Tommy Tan, also supported her defence of diminished responsibility by submitting a medical report, in which he diagnosed Daryati with persistent depressive disorder, based on her alleged symptoms since her adolescence and the interviews with Daryati's mother, sister and Don Hayati. Dr Tan, who took the stand in February 2021, stated that Daryati also experienced homesickness and suicidal thoughts, as well as her difficulty to sleep and loss of appetite etc., which were signs leading to the conclusion that Daryati was suffering from diminished responsibility.

However, the prosecution described the killing as "relentless" and "cruel", stating that Daryati lied about having nightmares and contended Daryati had control over her actions and was not suffering from any mental condition that amounted to an impairment of her mental state at the time of the offence, and stated that she clearly premeditated the plan by preparing knives to confront Seow over her passport, showing her ability to plan and reason. They also argued that Daryati was not truthful in her account to Dr Tan as she did not tell the prosecution's psychiatrist Dr Jaydip Sarkar about the nightmares. Dr Sarkar also took the stand in February 2021 to tell the court that although Daryati felt sad, anxious, frustrated and homesick shortly after arriving in Singapore, she did not suffer from an abnormality of the mind. Dr Sarkar also stated that based on his interviews with Daryati's friends, family and Seow Kim Choo's family, Daryati did not have problems with her daily functioning since she had completed high school, found work and made friends back in Indonesia, as well as ate normally, had not lost much weight, and was able to make friends.

=== Sentence ===
On 23 April 2021, exactly two years after Daryati first stood trial, the trial judge, Justice Valerie Thean, rejected Daryati's diminished responsibility defence and thus found Daryati guilty of murder a second time.

Explaining why she did not accept the defence of diminished responsibility, Justice Thean stated that the psychiatric report by Dr Tommy Tan was mostly based on Daryati's self-reported symptoms and there were no independent facts to corroborate them. The actions of Daryati before, during and after the murder did not show that she was suffering from any abnormality of the mind. As such, compared to the more reliable and credible psychiatric evidence of the prosecution, the defence's psychiatric evidence did not stand up to scrutiny and thus the trial judge determined that Daryati did not suffer from persistent depressive disorder. Given that Daryati had intentionally caused the 94 knife injuries on 59-year-old Seow Kim Choo, such that some of these wounds in the ordinary course of nature could cause death, Justice Thean was satisfied that the essential elements of the third-degree murder charge against Daryati were made out and thus convicted her as charged.

After convicting Daryati of murder, Justice Thean sentenced Daryati to life imprisonment, and backdated the sentence to the date of Daryati's first remand (which was on 9 June 2016). The judge noted that the prosecution did not seek the death penalty, and she also stated that based on her observations and reference to the precedent case of Chan Lie Sian (a brothel owner who got a life sentence for murder), the circumstances of Daryati's case were not sufficiently abhorrent and callous to call for the imposition of the maximum punishment of death, which was only reserved for the exceptional cases of murder that sparked an outrage of the community's feelings and demonstrated an offender's viciousness and/or a blatant disregard for human life, as first coined by the 2015 landmark case of Kho Jabing.

Among the factors that made Justice Thean decide not to sentence Daryati to death, the judge took into consideration Daryati's young age of 21 or 23 at the time of the murder, her lack of exposure to the outside world other than the protective environments of her village and previous workplaces in Indonesia, and her emotional and psychological trauma of sexual assaults and violence perpetrated by her brother. The trial judge also accepted that Daryati formulated the murder plot due to her desperation to return home and homesickness, and that she reluctantly made the difficult decision to come to Singapore out of filial duty for her ailing parents and the family's needs to resolve their financial poverty. These above circumstances mitigated the gruesome nature of the crime to the extent that there were sufficient grounds to persuade Justice Thean to spare Daryati from the gallows due to her low behavioural exhibition of viciousness and disregard for human life. In her own words, Justice Thean quoted as she passed the life sentence on Daryati:

The specific nature of the incident did not reflect a cold and calculated killing, but rather, intense panic and distress in executing her plan to return home. I therefore exercised my discretion to impose a term of life imprisonment.

After Daryati's sentencing, Daryati filed an appeal against her murder conviction. The prosecution, who did not appeal, subsequently withdrew the charge of attempted murder against Daryati for the grievous attack on Ong Thiam Soon, who was 62 years old at the time Daryati was sentenced by the High Court. Although the minimum sentence of life imprisonment for murder was accompanied with mandatory caning under Singapore law, Daryati was spared the cane since she was female.

== Appeal and aftermath ==
On 31 March 2022, Daryati lost her appeal against her conviction for the murder of Seow Kim Choo.

In their verdict, the Court of Appeal's three-judge panel, consisting of Senior Judge Chao Hick Tin and two Judges of Appeal Andrew Phang and Steven Chong, agreed with the trial judge Valerie Thean's findings that Daryati was not suffering from diminished responsibility at the time of Seow's murder. Justice Phang, who delivered the verdict, stated there was clear evidence that Daryati did not experience any functional impairment during her time in Indonesia or in Singapore. She was able to manage her workload and assigned chores, and had no problems with her social abilities and communication. Justice Phang quoted, "In addition, the substantial degree of plotting on the part of the appellant (Daryati) displayed her ability to plan ahead and reason clearly," which indicated that Daryati did not lose control at all with her ability to think clearly and plan out the crime.

Also, Justice Phang dismissed the arguments of Daryati's new lawyer Leon Koh, pointing out that every person, including normal people and those with mental disorders, can also behave irrationally, which did not necessarily suggest that a person was suffering from an abnormality of mind as defined under the law. They found that Daryati stabbed Seow out of anger, which was not perpetuated by the combination of factors like her alleged disorders and the trauma of her brother's sexual assaults. He also read out that the judges were of the view that Dr Tan's report did not provide a full picture of Daryati's mental state due to it being made based on Daryati's self-reported symptoms (for instance, Daryati's weight loss was not significant and it only amounted to 0.5 kg), and there were numerous objective evidence that contradicted Dr Tan's findings, which thus led to the apex court's conclusion that Daryati's mental state did not satisfy the three elements required for a substantial defence of diminished responsibility under the law. As for Daryati's homesickness, the Court of Appeal conceded this information but they found it as a normal emotion commonly harboured and shared by numerous other foreign women who came to Singapore as maids like Daryati.

Having rejected the defence of diminished responsibility, the Court of Appeal hereby dismissed Daryati's appeal. Since neither Daryati nor the prosecution appealed the sentence of life imprisonment imposed by Justice Thean, Daryati's life sentence was upheld and effectively finalized. Daryati was allowed to make an overseas phone call to inform her family of the verdict before she was taken back to Changi Women's Prison, where she is currently incarcerated, serving her life term since 9 July 2016. Although Daryati's life sentence meant a term of imprisonment for the duration of her remaining lifespan, it still carries a possibility of release by parole after a minimum of twenty years in jail on account of her overall conduct in prison.

During the time of her incarceration, Daryati's case was recalled once again in light of the Punggol Field murder, in which the murderer Surajsrikan Diwakar Mani Tripathi was sentenced in September 2022 to lifetime imprisonment and 15 strokes of the cane after pleading guilty to the killing of a jogger. In response to the public probe about why the death penalty was not imposed on Surajsrikan, several lawyers explained that compared to Kho Jabing's case, Surajsrikan's conduct was not sufficiently abhorrent and vicious enough to warrant the death penalty. Daryati's case was cited as a similar example to Surajsrikan's case, in which Daryati was given a life sentence on account that her crime was not a cold and calculated killing, but a product of her depressed emotions, desperation to return home and homesickness, as well as her trauma of rape, all taken into account during sentencing.

== See also ==
- Zin Mar Nwe case
- Sundarti Supriyanto
- Life imprisonment in Singapore
- Capital punishment in Singapore
- List of major crimes in Singapore
