= Purwanti Parji case =

2003 case of a maid killing her Singaporean employer's mother-in-law

Purwanti Parji
- Born: 5 September 1985 (age 41); Indonesia
- Status: Imprisoned since 4 August 2003; possibly released on parole after spending minimally 20 years in jail
- Conviction: Manslaughter
- Penalty: Life imprisonment

Details
- Victims: 1
- Date: 4 August 2003
- Country: Singapore
- Date apprehended: 4 August 2003

On 4 August 2003, 17-year-old Purwanti Parji, an Indonesian citizen and former maid, murdered her Singaporean employer's mother-in-law at Paya Lebar. Purwanti was said to have strangled 57-year-old Har Chit Heang (Chinese: 夏织香; Pe̍h-ōe-jī: Hā Chit-hiang; pinyin: Xià Zhīxiāng) to death due to the victim allegedly mistreating her, and Purwanti also forged the death as suicide in an attempt to cover up her criminal conduct before the police arrested her as a suspect. Initially charged with murder, Purwanti pleaded guilty to a lesser offence of manslaughter in September 2004. After considering the brutality of the crime, the High Court sentenced Purwanti to life imprisonment.

== Early life of Purwanti ==
Purwanti Parji was born in Indonesia on 5 September 1985. She grew up in a poor family, and she did not have a good relationship with her stepmother. She had to care for her three step-brothers from the age of nine. At the age of 13, Purwanti was sent to Jakarta to work as a maid, and four years later, soon after she reached the age of 17, Purwanti first came to Singapore to work as a maid in November 2002, after a Singaporean family hired her. She stayed at her employer's flat in Woodlands during the weekends, but would return with her employer during weekdays to Paya Lebar's Tai Keng Gardens, where the employer's mother-in-law Har Chit Heang resided in one of the bungalows located in the area.

== Death of Har Chit Heang ==
Har Chit Heang
- Born: Har Chit Heang; 3 August 1946; Colony of Singapore
- Died: 4 August 2003 (aged 57); Paya Lebar, Singapore
- Cause of death: Strangulation
- Known for: Murder victim
- Spouse: Michael Leong Kit Heng
- Children: Leong Meng Wee (older son); Unnamed younger son

On 5 August 2003, Purwanti was charged with the murder of Har Chit Heang, her employer's mother-in-law, a day before.

According to Purwanti, she was abused by Har on several occasions previously, and Har had harshly criticized her for any mistake she made. She made Purwanti wash and rewash soya sauce bottles if they were not cleaned to her satisfaction, and also did not allow Purwanti to have any food and scolded Purwanti for eating more than she should, leading to Purwanti having to beg for bread to eat from the maid who worked for Har's neighbour. On 4 August 2003, the day of the killing itself, Purwanti was once again scolded by Har for not cleaning the toilet properly. As a result of the scolding, Purwanti increasingly grew angry and hatched a plan to kill Har while she was doing her daily chores in the house.

The other facts of the case were, Purwanti twice approached Har while she was sleeping in her bedroom with her newborn granddaughter lying alongside her. For these two occasions, Purwanti did not act on her intention to kill Har, but finally on the third occasion, Purwanti armed herself with a knife and entered Har's room to execute her plot. Right at the last moment however, Purwanti did not use the knife but used her bare hands to strangle Har, pinning her down and covering her eyes while the 57-year-old woman struggled for her life. Har, who celebrated her 57th birthday just the day before, died as a result of the strangulation. After this, Purwanti cut the victim's right wrist with the knife and placed it on her left hand, making it look like Har committed suicide. She also cut her nails and even took her employer's baby outside the room, locking the door. She pretended to seek help from a neighbour's maid, claiming that her employer locked herself in her room to do something and she cannot get in. After the police were called, they broke through the door to find Har's dead body, and efforts to resuscitate her failed.

Although the case was initially investigated as a possible suicide, it was subsequently reclassified as murder when Purwanti was arrested as a suspect, after the police observed that her nails were neatly cut and became suspicious of her conduct while they were at the house. Purwanti admitted to the crime after she was interrogated during custody. Also, forensic pathologist Dr George Paul certified that the death of Har was due to strangulation, due to him finding the neck fractures and the abrasions and bruises around the neck, and the damage to the neck structures due to the strangulation was sufficient to cause death in the ordinary course of nature.

After her arrest, it was also revealed by police investigations that Purwanti had lied to authorities that her age was 21, and her real age was actually 17 years and ten months old at the time she killed Har. It also meant that as a result of her age being lower than 18, Purwanti would not face the death penalty for murdering Har even if she was convicted, and the only sentence available for her was indefinite detention under the President's Pleasure, then the sentence for minors who committed murder or other capital crimes while below 18 at the time of the offence.

== Purwanti's trial ==
=== Proceedings and submissions ===
Before her trial, Purwanti's murder charge was reduced to culpable homicide not amounting to murder, equivalent to manslaughter in Singapore's legal terms. The lesser offence did not carry a death sentence, but if convicted, Purwanti could either be jailed for life, or up to ten years behind bars. Purwanti, who pleaded guilty to the reduced charge in September 2004, was represented by veteran criminal lawyer Subhas Anandan and another attorney named Mohamed Nasser bin Mohamed Ismail, while Jaswant Singh led the prosecution. Judicial Commissioner V K Rajah was the trial judge who presided the case.

After the completion of the guilty plea and presenting the full statement of facts, the prosecution sought the maximum sentence of life imprisonment, on the grounds that the killing was "deliberate and calculated". The prosecution stated that the severity of the crime would have warranted Purwanti a conviction for murder, but she could not receive the death penalty for she killed Har while she was underaged, and the prosecution had no choice but to exercise its prerogative to reduce the charge against her. However, the prosecution stated this did not detract away the cold-blooded nature of the offence, since Purwanti clearly did not momentarily lose her self-control or sense of judgement when she strangled Har to death, and her anger against Har would have vanished by the time she stopped hesitating like her previous two attempts on Har's life and successfully killed Har on the third attempt, and her strangulation of Har was motivated by ill feeling, and her repeated attempts to kill Har were proof that she was in full control of her actions at the time of the killing.

In response, Anandan argued that Purwanti should not be given a life sentence, as it was unduly harsh for Purwanti, who was a teenager barely above 18 and also a first offender in this case. Anandan also cited in mitigation that Purwanti had suffered relentless abuse from Har, and these series of mistreatment had gradually led to Purwanti unable to contain herself any longer, such that the scolding Purwanti received on the day of the killing became the final proverbial straw that broke the camel's back, causing Purwanti to finally snap and killed Har. Hence, Anandan urged the court to temper justice with mercy and be lenient with Purwanti on behalf of her young age, her lack of criminal records and the abuse she suffered from Har before the crime. Purwanti also made a written letter of apology to Har's family prior to her sentencing trial.

=== Sentence ===
On 29 September 2004, Judicial Commissioner Rajah delivered his verdict on sentence. Justice Rajah accepted that Purwanti may have resented Har for some instances where she perceived Har for allegedly mistreating her. However, he noted that Purwanti was "no shrinking violet unable to fend for herself", and had coldly formulated a calculative scheme to cover up her crime and pass off the death of Har as suicide, which demonstrated her wickedness and unstable character in spite of her young age. He also found little mitigating value in Purwanti's decision to spare the baby's life and her claims of not being abused by other members of the family.

Judicial Commissioner Rajah also stated that the killing cannot be justified or condoned under the pretext of Purwanti being a victim of maid abuse, and he noted that the principle of deterrence should be demonstratively upheld through the sentencing of Purwanti, in view of the increasing cases of maids committing crimes against their employers, the worst of them include murder. Therefore, Judicial Commissioner Rajah felt that as a unequivocal signal to any potential offenders among maids who wanted to retaliate against their violent and abusive employers through crime rather than seeking help from authorities, the sentence should be manifestly adequate in view of these rising cases, and to address the "disturbing case" of Purwanti killing Har, a crime which the judge described as "callous and heinous" with numerous aggravating factors that came into play.

Therefore, Judicial Commissioner Rajah decided that the lower tier of up to ten years' imprisonment was "wholly inappropriate and inadequate" in Purwanti's case, and hence, he decided to, notwithstanding the defendant's relative youthfulness, sentence 19-year-old Purwanti Parji to life in prison, the maximum punishment warranted for manslaughter. The life term was also backdated to the date of Purwanti's arrest on 4 August 2003.

With effect by the landmark ruling of Abdul Nasir Amer Hamsah's appeal on 20 August 1997, life imprisonment in Singapore was to be construed as a sentence of incarceration for the rest of the prisoner's natural life, a departure from the old definition of life imprisonment as 20 years' jail, and the new definition would apply to future cases (specifically those punishable by life) after 20 August 1997. Since Purwanti committed the offence of manslaughter on 4 August 2003, nearly six years after the appeal verdict, Purwanti's life sentence meant that she was to spend the rest of her natural life behind bars. By coincidence, Abdul Nasir was a former client of Purwanti's lawyer Anandan, who twice defended Abdul Nasir during his trials for a Japanese tourist's murder and the abduction of a policeman for ransom.

Har's bereaved family were present to hear the judgement. Michael Leong Kit Heng, the 58-year-old husband of Har, stated that the life sentence was a firm and fair one in spite of Purwanti having avoided the death penalty, and he described her as a "dangerous person". Leong Meng Wei, Har's 33-year-old older son, called the murder of his mother "stupid" and refused to accept Purwanti's apology like the rest of his family members.

Purwanti was the second maid to be given a life sentence for killing a member of her employer's household during that week itself. Four days before her, an Indonesian maid named Sundarti Supriyanto was also sentenced to life in prison for killing her employer Angie Ng and Ng's three-year-old daughter Crystal Poh at Bukit Merah. Like Purwanti, Sundarti was convicted of manslaughter after the trial court found her not guilty of murder on the grounds that she was cruelly deprived of food and maliciously abused by Ng, which caused her to kill the two victims under sudden and grave provocation.

== Appeal of Purwanti ==
After her trial, Purwanti filed an appeal through her lawyers, and her counsel sought to reduce the sentence of life to ten years in prison, stating that life imprisonment was manifestly excessive for Purwanti based on her young age and that she was unlikely to commit any other offence again should she be released, and furthermore, once Purwanti was released, she would be repatriated from Singapore and return to Indonesia and never get to re-enter Singapore again for a period of time. Hence, they asked that Purwanti should be re-sentenced to the lower tier of ten years in jail.

However, on 24 January 2005, the Court of Appeal's three-judge panel, consisting of Chief Justice Yong Pung How, Judge of Appeal Chao Hick Tin and High Court judge Kan Ting Chiu, did not accept the defence's contention. They stated that there had been a significant amount of aggravating factors in Purwanti's case that called for the maximum punishment of a life term despite her age, especially her premeditation to kill Har, the concise steps she took to cover up her crime and the vulnerability of the victim. They also did not rule out the possibility that Purwanti might falsify her identity and re-enter Singapore to seek employment, with reference to the unrelated case of a schoolgirl named Huang Na, whose mother had managed to re-enter Singapore through this manner in spite of her being banned from re-entering Singapore after her conviction for a immigration offence. Huang Na was a victim of another murder case in Singapore back in 2004, the same year Purwanti was found guilty of killing Har Chit Heang; Huang's killer Took Leng How was found guilty of murder and hanged in 2006.

The judges also expressed their concern that ten years was inadequate to address the graveness of Purwanti's crime and also considering the public interest to prevent more cases of maids committing crimes against their employers, a deterrent sentence was needed in similar cases like Purwanti's, and she should be incarcerated for a longer period of time to ensure the principles of rehabilitation and retribution had been served. In conclusion, the Court of Appeal dismissed Purwanti's appeal, and upheld her life sentence.

Although her life term was meant to be one of imprisonment for the remainder of her natural life, Purwanti, who was imprisoned at Changi Women's Prison, is still entitled to be released on parole after at least twenty years behind bars, depending on her conduct in prison. Her earliest parole hearing would be in 2023.

== Aftermath ==
Singaporean crime show True Files re-adapted the case and it aired as the tenth and final episode of the show's fifth and final season on 18 March 2007. It remains the last criminal case to be re-enacted by the series to date since the show was not renewed for a sixth season since 2007.

Purwanti's former lawyer Subhas Anandan appeared on the show to be interviewed regarding the case, and in response to the perception that maids were given special treatment after they escaped the gallows for murdering their employers, Anandan stated that the maids were not receiving special treatment from the law and they did not receive the death penalty due to the circumstances that allowed them to not face execution, like diminished responsibility or sudden and grave provocation, and these claims could also be raised by any Singaporeans who were charged for murder. Anandan stated that Purwanti's sentence of life imprisonment for manslaughter could also be the punishment for any Singaporeans who committed manslaughter under whichever circumstances that called for such a high penalty, and he also commented that life imprisonment itself was in actuality, a harsh punishment (indirectly due to the "natural life" ruling of the Abdul Nasir case). He also stated that employers should be more understanding towards maids and caution should be exercised when it comes to building the relationship between a maid and her employer, due to the tragic consequences that may ensue from the absence of such factors, as proven by Purwanti's case and those of other maids who killed their employers.

The killing of Har Chit Heang was one of the most high-profile cases of maids killing their employers or their employers' family member(s) that occurred in Singapore during the 2000s.

== See also ==
- Sundarti Supriyanto
- Life imprisonment in Singapore
- List of major crimes in Singapore
