= Zin Mar Nwe case =

2018 case of a Myanmar maid charged with murder in Singapore

Zin Mar Nwe
- Born: 2001 (age 24–25); Myanmar
- Occupation: Domestic maid (former)
- Status: Incarcerated at Changi Women's Prison
- Motive: Out of anger over alleged mistreatment by the victim
- Convictions: Murder under Section 300(c) of the Penal Code, reduced to manslaughter
- Criminal charge: 1st charge: Murder of a 70-year-old woman by stabbing
- Penalty: 17 years’ imprisonment

On 25 June 2018, at Singapore's Choa Chu Kang, 17-year-old Zin Mar Nwe, a foreign maid from Myanmar, used a knife to stab her employer's mother-in-law, who was alleged to have abused the maid. The 70-year-old elderly victim, an Indian national, sustained 26 knife wounds and died from acute haemorrhage caused by the stabbing. Zin was arrested not long after the killing and charged with murder. Although the victim was initially named in the local and international media, her name was subsequently not reported to protect the identity of one of her family members who was underage.

Zin, who claimed that she was suffering from diminished responsibility at the time of the murder, stood trial three years later in November 2021 for the crime. The High Court found her guilty of murder on 18 May 2023, and more than a month later, Zin Mar Nwe was sentenced to life in prison on 4 July 2023, after the trial court duly considered that Zin should not be given the death sentence on account that she was a minor when killing the victim and thus, she was spared the gallows and received a life sentence for the brutal crime.

Upon her appeal in 2025, Zin's conviction for murder was reduced to manslaughter by the Court of Appeal in May 2025, and her prison sentence was reduced from life to 17 years on 26 August 2025.

== Background ==
Prior to her arrival in Singapore, Zin Mar Nwe, who was born and raised in Myanmar, was hired and trained to become a domestic maid, and she first came to Singapore on 5 January 2018. Even though her real age was 17, the agent responsible for Zin's employment registered her passport and changed her date of birth, claiming that Zin was 23 years old. In fact, the minimum age to work as a maid in Singapore was 23, and being six years younger, Zin would not have been eligible to become a maid by Singapore employment standards. This was eventually uncovered during police investigations after Zin was arrested.

After she arrived in Singapore, Zin worked for two Singaporean families (one after the other) between January and May 2018. On 10 May 2018, Zin was hired by an Indian-born financial controller who immigrated and settled in Singapore, and she began working for her employer, who lived at Choa Chu Kang with his wife and two teenage daughters.

== Murder ==
On 26 May 2018, sixteen days after Zin Mar Nwe started working for her third employer, her employer's 70-year-old mother-in-law travelled from India to Singapore to come live with her son-in-law and his kin for a month. During the period of her stay, the elderly Indian citizen allegedly abused the 17-year-old maid Zin Mar Nwe (who never suffered abuse from the other members of the household), hitting her (either with bare hands or other objects) and reprimanding her on several occasions whenever the maid did not perform up to expectations or could not understand her instructions. On one occasion, while Zin was massaging the elderly woman, she used too much force and the woman slapped her. On another occasion, in the kitchen, Zin had switched the stove on wrongly which accidentally caused the elderly woman to have her hand slightly burnt. This caused the woman to pull Zin's hands close to the fire. On a third occasion, when Zin was cutting the older woman's toenails, the woman allegedly kicked her in the chest.

On the morning of 25 June 2018, Zin Mar Nwe was alone at home with the elderly woman, who threatened to contact Zin's agent and send her back to Myanmar. Zin was emotionally triggered by the threat, especially since she had already incurred a debt of S$3,300 to come to Singapore to work. In a fit of anger, Zin grabbed a knife from the kitchen and stabbed the woman multiple times while the elderly woman was watching television.

The elderly victim, 70-year-old Mehrotra Shashi, died as a result of acute haemorrhage resulting from the 26 stab wounds (some of which penetrated her heart and lungs) on her body. Three of the wounds were sufficient to cause death in the ordinary course of nature. The victim was pronounced dead at about 3:29pm after a neighbour (who heard the screams) discovered her body and the arrival of paramedics. Police were also contacted to investigate the case, which was classified as murder, and a manhunt was set out to look for Zin who was their prime suspect. Evidence was also collected from the flat, which was cordoned off for more than twelve hours. Neighbours who interacted with the family were shocked to hear about the gruesome murder and stated that the family (who all lived here for at least 17 years) were generally friendly, and described the maid as a "timid" and small-sized person.

Zin Mar Nwe, who escaped the flat with an EZ-Link card and some cash, wandered around Singapore after the stabbing, and she was arrested five hours later upon her arrival at the maid agency to retrieve her passport. Zin was charged with murder two days later on 27 June 2018. The case was extensively reported in the Indian media and Singaporean media, and other countries, due to the high-profile nature of the case.

After the completion of the autopsy at the mortuary of the Health Sciences Authority, the victim's son-in-law retrieved the body for funeral preparations, and more than 30 relatives and friends were present at the victim's funeral at Mandai Crematorium.

== Trial of Zin Mar Nwe ==
=== Prosecution’s case ===
On 9 November 2021, three years after her arrest, Zin Mar Nwe officially stood trial for murder. A month before the beginning of Zin's trial, in October 2021, the courts issued a gag order to prohibit the local media and newspapers in Singapore from continuing to report the name of the victim, in order to protect the identity of one of the trial witnesses, who was below 18 years old and a family member of the victim. Also, Zin Mar Nwe's age was corrected from 23 to 17 after the authorities got wind of her false declaration in her passport and a bone-age test at Tan Tock Seng Hospital confirmed that Zin was "most likely" 17 years old at the time she murdered the deceased. Even though she was a minor when murdering the victim, Zin was tried as an adult.

The charge of murder against Zin Mar Nwe came under Section 300(c) of the Penal Code, which dictates an offence of murder where an offender intentionally inflicted injuries that were sufficient in the ordinary course of nature to cause death, which carries either life imprisonment with caning or the death penalty if found guilty.

The prosecution's case was based on Zin's confession. Zin initially claimed that two dark-skinned people entered the flat to attack and stab the victim to death, but subsequently, Zin changed her story and confessed to killing the elderly woman, claiming that as a Buddhist, she should tell the truth. Although Zin gave numerous different accounts about the crime, she nonetheless admitted to killing the victim and also raised the instances where she was abused by the deceased for some time prior to the stabbing, although the family of the deceased testified that Zin looked normal the day before the murder, and stated that they had a cordial relationship with the maid. Zin stated as a result of the threat of being sent back home and fear of incurring debts, she was triggered and lost control when killing the victim.

=== Defence’s case ===
Zin's main defence at trial was diminished responsibility. Dr Tommy Tan, the defence's psychiatrist, testified on behalf of Zin during the trial. He was of the opinion that Zin suffered from adjustment disorder with mixed anxiety and depressed mood, which were sufficient to impair her mental responsibility at the time of the crime, and rendered Zin not fully conscious of what she was doing, since she was in a "dissociative state" and could not control or remember her acts when she was stabbing the victim. Christopher Bridges, the lawyer who was assigned by the state to defend Zin, sought to rely on Dr Tan's psychiatric report to reduce his client's charge of murder to culpable homicide not amounting to murder, a lesser offence of unlawful killing that warrants either a sentence of up to twenty years' imprisonment or life in prison.

In response, Dr Alias Lijo, a government psychiatrist from the Institute of Mental Health (IMH), was called by the prosecution to testify on Zin's mental state. Dr Lijo rebutted that Zin did not suffer from diminished responsibility at the time of the murder, stating that she had full knowledge of the magnitude of her actions and never had any abnormality of the mind at the time of the stabbing.

== Trial verdict ==
=== Conviction ===
On 18 May 2023, after an 11-day trial that dragged on for more than a year, Justice Andre Maniam, the trial judge presiding over Zin Mar Nwe's case, delivered the verdict.

In his judgement, Justice Maniam stated that he rejected Zin Mar Nwe's defence of diminished responsibility. While he accepted some of Zin's claims that the victim had hit her and scolded her sometimes, Justice Maniam stated that Zin was able to tolerate these instances of mistreatment up until the threat of being sent back home, which triggered her to stab the old woman. The judge found that Zin was not in a dissociative state when she stabbed the victim, and he said Zin was able to intricately describe how she committed the crime and she was aware of what she was doing, and consciously took steps to plan and make her escape in the aftermath of the killing. Justice Maniam also pointed out that Zin had done the stabbing in a fit of anger rather than doing so under an impaired mental state, and described her decision to stab the deceased was an "emotional, irrational" one, which was why he chose to reject Dr Tan's evidence about Zin's alleged mental disorders and accepted Dr Lijo's testimony. Since Zin was conscious of her actions, and had intentionally stabbed the deceased and such that the injuries intentionally inflicted were in the ordinary course of nature to cause death, Justice Maniam found 22-year-old Zin Mar Nwe guilty of murder and convicted her as charged.

Upon her conviction for murder under Section 300(c) of the Penal Code, Zin Mar Nwe faced a possible death sentence or life imprisonment with caning under Section 302(2) of the Penal Code. However, Zin Mar Nwe cannot be caned as she is a woman.

Sentencing was adjourned to a later date and the prosecution and defence were given four weeks' time to file closing submissions on the sentence. Deputy Public Prosecutor (DPP) Kumaresan Gohulabalan, who led the trial prosecution with his colleague Sean Teh, expressed that they would not seek the death penalty in Zin's case. In fact, under the existing laws of Singapore, the death penalty was prohibited in cases where the offender was below 18 years old at the time when they committed murder or other capital crimes. Since Zin was 17 years old when she murdered the elderly woman, she would not be eligible for the death penalty. The only other possible sentence she could receive in this case was life imprisonment.

=== Sentence ===
On 4 July 2023, 22-year-old Zin Mar Nwe was officially sentenced to life imprisonment by the High Court.

The trial judge Andre Maniam noted during sentencing that in accordance to Section 314 of the Criminal Procedure Code (CPC), Zin Mar Nwe cannot be sentenced to death because she was under 18 years old when committing the murder, and thus Justice Maniam could only spare the former maid from the gallows and instead, he meted out a life sentence for Zin Mar Nwe, which was the only sentence permissible by law in her case. He also considered the prosecutor Sean Teh's contention that they did not object to a life term in view of the evidence which proved that the defendant was a minor at the time of the offence.

Prior to her sentencing, Zin submitted a letter pleading for a second chance and her lawyers emphasized Zin's homesickness and longing for her boyfriend and parents (who were still in Myanmar). Reportedly, Zin consulted her lawyers about her option to appeal the verdict after the end of her court session.

== Appeal and re-sentencing ==
After the end of her trial, Zin Mar Nwe filed an appeal to the Court of Appeal.

During the appeal hearing, leading criminal lawyer Josephus Tan and his colleague Cory Wong, who represented Zin in her appeal, argued that Zin had killed the 70-year-old victim under sudden and grave provocation, and combined with the mistreatment she faced from the victim and the many times she had changed employers in Singapore, the victim's threat to send her back to Myanmar was the proverbial straw that broke the camel's back, although the prosecution responded that the act itself was not provocative enough to cause Zin to lose her self-control and kill the victim, and stated that there was no concrete evidence to show that Zin had been a victim of maid abuse.

On 14 May 2025, nearly two years after Zin was first convicted of murder, the Court of Appeal delivered its verdict, downgrading her murder conviction to culpable homicide not amounting to murder, also known as manslaughter. Chief Justice Sundaresh Menon, who heard the appeal with High Court judge See Kee Oon and Judge of Appeal Tay Yong Kwang, stated in the verdict that they accepted the defence of sudden and grave provocation, pointing out that Zin was of relatively young age and harboured the fear of returning home in heavy debt, and the circumstances of her situation up until the murder would have reasonably provoked a person in Zin's position.

Effectively, the reduction of Zin's murder conviction also vacated the life sentence she received for murder. Zin's re-sentencing hearing was adjourned to a later date by the Court of Appeal to allow time for both sides to make submissions. Under Singaporean law, the sentence for manslaughter was either life imprisonment or up to 20 years in prison.

On 26 August 2025, Zin was re-sentenced to 17 years in prison.

== Aftermath ==
In the aftermath of her murder trial in 2023, the case of Zin Mar Nwe also shed light on the phenomenon of underaged maids being employed in Singapore despite the stringent background checks and regulations set to detect underaged maids, and it was found that most of these maids (most of them hailed from Myanmar) were told by their agents to lie about their ages to gain employment in Singapore. The Ministry of Manpower released their data which showed that from 2018 to 2022, the authorities detected around six underage foreign domestic workers per 10,000 such workers in Singapore during that period, in spite of the decline in the number of underage maids detected in the previous three years.

Not only that, due to the high-profile nature of Zin’s case, observers who spoke to the national newspaper The Straits Times expressed that based on the situation of the foreign maids in Singapore (268,500 of them as of December 2022), many had faced significant stressors from the multiple responsibilities they need to fulfill, including household duties and meeting expectations of their employers, and it was especially so should it be taking care of the elderly or special needs children, or the maids being either not skilled enough or too young (since younger maids did not have sufficient maturity and lesser self-confidence than the older ones). First-time maids were also noted for having a lack of community bonds in a foreign country and not having friends to seek help or release their stress. Some maids may also find it difficult to adjust to moving from a rural living environment to an urban living environment, and the lack of family support, learning a new language and other factors also add to their emotional struggles, which was the case for Zin Mar Nwe, who had to travel alone from Myanmar to Singapore, where she worked with a salary of S$450 which her family placed total dependence upon.

It was further revealed by the same newspaper that since 2012, there have been 11 reported cases of maids found guilty of killing their employer or the employer's family member, including Zin herself. Seven of these maids were below the age of 25, and four were 18 years old or younger. According to Zin’s lawyer Christopher Bridges, many maids who suffered from mistreatment had to suppress their distress and emotions for fear of being sent back home, and for Zin, the threat of being sent back to Myanmar and incurring debts from her return, compounded by her financial woes and the abuse, had become the proverbial straw that broke the camel’s back, resulting in Zin becoming overwhelmed with anger and thus murdering the 70-year-old victim.

== See also ==
- Maid abuse
- Capital punishment in Singapore
- Life imprisonment in Singapore
