= List of Asia's Next Top Model contestants =

This is a list of contestants who have appeared on the television show Asia's Next Top Model. Thai model and current host Cindy Bishop (season 4–present), together with a panel of experts, judge a number of aspiring models competing to win a modeling contract, along with other prizes.

A total of six seasons have aired since the show first aired on November 25, 2012. A total of 86 contestants have been selected to compete in its six years running, with six models (Jessica Amornkuldilok, Sheena Liam, Ayu Gani, Tawan Kedkong, Maureen Wroblewitz, and Dana Slosar) having been crowned "Asia's Next Top Model".

Contestants from all over the world of Asian descent are allowed to apply to be on the show through video-auditioning, and then a few chosen are invited to attend casting calls in Singapore.

== Contestants ==
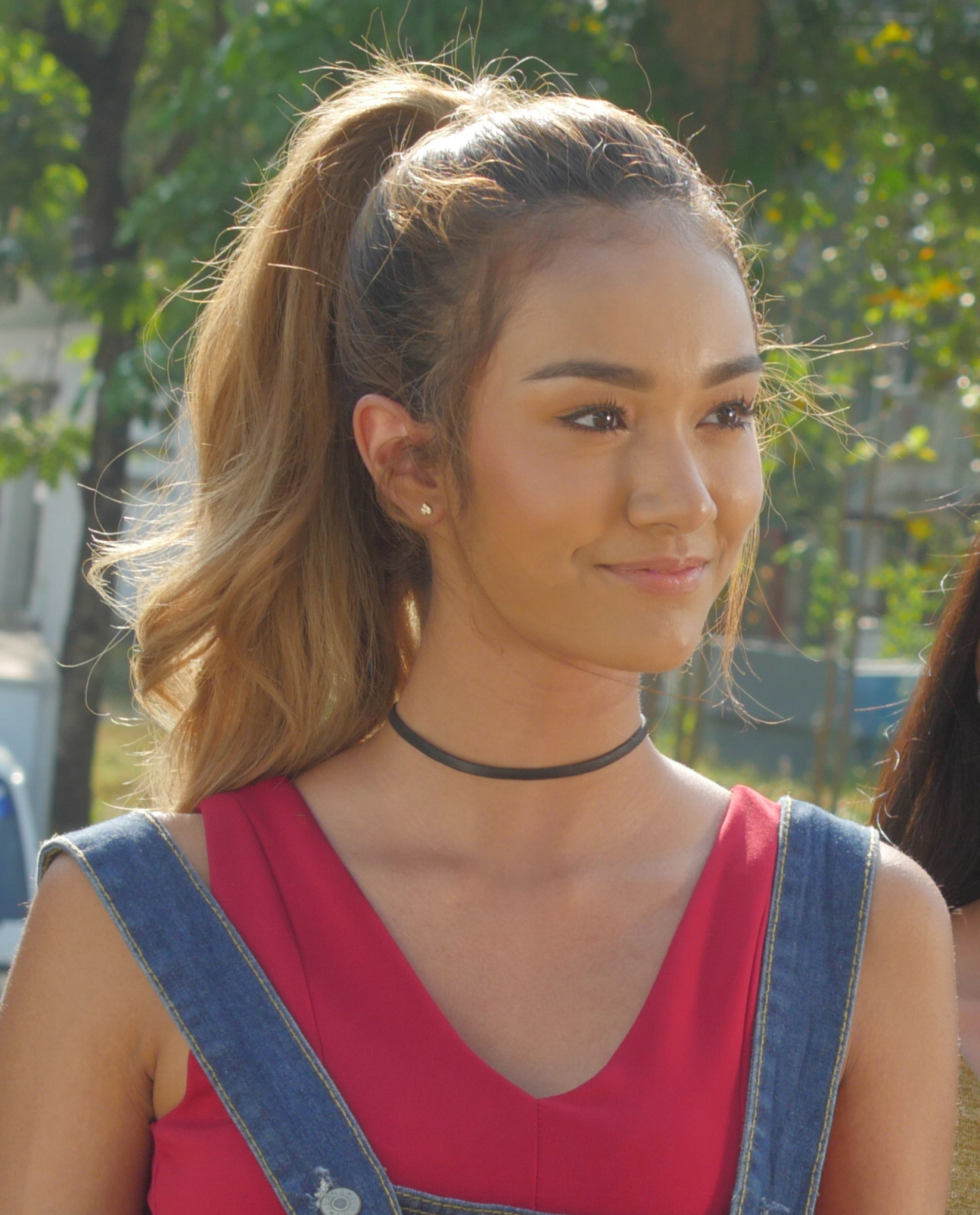
May Htet Aung, AsNTM, season 4

The contestant previously participated in an adaptation of a national Top Model franchise.

Country	Contestant	Age	Height	Finish	Season
Singapore	Kyla Tan	23	1.71 m (5 ft 7 1/2 in)	14th	Season 1
Thailand	Monica Benjaratjarunun	19	1.70 m (5 ft 7 in)	13th (quit)	Season 1
China	Bei Si Liu	24	1.76 m (5 ft 9 1/2 in)	12th	Season 1
South Korea	Jee Choi	27	1.72 m (5 ft 7 1/2 in)	11th/10th	Season 1
Indonesia	Filantropi Witoko	24	1.75 m (5 ft 9 in)	11th/10th	Season 1
Vietnam	Thuy Trang Nguyen^{1}	23	1.80 m (5 ft 11 in)	9th	Season 1
India	Rachel Erasmus	22	1.67 m (5 ft 5 1/2 in)	8th	Season 1
Malaysia	Melissa Th'ng	21	1.68 m (5 ft 6 in)	7th	Season 1
Hong Kong	Helena Chan	22	1.77 m (5 ft 9 1/2 in)	6th	Season 1
Nepal	Aastha Pokharel	20	1.77 m (5 ft 9 1/2 in)	5th	Season 1
Japan	Sofia Wakabayashi	24	1.83 m (6 ft 0 in)	4th	Season 1
Philippines	Stephanie Retuya	23	1.76 m (5 ft 9 1/2 in)	Runners-up	Season 1
Taiwan	Kate Ma	22	1.75 m (5 ft 9 in)	Runners-up	Season 1
Thailand	Jessica Amornkuldilok	26	1.77 m (5 ft 9 1/2 in)	Winner	Season 1
China	Jessie Yang	22	1.70 m (5 ft 7 in)	16th	Season 2
Hong Kong	Elektra Yu	21	1.75 m (5 ft 9 in)	15th	Season 2
Indonesia	Bona Kometa	27	1.79 m (5 ft 10 1/2 in)	14th	Season 2
South Korea	Jihye Moon	20	1.81 m (5 ft 11 1/2 in)	13th	Season 2
Vietnam	Nhu Thao Phan	26	1.73 m (5 ft 8 in)	12th	Season 2
Singapore	Poojaa Gill	22	1.70 m (5 ft 7 in)	11th	Season 2
India	Sneha Ghosh	23	1.75 m (5 ft 9 in)	10th/9th	Season 2
Indonesia	Janice Hermijanto	21	1.74 m (5 ft 8 1/2 in)	10th/9th	Season 2
Thailand	Tia Taveepanichpan	17	1.69 m (5 ft 6 1/2 in)	8th	Season 2
Taiwan	Natalie Pickles	25	1.70 m (5 ft 7 in)	7th	Season 2
Malaysia	Josephine Tan	23	1.73 m (5 ft 8 in)	6th	Season 2
Singapore	Nicole Lee	25	1.75 m (5 ft 9 in)	5th	Season 2
Japan	Marie Nakagawa	24	1.70 m (5 ft 7 in)	4th	Season 2
Philippines	Katarina Rodriguez	21	1.69 m (5 ft 6 1/2 in)	3rd	Season 2
Philippines	Jodilly Pendre	20	1.78 m (5 ft 10 in)	Runner-up	Season 2
Malaysia	Sheena Liam	22	1.74 m (5 ft 8 1/2 in)	Winner	Season 2
Malaysia	Shareeta Selvaraj	24	1.68 m (5 ft 6 in)	14th	Season 3
Thailand	Kiana Guyon	20	1.70 m (5 ft 7 in)	13th	Season 3
Indonesia	Rani Ramadhany	20	1.73 m (5 ft 8 in)	12th	Season 3
Hong Kong	Lorretta Chow	26	1.79 m (5 ft 10 1/2 in)	11th/10th	Season 3
Vietnam	Celine Duong	18	1.74 m (5 ft 8 1/2 in)	11th/10th	Season 3
Philippines	Franchesca Lagua	23	1.73 m (5 ft 8 in)	9th	Season 3
Malaysia	Melissa Tan	27	1.73 m (5 ft 8 in)	8th	Season 3
Hong Kong	KB Barlow	25	1.71 m (5 ft 7 1/2 in)	7th	Season 3
Indonesia	Tahlia Raji	18	1.73 m (5 ft 8 in)	6th	Season 3
Philippines	Amanda Chan	17	1.76 m (5 ft 9 1/2 in)	5th	Season 3
Japan	Barbara Katsuki	27	1.73 m (5 ft 8 in)	4th	Season 3
Singapore	Aimee Cheng-Bradshaw	19	1.75 m (5 ft 9 in)	3rd	Season 3
Philippines	Monika Sta. Maria	23	1.77 m (5 ft 9 1/2 in)	Runner-up	Season 3
Indonesia	Ayu Gani	23	1.73 m (5 ft 8 in)	Winner	Season 3
Thailand	Maya Goldman	22	1.73 m (5 ft 8 in)	14th	Season 4
Mongolia	Tugs Saruul	24	1.80 m (5 ft 11 in)	13th	Season 4
Vietnam	Mai Ngo ^{2}	20	1.73 m (5 ft 8 in)	12th	Season 4
Philippines	Gwen Ruais	25	1.80 m (5 ft 11 in)	11th	Season 4
Philippines	Alaiza Malinao	21	1.73 m (5 ft 8 in)	10th (quit)	Season 4
Hong Kong	Jessica Lam	21	1.76 m (5 ft 9 1/2 in)	9th	Season 4
Indonesia	Aldilla Zahraa	23	1.73 m (5 ft 8 in)	8th	Season 4
Myanmar	May Htet Aung	17	1.75 m (5 ft 9 in)	7th	Season 4
Malaysia	Tuti Noor	24	1.75 m (5 ft 9 in)	6th	Season 4
Singapore	Angie Watkins	19	1.74 m (5 ft 8 1/2 in)	5th	Season 4
Philippines	Julian Flores	25	1.74 m (5 ft 8 1/2 in)	4th	Season 4
South Korea	Sang In Kim	23	1.76 m (5 ft 9 1/2 in)	Runners-up	Season 4
Indonesia	Patricia Gunawan	25	1.68 m (5 ft 6 in)	Runners-up	Season 4
Thailand	Tawan Kedkong	20	1.77 m (5 ft 9 1/2 in)	Winner	Season 4
Philippines	Anjelica Santillan	22	1.76 m (5 ft 9 1/2 in)	14th	Season 5
Thailand	Heidi Grods	25	1.78 m (5 ft 10 in)	13th	Season 5
Philippines	Jennica Sanchez	20	1.68 m (5 ft 6 in)	12th	Season 5
Singapore	Layla Ong	20	1.75 m (5 ft 9 in)	11th	Season 5
Malaysia	Alicia Amin	22	1.75 m (5 ft 9 in)	10th	Season 5
Singapore	Randhawa Nametha	18	1.78 m (5 ft 10 in)	9th (DQ)	Season 5
Indonesia	Valerie Krasnadewi	24	1.72 m (5 ft 7 1/2 in)	8th/7th	Season 5
Thailand	Dorothy Petzold	18	1.72 m (5 ft 7 1/2 in)	8th/7th	Season 5
Indonesia	Veronika Krasnadewi	24	1.72 m (5 ft 7 1/2 in)	6th	Season 5
Taiwan	Cindy Chen	19	1.78 m (5 ft 10 in)	5th	Season 5
Indonesia	Clara Tan	21	1.70 m (5 ft 7 in)	4th	Season 5
Vietnam	Minh Tu Nguyen	24	1.78 m (5 ft 10 in)	Runners-up	Season 5
Malaysia	Shikin Gomez	24	1.77 m (5 ft 9 1/2 in)	Runners-up	Season 5
Philippines	Maureen Wroblewitz	18	1.68 m (5 ft 6 in)	Winner	Season 5
Thailand	Lena Saetiao	20	1.73 m (5 ft 8 in)	14th/13th	Season 6
Hong Kong	Hody Yim	24	1.70 m (5 ft 7 in)	14th/13th	Season 6
Japan	Sharnie Fenn	18	1.73 m (5 ft 8 in)	12th	Season 6
Indonesia	Iko Bustomi	22	1.74 m (5 ft 8 1/2 in)	11th	Season 6
Indonesia	Jesslyn Lim	26	1.78 m (5 ft 10 in)	10th	Season 6
Malaysia	Rubini Sambanthan	26	1.76 m (5 ft 9 1/2 in)	9th	Season 6
Singapore	Yi Han Si	18	1.80 m (5 ft 11 in)	8th	Season 6
Philippines	Jachin Manere	21	1.75 m (5 ft 9 in)	7th	Season 6
Vietnam	Thanh Vy Nguyen	23	1.68 m (5 ft 6 in)	6th	Season 6
Thailand	Pim Bubear	24	1.74 m (5 ft 8 1/2 in)	5th	Season 6
Myanmar	Beauty Thet Thinn	22	1.76 m (5 ft 9 1/2 in)	4th	Season 6
Taiwan	Mia Sabathy^{4}	24	1.79 m (5 ft 10 1/2 in)	Runner-up	Season 6
Philippines	Adela-Mae Marshall^{3}	20	1.73 m (5 ft 8 in)	Runner-up	Season 6
Thailand	Dana Slosar	24	1.75 m (5 ft 9 in)	Winner	Season 6

=== Crossovers ===
1. Thuy Trang Nguyen previously competed in the second season of Vietnam's Next Top Model, where she placed 4th.
2. Mai Ngo previously competed in the fourth season of Vietnam's Next Top Model, where she placed 15th-18th.
3. Adela-Mae Marshall previously competed in the second season of Philippines' Next Top Model, where she placed 2nd.
4. Mia Sabathy previously competed in the seventh season of Austria's Next Top Model, where she placed 3rd.

=== Statistics ===
- Quitters: 2 - Monica Benjaratjarunun (Cycle 1) and Alaiza Malinao (Cycle 4)
- Disqualifications: 1 - Randhawa Nametha (Cycle 5)
- Models eliminated outside of judging panel: 4 - Jessie Yang (Cycle 2), Maya Goldman (Cycle 4), Lena Saetiao (Cycle 6) and Hody Yim (Cycle 6)
- Most times in the bottom two: 5 times - Stephanie Retuya (Cycle 1)
- Most times in the bottom two for a winner: 2 times - Tawan Kedkong (Cycle 4) and Maureen Wroblewitz (Cycle 5)
- Most times in the bottom two for a runner-up: 5 times - Stephanie Retuya (Cycle 1)
- Fewest times in the bottom two for a winner: 0 times - Jessica Amornkuldilok (Cycle 1)
- Fewest times in the bottom two for a runner-up: 0 times - Patricia Gunawan (Cycle 4), Minh Tu Nguyen (Cycle 5) and Shikin Gomez (Cycle 5)
- Most first call-outs for a winner: 4 times - Jessica Amornkuldilok (Cycle 1)
- Most first call-outs for a runner-up: 4 times - Monika Sta. Maria (Cycle 3) and Sang In Kim (Cycle 4)
