= Asia's Next Top Model season 4 =

Asia's Next Top Model
- Season 4
- Cycle 4 cast
- Judges: Cindy Bishop; Kelly Tandiono; Yu Tsai
- No. of contestants: 14
- Winner: Tawan Kedkong
- Runners-up: Patricia Gunawan; Sang In Kim
- No. of episodes: 13

Release
- Original network: STAR World
- Original release: March 9 – June 1, 2016

Season chronology
- ← Previous; Season 3 Next → Season 5

The fourth cycle of Asia's Next Top Model aired from March 9 to June 1, 2016 on STAR World. The judging panel for this cycle was completely replaced; Thai model Cindy Bishop was appointed as host and head judge, and Indonesian model Kelly Tandiono as a model mentor and judge. Yu Tsai joined the show as its creative consultant.

The cycle featured 14 contestants: three from the Philippines, two each from Indonesia and Thailand, and one each from Hong Kong, Malaysia, Mongolia, Myanmar, Singapore, South Korea and Vietnam. China, India, Japan, Nepal and Taiwan were unrepresented. This is notably the only cycle to feature a contestant from Mongolia. While this is the first of two instances Myanmar was presented.

The prize package for this cycle included a Subaru XV, a position as the face of TRESemmé, a cover and fashion spread in Harper's Bazaar Singapore and a modeling contract with Storm Model Management in London.

The winner of the competition was 20-year-old Tawan Kedkong, from Thailand.

== Auditions ==
Casting calls were held in three countries, listed below;

- September 20 at JW Marriott Hotel Jakarta, Jakarta
- October 3 at Space Convention Centre, Bangkok

Contestants were also encouraged to apply for the competition online if they were unable to make an appearance at the live auditions.

== Cast ==
=== Contestants ===
(Ages stated are at start of contest)

Country	Contestant	Age	Height	Finish	Place
Thailand	Wanvisa 'Maya' Goldman	22	1.73 m (5 ft 8 in)	Episode 1	14
Mongolia	Adina 'Tugs' Saruul	24	1.80 m (5 ft 11 in)	Episode 2	13
Vietnam	Mai Ngô (Note: Mai Ngo previously participated in the fourth cycle of Vietnam's Next Top Model, where she placed eighteenth to fifteenth.)	20	1.73 m (5 ft 8 in)	Episode 3	12
Philippines	Gwendoline 'Gwen' Ruais	26	1.80 m (5 ft 11 in)	Episode 4	11
Philippines	Alaiza Malinao	21	1.73 m (5 ft 8 in)	Episode 4	10 (quit)
Hong Kong	Jessica Lam	21	1.76 m (5 ft 9 1/2 in)	Episode 5	9
Indonesia	Aldilla Zahraa	23	1.73 m (5 ft 8 in)	Episode 6	8
Myanmar	That 'May' Htet Aung	17	1.74 m (5 ft 8 1/2 in)	Episode 7	7
Malaysia	Nuraini 'Tuti' Noor	24	1.75 m (5 ft 9 in)	Episode 9	6
Singapore	Angela 'Angie' Watkins	19	1.74 m (5 ft 8 1/2 in)	Episode 10	5
Philippines	Julian Flores	25	1.74 m (5 ft 8 1/2 in)	Episode 12	4
South Korea	Sang-in Kim	23	1.76 m (5 ft 9 1/2 in)	Episode 13	3–2
Indonesia	Patricia Gunawan	25	1.68 m (5 ft 6 in)	Episode 13	3–2
Thailand	Jiratchaya 'Tawan' Kedkong	20	1.77 m (5 ft 9 1/2 in)	Episode 13	1

=== Judges ===
- Cindy Bishop (host)
- Kelly Tandiono
- Yu Tsai

== Episodes ==
No. overall	No. in season	Title	Original release date
40	1	"The Girl Who Had No Bed"	9 March 2016
The fourteen finalists converged at the Singapore Sports Hub in Kallang, and after being introduced to the judges, had a challenge on a sloping runway. The winner of the challenge was revealed to be Patricia, with Maya being eliminated for having received the lowest score. The models later had a mod-themed photo shoot inspired by a Melvin Sokolsky editorial in Harper's Bazaar. At panel, Gwen was eliminated when she landed in the bottom two with Angie, but was allowed to remain in the competition.: Featured photographer: BJ Pascual; Special guest: Kenneth Goh
41	2	"The Girl Who Bounced Back"	16 March 2016
The contestants were taken to a trampoline park for a training session and challenge with Derrick Siu, won by Angie, where Jessica was left unable to participate after an ankle injury. They later had a photo shoot in which they had to pose gracefully in mid-air while jumping on a trampoline. At elimination, Jessica and Tugs landed in the bottom two. In spite of not having received a challenge score, Jessica managed to remain in the competition, and Tugs became the second contestant to leave the competition.: Featured photographer: BJ Pascual; Special guest: Derrick Siu
42	3	"The Girl Who Got Cut"	23 March 2016
The remaining 12 contestants received makeovers, and later had a simplistic photo shoot with photographer Joel Lim in which they had to have multiple photos taken in order to create their first professional comp cards. At elimination, Mai Ngo was chosen as the third contestant to leave the competition.: Featured photographer: Joel Lim; Special guests: Kenneth Goh, Lourd Ramos, Mervin Wee
43	4	"The Girl Who Crashed And Burned"	30 March 2016
The contestants had a session of paddle board yoga with Nicole Chung, and took on a challenge, won by Angie, in which they had to replicate Nicole's yoga poses on a surfboard while floating in the water. The models were later introduced to the CEO of Subaru, Glenn Tan, and former contestants Natalie Pickles and Monika Sta. Maria in time for a photo shoot in which they had to wear gowns whilst posing with a Subaru. At panel, Tawan was granted immunity for the next elimination for having received the highest score. Gwen and Aldilla were both eliminated from the competition after landing in the bottom three with Sang In, but in a dramatic turn of events, Aldilla was allowed to stay after Alaiza decided to quit the competition.: Featured photographer: Nat Prakobsantisuk; Special guests: Daniel Boey, Glenn Tan, Monika Sta. Maria, Natalie Pickles, Nicole Chung
44	5	"The Girl Who Went To The Big Apple"	6 April 2016
The contestants were taken to the Bugis+ shopping mall for a challenge in which they were asked to hold a pose for 30 minutes while they were styled by Thai fashion sensation Madaew (Apichet Atilattana), where Sang In was chosen as the winner. They were later taken to Universal Studios Singapore as part of a group photo shoot for Maybelline in which they had to pose together as New York 'it girls'. At panel, Jessica became the sixth contestant to leave the competition.: Featured photographer: Jesper McIlroy; Special guests: Madaew, Nigel Stanislaus, Patricia Field
45	6	"The Girl Who Fell Overboard"	13 April 2016
The contestants were introduced to Zalora representative Meghna Mistry, and had a styling lesson and challenge centered around different color palettes where Tawan, Tuti, Julian and Aldilla were singled out as the best performers, with Tuti being chosen as the overall winner. They later had a photo shoot for Zalora on board a yacht as it traveled down the Singapore River. At elimination, Aldilla became the seventh contestant to leave the competition.: Featured photographer: Joel Lim; Special guests: Meghna Mistry, Daniel Boey
46	7	"The Girl With The Diamond Smile"	20 April 2016
The contestants were taken to the offices of Fox International Channels and Star World for a workshop on mastering different kinds of smiles before taking on an acting challenge with Filipino actor Tom Rodriguez, where Patricia was chosen as the winner. They later had a beauty photo shoot for Close-up alongside Indonesian model and actor Mike Lewis, and at elimination, May became the eighth contestant to leave the competition.: Featured photographer: Jerry Aurum; Special guests: Tom Rodriguez, Mike Lewis
47	8	"The Girl Who Drove Into The Spotlight"	27 April 2016
The contestants had a go-sees challenge with several clients around the city in teams of two, in which Angie was chosen as the winner. They later had to shoot a music video campaign for the new Subaru XV, under the watchful eye of the CEO of Subaru, Glenn Tan. At panel, Tuti was eliminated when she landed in the bottom two with Sang In, but was allowed to remain in the competition.: Featured director: Kevin Ou; Special guests: Pevita Pearce, Chelsea Scott-Blackhall, Zenchi, Daniel Boey, Glenn Tan
48	9	"The Girl Who Sank Without A Trace"	4 May 2016
The contestants met fitness trainers Amirrudin Ong and Desmond Yeo for a workout and runway challenge at the ITE College East campus, where Tuti was deemed to be the best performer. They later met cycle three contestant Aimee Cheng-Bradshaw at a photo shoot for Neutrogena in which they were splashed with water, and had to embody the essence of some of the brand's products. At elimination, Tuti became the ninth contestant to leave the competition.: Featured photographer: Chan Wai Teik; Special guests: Amirrudin Ong, Desmond Yeo, Vincent Quek, Kenneth Goh, Aimee Cheng-Bradshaw
49	10	"The Girl Who Tripped And Fell"	11 May 2016
The remaining five contestants received a runway workshop in preparation for an upcoming challenge and photo shoot for TRESemmé, in which they had to walk down the runway and strike a pose at the end of the catwalk, with the results later being evaluated at panel. Julian was deemed as the best performer on the runway, and at elimination, Angie became the tenth contestant to leave the competition.: Featured photographer: Nat Prakobsantisuk; Special guests: Mervin Wee, Jing Monis, Georgina Wilson
50	11	"The Girl Who Had It Covered"	18 May 2016
The contestants met social media expert Nicole Warne for tips on how to manage their Instagram accounts to increase their popularity. They later had a challenge in which they had to create video campaigns and photo montages of Sentosa Island, where Sang In was chosen as the winner. On set, the models were styled in designer labels for a mock cover photo shoot in Harper's Bazaar, for which they had to convey specific themes. At elimination, Patricia and Sang In received a joint first call-out. Julian and Tawan landed in the bottom two, but the episode ended in a cliffhanger, and the elimination was postponed until the following episode.: Featured photographer: Yu Tsai; Special guests: Nicole Warne, Tay Cheng Cheng, Tiesto, Kenneth Goh, Kate Upton (video message)
51	12	"The Girl On The Road To The Grand Finale"	25 May 2016
The episode's previous elimination resumed, with Julian becoming the eleventh contestant to be eliminated, leaving Patricia, Sang In, and Tawan as the cycle's three remaining finalists. Much of the remaining episode was edited in the nature of a recap episode, with commentaries from the judges and the finalists intertwining between the scenes. The contestants were also interviewed by the editor-in-chief of Harper's Bazaar Singapore, Kenneth Goh, and received a surprise visit from some unexpected guests.
52	13	"The Girl Who Walked Away with Everything"	1 June 2016
The finalists were visited by friends and family members before being treated to a day off from the competition. They later had a final composite photo shoot with photographer Joel Lim, in which they had to wear avant-garde designs by Filipino designer Happy Andrada. Afterwards, the models were rushed to the location of their final runway show, where they reunited with some of the previously eliminated contestants, wearing designs by Tex Saverio and Rajo Laurel. After the final deliberation, Tawan was crowned the fourth winner of Asia's Next Top Model.: Featured photographer: Joel Lim; Special guests: Kenneth Goh, Miss J. Alexander, Katie Atkins, Priscilla I'Anson, Daniel Boey, Jessica Amornkuldilok, Sheena Liam, Ayu Gani

== Results ==
Order	Episodes											
Order	1 (Note: In episode 1, Maya was eliminated for having the lowest challenge score. Gwen was originally eliminated from the competition but was saved due to Maya's elimination earlier in the episode.) (Note: In episode 1, Tugs was called before Jessica during the elimination ceremony, despite the fact that she had a lower score, possibly due to an editing mistake with the scores displayed during the episode.)	2	3	4 (Note: In episode 4, Aldilla, Gwen and Sang In landed in the bottom three. Gwen was the first contestant to be eliminated, followed by Aldilla. Alaiza decided to quit the competition immediately after Aldilla's elimination, saving Aldilla from elimination.)	5 (Note: In episode 5, Tawan was immune from elimination for having received the highest score in the previous episode.)	6	7	8 (Note: In episode 8, Tuti was originally eliminated, but was saved.)	9	10	12 (Note: In episode 11, Patricia was called first for having the highest score. Sang In was called next, but it was revealed that she had tied with Patricia for the best performance. Julian and Tawan landed in the bottom two. The episode ended in a cliffhanger and their fate remained unknown until the following episode. At the beginning of episode 12, it was revealed that Julian was eliminated from the competition. No other elimination took place. Instead, the episode covered conversations of the girls with Kenneth Goh and their journey to the final three.)	13
1	Tuti	Angie	Sang In	Tawan	May	Sang In	Patricia	Patricia	Sang In	Julian	Patricia; Sang In	Tawan
2	Aldilla	Mai	Tuti	Angie	Sang In	Tuti	Tawan	Angie	Julian	Tawan	Patricia; Sang In	Patricia; Sang In
3	Alaiza	Julian	Patricia	Alaiza	Patricia	Tawan	Angie	Tawan	Patricia	Patricia	Tawan	Patricia; Sang In
4	Patricia	Alaiza	Angie	Patricia	Tuti	May	Julian	Julian	Angie	Sang In	Julian	
5	Julian	Sang In	Jessica	Tuti	Tawan	Angie	Sang In	Sang In	Tawan	Angie		
6	May	May	Tawan	Julian	Angie	Patricia	Tuti	Tuti	Tuti			
7	Mai	Tuti	Aldilla	May	Aldilla	Julian	May					
8	Sang In	Tawan	May	Jessica	Julian	Aldilla						
9	Tawan	Aldilla	Julian	Sang In	Jessica							
10	Tugs	Patricia	Alaiza	Aldilla								
11	Jessica	Gwen	Gwen	Gwen								
12	Angie	Jessica	Mai									
13	Gwen	Tugs										
14	Maya											

The contestant was eliminated outside of judging panel
The contestant was eliminated but was saved
The contestant was eliminated
The contestant quit the competition
The contestant was immune from elimination
The contestant won the competition

=== Scores ===
(Total and average scores on the table only reflect scores calculated from the full sets added during panel)

Place	Model	Episodes												Total score	Average
Place	Model	1	2	3	4	5	6	7	8	9	10	12	13	Total score	Average
1	Tawan	25.3	24.8	28.5	46.0	36.0	31.8	40.0	42.3	33.0	38.3	41.5	WIN	387.5	35.22
2-3	Patricia	31.5	20.8	27.0	34.0	39.5	25.0	47.5	46.0	38.8	38.0	43.0	OUT	391.1	35.55
2-3	Sang In	26.3	27.0	40.0	20.0	46.5	36.5	37.0	30.0	45.3	35.3	43.0	OUT	386.9	35.17
4	Julian	30.7	34.5	25.0	33.0	30.0	24.8	38.5	39.3	43.5	46.8	40.0		386.1	35.10
5	Angie	18.0	38.8	32.7	45.0	31.3	27.5	39.5	45.5	33.5	31.0			342.8	34.28
6	Tuti	37.5	26.0	37.0	34.0	37.7	34.0	31.0	29.0	32.0				298.2	33.13
7	May	29.2	26.0	25.5	31.0	48.0	28.5	30.0						218.2	31.17
8	Aldilla	33.2	23.1	36.5	19.0	30.5	24.3							166.6	27.76
9	Jessica	19.0	16.0	30.1	28.0	23.0								116.1	23.22
10	Alaiza	32.5	31.0	23.5	35.0									122.0	30.50
11	Gwen	17.3	20.3	22.0	15.0									74.6	18.65
12	Mai Ngô	27.5	35.0	18.0										80.5	26.83
13	Tugs	18.5	13.0											31.5	15.75
14	Maya	3.3												3.3	3.3

Indicates the contestant had the highest score that week
Indicates the contestant was in the bottom that week
Indicates the contestant was immune from elimination that week
Indicates the contestant was originally eliminated that week, but was saved
Indicates the contestant was eliminated outside of judging panel that week
Indicates the contestant was eliminated that week
Indicates the contestant quit the competition that week
Indicates the contestant won the competition
