= Asia's Next Top Model season 6 =

Asia's Next Top Model
- Season 6
- Judges: Cindy Bishop; Yu Tsai
- No. of contestants: 14
- Winner: Dana Slosar
- Runners-up: Adela Marshall; Mia Sabathy
- No. of episodes: 10

Release
- Original network: Fox Life
- Original release: August 22 – October 24, 2018

Season chronology
- ← Previous; Season 5

The sixth and final cycle of Asia's Next Top Model (subtitled as Asia's Next Top Model 6: Beyond Limits) premiered on August 22, 2018. Filming for the cycle took place in Bangkok, Thailand. Cindy Bishop and Yu Tsai both returned as judges for panel, while Monika Sta. Maria from cycle 3 alongside Shikin Gomez and Nguyen Minh Tu from cycle 5 made appearances as model mentors throughout the cycle.

The cycle featured 14 contestants: three from Thailand, two from Indonesia and the Philippines, and one each from Hong Kong, Japan, Malaysia, Myanmar, Singapore, Taiwan and Vietnam. China, India, Mongolia, Nepal, and South Korea were unrepresented. Japan marked its comeback after its absences from the previous two cycles, while both Hong Kong and Myanmar returned after their absences from the previous cycle.

The prize package for this cycle included a Subaru XV, a cover and fashion spread in Harper's Bazaar Thailand, a featured avatar in the new America's Next Top Model Mobile Game, and a modeling contract with Storm Model Management in London.

The winner of the competition was 23 year-old Dana Slosar, from Thailand.

== Cast ==
=== Contestants ===
(Ages stated are at start of contest)

Country	Contestant	Age	Height	Mentor	Finish	Place
Thailand	Saranratch 'Lena' Saetiao	20	1.73 m (5 ft 8 in)	—N/a	Episode 1	14–13
Hong Kong	Hody Yim	23	1.70 m (5 ft 7 in)	—N/a	Episode 1	14–13
Japan	Sharnie Fenn	20	1.70 m (5 ft 7 in)	Shikin	Episode 1	12
Indonesia	Rizkho 'Iko' Bustomi	22	1.73 m (5 ft 8 in)	Monika	Episode 2	11
Indonesia	Jesslyn Lim	26	1.78 m (5 ft 10 in)	Monika	Episode 3	10
Malaysia	Rubini Sambanthan	26	1.75 m (5 ft 9 in)	Monika	Episode 4	9
Singapore	Yi Han Si	18	1.80 m (5 ft 11 in)	Minh Tu	Episode 5	8
Philippines	Jachin Manere	21	1.75 m (5 ft 9 in)	Shikin	Episode 6	7
Vietnam	Thanh Vy Nguyen	23	1.68 m (5 ft 6 in)	Shikin	Episode 7	6
Thailand	Pim Bubear	23	1.73 m (5 ft 8 in)	Minh Tu/Monika^{4}	Episode 8	5
Myanmar	Thet Thet 'Beauty' Thinn	22	1.76 m (5 ft 9 1/2 in)	Minh Tu	Episode 8	4
Taiwan	Mia Sabathy^{1}	24	1.79 m (5 ft 10 1/2 in)	Shikin	Episode 10	3–2
Philippines	Adela-Mae Marshall^{2}	20	1.73 m (5 ft 8 in)	Minh Tu	Episode 10	3–2
Thailand	Dana Slosar	23	1.75 m (5 ft 9 in)	Monika	Episode 10	1

=== Judges ===
- Cindy Bishop (host)
- Yu Tsai

=== Other cast members ===
- Monika Sta. Maria – Alumni Model Mentor
- Shikin Gomez – Alumni Model Mentor
- Nguyen Minh Tu – Alumni Model Mentor

== Episodes ==
No. overall	No. in season	Title	Original release date
66	1	"The Girl Who Can't Scream"	22 August 2018
The models were introduced to the show's returning alumni mentors, Shikin, Minh Tu and Monika, before meeting host Cindy Bishop at the rooftop of the Bangkok Marriott hotel. They were immediately sent on their first challenge, which came in the form of a colorful selfie runway show at the Chatuchak Weekend Market. Hody and Lena were deemed to be the worst performers during the challenge, and were both eliminated from the competition. The remaining 12 contestants moved into the model house, and were divided into groups to be mentored by the alumni models. The contestants later took part in a tribal jewelry photo shoot with reptiles. At elimination, Beauty received the highest overall score. Jesslyn and Sharnie landed in the bottom two, and Sharnie was eliminated from the competition.: Featured photographer: Tim Punsiri; Special guests: Celina Jade
67	2	"The Girl Who Had Two Chances"	29 August 2018
The remaining 11 contestants received makeovers at the Ketvadi Gandini salon. Tension ensued in the model house after several of the girls found some of Mia's notes that she had written about the other contestants. On set, the models were paired up as black and white swans for an editorial photo shoot inspired by Pyotr Ilyich Tchaikovsky's world famous ballet, Swan Lake. At elimination, Jachin received the highest overall score. Iko and Jesslyn landed in the bottom two, and Iko was eliminated from the competition.: Featured photographer: Yu Tsai; Special guests: Saisuda Chuawiwat, Marion Caunter
68	3	"The Girl Who Found Her Perfect Companion"	5 September 2018
The models were introduced to cycle 5 winner and Subaru ambassador Maureen Wroblewitz, who informed the contestants that they would be divided into teams for a Subaru social media 'insta-race'. The timed challenge consisted of travelling to three separate locations in Bangkok (Khlong Toei Market, Hua Lamphong station, Rama VIII Bridge) to take Instagram photos that embodied the brand's spirit of adventure. Jachin, Pim, and Thanh Vy were later chosen as the winners. For the photo shoot, the models were taken to a luxury villa in Bangkok, where they had to pose with dogs in a campaign for Subaru. At elimination, Mia received the highest overall score. Dana and Jesslyn landed in the bottom two, and Jesslyn was eliminated from the competition.: Featured photographer: Shavonne Wong; Special guests: Maureen Wroblewitz, Glenn Tan, Vatanika Patamasingha
69	4	"The Girl Who Got The Kicks"	12 September 2018
The remaining nine contestants received pep talks from their mentors before being taken to Absolute You Yoga Studio for a rhythm cycling challenge in groups, which consisted of performing a choreographed dance-exercise routine. The winning group, consisting of Adela, Jachin, and Mia, received a day off at Quan Spa. On set, the models took part in an 80s inspired wrestling photo shoot where they had to pose in pairs. At elimination, Adela received the highest overall score. Han and Rubini landed in the bottom two, and Rubini was eliminated from the competition.: Featured photographer: Pratch Siridhara; Special guests: Pearl Kirati, Maria Ehren
70	5	"The Girl Who Spoke The Truth"	19 September 2018
Pim was switched from team Tu to team Monika at the beginning of the episode. The contestants later met former judge and mentor Cara G. McIlroy to prepare to take part in a screen test challenge for award-winning skincare brand Estetica ést.lab. Adela was chosen as the best performer, winning a $1,000 worth of the brands products. The models later had a natural beauty photo shoot for Estetica. At elimination, Dana received the highest overall score. Han and Mia landed in the bottom two, and Han was eliminated from the competition.: Featured photographer: Pratch Siridhara; Special guests: Jesseca Liu
71	6	"The Girl Who Can Barely Stand Up"	26 September 2018
The remaining seven contestants were divided into teams for a roller derby challenge at the Roller Dome Emporium, where Adela, Beauty, Dana, and Jachin were chosen as the winners. On set, the models had to perform in a supermarket editorial pop-up photo shoot alongside their model mentors, Monika, Shikin, and Tu. At elimination, Beauty received the highest overall score. Jachin and Thanh Vy landed in the bottom two, and Jachin was eliminated from the competition, much to the surprise of the other contestants.: Featured photographer: Tim Punsiri; Special guests: Lara Irons, Jessica Iskandar
72	7	"The Girl Who's Out of Time"	3 October 2018
The remaining contestants discussed the implications of the previous panel's elimination, and received a visit from their model mentors, who informed them that the teams would be dissolved at the end of the week. They later had a styling and photo shoot challenge in teams in which they had to create a lookbook collection with three different briefs (uptown, casual, modern) taking selfies with a Huawei P20 Pro phone. The winners of the challenge, Adela, Beauty, and Dana, received an additional 5 minutes at the upcoming photo shoot - a fashion story for Harper's Bazaar Thailand where the contestants had to pose as fashionable giants in modern pin-up styling on a miniature set. At elimination, Dana received the highest overall score. Mia and Thanh Vy landed in the bottom two, and Thanh Vy was eliminated from the competition.: Featured photographer: Waroon Kieattisin; Special guests: Priscilla I'Anson, Duang Poshyanonda
73	8	"The Girl Who is Left Hanging"	10 October 2018
The 5 remaining contestants did not have a challenge but instead were taken to their photoshoot in a garage where the Subaru car is hanging and that they have to model with. After the photoshoot, they had a Subaru videoshoot. At panel, Adela, Beauty, and Pim landed in the bottom three. Beauty and Pim were eliminated from the competition.: Featured photographer: Joel Lim; Special guests: Hồ Ngọc Hà
74	9	"The Girl Who Climbed Her Way to the Top"	17 October 2018
This is a recap episode from week 1 to 8 of the cycle.
75	10	"The Girl Who Had A Rollercoaster Ride"	24 October 2018
With the final goal of their journey within arm's reach, the top three girls must channel the confidence of their inner supermodel in a Celebration photoshoot with their special surprise co-stars, and walk the walk in a colourful tropical finale runway, Paradiso. After the final deliberation, Dana was crowned as the sixth winner of Asia's Next Top Model.: Featured photographer: Yu Tsai; Special guests: Glenn Tan, Ruby Adler, Duang Poshyanonda, Pia Wurtzbach

== Results ==
Order	Episodes								
Order	1^{3}	2	3	4	5	6	7	8	10
1	Beauty	Jachin	Mia	Adela	Dana	Beauty	Dana	Mia	Dana
2	Mia	Adela	Vy	Mia	Jachin	Dana	Beauty	Dana	Adela; Mia
3	Rubini	Pim	Pim	Beauty	Vy	Adela	Pim	Adela	Adela; Mia
4	Jachin	Dana	Adela	Pim	Adela	Mia	Adela	Beauty	
5	Dana	Vy	Rubini	Jachin	Pim	Pim	Mia	Pim	
6	Iko	Mia	Han	Dana	Beauty	Vy	Vy		
7	Adela	Han	Jachin	Vy	Mia	Jachin			
8	Vy	Beauty	Beauty	Han	Han				
9	Han	Rubini	Dana	Rubini					
10	Pim	Jesslyn	Jesslyn						
11	Jesslyn	Iko							
12	Sharnie								
13	Lena; Hody								
14	Lena; Hody								

The contestant was eliminated
The contestant was eliminated outside of judging panel
The contestant won the competition

=== Scores ===
Team Monika	Team Shikin	Team Minh Tu

Place	Model	Episodes									Total Score	Average
Place	Model	1	2	3	4	5	6	7	8	10	Total Score	Average
1	Dana	33.0	24.5	33.1	32.0	35.8	26.5	35.2	33.0	WIN	253.1	31.64
2-3	Adela	32.4	28.0	40.0	36.8	31.0	25.8	30.7	28.2	OUT	252.9	31.61
2-3	Mia	33.9	23.3	43.5	34.3	27.2	25.5	27.7	34.0	OUT	249.4	31.18
4	Beauty	34.0	20.0	33.6	34.0	28.0	28.0	34.2	28.0		239.8	29.98
5	Pim	32.2	26.0	42.5	33.7	30.5	22.0	31.7	27.5		246.1	30.76
6	Vy	32.4	24.5	43.0	31.0	33.6	21.5	25.7			211.7	30.24
7	Jachin	33.4	28.8	36.5	33.3	34.9	19.5				186.4	31.07
8	Han	32.4	23.0	37.0	27.2	26.5					146.1	29.2
9	Rubini	33.8	19.0	39.1	26.7						118.6	29.7
10	Jesslyn	31.7	17.5	32.5							81.7	27.2
11	Iko	32.9	16.5								49.4	24.7
12	Sharnie	30.1									30.1	30.1
13–14	Hody	OUT									—N/a	—N/a
13–14	Lena	OUT									—N/a	—N/a

Indicates the contestant had the highest score that week
Indicates the contestant was in the bottom that week
Indicates the contestant was eliminated that week
Indicates the contestant was eliminated outside the judging panel

== Notes ==
1. Adela competed on the second cycle of Philippines' Next Top Model, where she was the runner-up.
2. Mia competed on the seventh cycle of Austria's Next Topmodel, where she placed third.
3. In episode 1, Hody and Lena were eliminated outside of judging panel following their poor performance for that week's runway challenge. They received no challenge score, and did not take part in that week's photo shoot. At the main elimination, Adela, Vy and Han had a tied score but were called individually.
4. In episode 5, Pim was switched from Team Tu to Team Monika.
