= Asia's Next Top Model season 3 =

Asia's Next Top Model
- Season 3
- Season 3 cast
- Judges: Georgina Wilson; Joey Mead King; Alex Perry
- No. of contestants: 14
- Winner: Ayu Gani
- Runner-up: Monika Sta. Maria
- No. of episodes: 13

Release
- Original network: STAR World
- Original release: March 25 – June 17, 2015

Season chronology
- ← Previous; Season 2 Next → Season 4

The third cycle of Asia's Next Top Model aired from March to June 2015. Nadya Hutagalung confirmed that she would not be returning for cycle three. She was replaced by Filipino model and TV personality Georgina Wilson. Joey Mead-King returned to the judging panel for the third time, while Australia's Next Top Model judge and fashion designer Alex Perry also joined the show as a new judge.

The cycle featured 14 contestants, three from Indonesia and the Philippines, two from Hong Kong and Malaysia, and one each from Japan, Singapore, Thailand and Vietnam. Nepal was once again unrepresented. China, India, South Korea, and Taiwan were also not represented this cycle. The show was filmed in Singapore once again.

The prize package for this cycle included a brand new Subaru XV STI, the chance of becoming the new face of TRESemmé for one of their 2015 campaigns, the chance to appear in a spread and on the cover of Harper's Bazaar Singapore and a modeling contract with Storm Model Management in London.

The winner of the competition was 23-year-old Ayu Gani, from Indonesia.

== Auditions ==
Casting calls were held in three countries, listed below:

- October 4 & 5 at Resorts World Manila, Manila
- October 10 at JW Marriott, Jakarta
- October 11 at ION Sky Level 56, ION Orchard, Singapore City

Contestants were also encouraged to apply for the competition online if they were unable to make an appearance at the live auditions.

== Cast ==
=== Contestants ===
(Ages stated are at start of contest)

Country	Contestant	Age	Height	Finish	Place
Malaysia	Shareeta Selvaraj	24	1.68 m (5 ft 6 in)	Episode 1	14
Thailand	Kiana Guyon	20	1.70 m (5 ft 7 in)	Episode 2	13
Indonesia	Rani Ramadhany	20	1.73 m (5 ft 8 in)	Episode 3	12
Hong Kong	Lorretta Chow	26	1.79 m (5 ft 10 1/2 in)	Episode 4	11–10
Vietnam	Thuy Vi 'Celine' Duong	18	1.74 m (5 ft 8 1/2 in)	Episode 4	11–10
Philippines	Franchesca Lagua	23	1.72 m (5 ft 7 1/2 in)	Episode 5	9
Malaysia	Melissa Tan	27	1.73 m (5 ft 8 in)	Episode 7	8
Hong Kong	Kirsteen 'KB' Barlow	25	1.71 m (5 ft 7 1/2 in)	Episode 8	7
Indonesia	Tahlia Raji	18	1.73 m (5 ft 8 in)	Episode 9	6
Philippines	Amanda Chan	17	1.76 m (5 ft 9 1/2 in)	Episode 11	5
Japan	Akemi 'Barbara' Katsuki	27	1.73 m (5 ft 8 in)	Episode 12	4
Singapore	Aimee Cheng-Bradshaw	19	1.75 m (5 ft 9 in)	Episode 13	3
Philippines	Monika Sta. Maria	23	1.77 m (5 ft 9 1/2 in)	Episode 13	2
Indonesia	Ayu Gani	23	1.73 m (5 ft 8 in)	Episode 13	1

=== Judges ===
- Georgina Wilson (host)
- Joey Mead King
- Alex Perry

== Episodes ==
No. overall	No. in season	Title	Original release date
27	1	"The Girl in a Spin"	25 March 2015
The 14 finalists moved into the model home before meeting host Georgina Wilson and Joey Mead-King for an evaluation of their runway walks. They later had a turntable runway challenge under the watchful eye of model agent Marina Fairfax, where Barbara was chosen as the winner. For the photo shoot, the models were photographed amidst a jungle setting wearing high-end swimwear. At elimination, Amanda received best photo, Celine and Shareeta landed in the bottom two, and Shareeta became the first contestant to be sent home.: Featured photographer: Mike Rosenthal; Special guests: Marina Fairfax, Kenneth Goh
28	2	"The Girl with K-POP Fever"	1 April 2015
The contestants had a brief styling lesson before practicing a choreography for the newest single of the K-POP group, Tahiti. They later performed in had a flash mob for tourists in Clarke Quay, where Aimee, Franchesca, and Melissa were chosen as the winners. For the photo shoot, the models were divided into separate teams and had to pose as musical groups whilst embodying a specific style. At elimination, Melissa, Celine, and Gani received a joint first call-out, Aimee, Amanda and Kiana landed in the bottom three, and Kiana was chosen as the second contestant to leave the competition.: Featured photographer: Mike Rosenthal; Special guests: Wil Sabin, Ha Sang Beg, Tahiti (in a video message)
29	3	"The Girl Who Dreads a Makeover"	8 April 2015
The remaining 12 contestants received makeovers, and had a jewelry photo shoot with photographer Olaf Mueller for Temptations Jewelry. At elimination, Aimee received best photo, Lorretta and Rani landed in the bottom two, and Rani became the third contestant to leave the competition.: Featured photographer: Olaf Mueller; Special guests: Lourd Ramos, Dr. Kwan
30	4	"The Girl with a Broken Heart"	15 April 2015
The contestants took part in a challenge, won by Lorretta, where the goal was to re-create makeup looks based on trends of the spring/summer 2015 season. They later had a romantic photo shoot at Manhattan Bar with model William Highwind, wearing designs by Peter Som. At panel, Monika received best photo, Celine, Franchesca and Lorretta landed in the bottom three, and both Celine and Lorretta left the competition in a surprise double elimination.: Featured photographer: Amanda Lim; Special guests: Beno Lim, Peter Som, William Highwind
31	5	"The Girl with a Killer Smile"	22 April 2015
The contestants attended a workshop that taught them how to master a picture-perfect smile, and later had an acting class with Indonesian TV Personality Daniel Mananta in preparation for a challenge, won by Barbara, where they had to win over strangers with their smiles to convince them to take a selfie. At the photo shoot, the models had to pose in a mock advertising campaign for Closeup Diamond Attraction. At elimination, Monika received best photo for the second consecutive week, Amanda and Franchesca landed in the bottom two, and Franchesca became the sixth contestant to leave the competition: Featured photographer: Mike Rosenthal; Special guests: Dr. Cecile Infantado, Daniel Mananta
32	6	"The Girl Who Ran Out of Luck"	29 April 2015
The remaining contestants were driven to Kyō, where they met Joey Mead-King and the fashion director of Zalora Meghna Mistry, for a timed styling challenge which was won by Tahlia. As part of her prize, she was allowed to steal five minutes from Monika's session at the upcoming photo shoot, which involved being photographed with multiple outfit changes in a lookbook for Zalora. At elimination, Gani received best photo, while Barbara and Monika were both allowed to remain in the competition after landing in the bottom two. As a punishment however, they were given only ten frames for the next photo shoot.: Featured photographer: Joel Lim; Special guest: Meghna Mistry
33	7	"The Girl Who Finally Cracks"	6 May 2015
The contestants had a posing challenge in which Melissa was deemed to be the best performer. They were later introduced to the CEO of Subaru, Glenn Tan, and former contestants Jodilly Pendre and Natalie Pickles in time for a photo shoot in which they had to pose alongside a Subaru whilst wearing nothing but body paint. At elimination, Monika received best photo, Melissa and Tahlia landed in the bottom two, and Melissa became the seventh contestant to leave the competition.: Featured photographer: Jesper McIlroy; Special guests: Cara Grogan-McIlroy, Glenn Tan, Jodilly Pendre, Natalie Pickles
34	8	"The Girl on a Mission"	13 May 2015
The contestants took part in a timed challenge to recreate the latest runway hair trends of the season with products from TRESemmé, where Monika was chosen as the winner, and was granted immunity from the upcoming elimination. Host Georgina Wilson later paid the models a visit, and had a talk with Tahlia regarding her breast cancer scare earlier in the episode. At the photo shoot, the contestants were styled with designs by Rajo Laurel in a mock campaign for TRESemmé. At elimination, Tahlia received best photo, Amanda and KB landed in the bottom two, and KB became the eighth contestant to leave the competition.: Featured photographer: Jez Smith; Special guests: Giovanni Wihayak, Andien Aisyah
35	9	"The Girl Who Flew To The Top"	20 May 2015
The contestants had a sparring session with Brazilian jiu-jitsu World Champion, Bruno Pucci and ONE Fighting Championship Vice President, Rich Franklin. They later had an MMA challenge with Ming Leong, which was won by Barbara. For the photo shoot, the models were suspended in the air while wearing Alex Perry gowns. At elimination, Amanda received best photo, Gani and Tahlia landed in the bottom two, and Tahlia became the ninth contestant to leave the competition.: Featured photographer: Jez Smith; Special guests: Bruno Pucci, Rich Franklin, Ming Leong, Kenneth Goh
36	10	"The Girl in the Driver's Seat"	27 May 2015
The remaining five contestants were taken to the Port of Singapore and boarded the Mariner of the Seas, where it was revealed that the four contestants who made it past the week's elimination would be travelling on the ship for the next leg of the competition. The models then had a timed catwalk challenge, won by Aimee, and later had to shoot a motion editorial for the Subaru Forester with Peter Wery as their director. At elimination, Monika received best photo. Amanda and Barbara landed in the bottom two, but the episode ended in a cliffhanger, and the elimination was postponed until the following episode.: Featured director: Peter Wery; Special guests: Ken Jones, Farah Quinn, Glenn Tan
37	11	"The Final Four Revealed"	3 June 2015
The episode's previous elimination resumed, with Amanda becoming the tenth contestant to be eliminated. The remaining contestants went on the cruise, and later reminisced about moments in the competition before having one-on-one conversations with Joey Mead-King and Georgina Wilson regarding their individual journeys on the show.: Special guest: Ken Jones
38	12	"The Cover Girl"	10 June 2015
The final four moved into their new home at Villa Du Jardin, and later had a go-sees challenge with clients from POIS, Braun Büffel and Triumph, where Barbara and Monika were deemed to be the best performers. On set, the contestants had to pose in a mock cover photo shoot for Harper's Bazaar, with each model embodying a different decade. At elimination, Barbara became the eleventh contestant to be eliminated, leaving Aimee, Gani, and Monika as the three remaining finalists.: Featured photographer: Elvina Farkas; Special guests: Liv Lo, Windy Aulia, Kenneth Goh, Damiano Biella, Kate Ang
39	13	"The Girl on Top"	17 June 2015
The final three had a final couture photo shoot in front of the Fullerton Hotel, and later took part in a final runway show at CHIJMES hall alongside some of the previously eliminated contestants. After reviewing all of the material throughout the cycle and sitting down for a final deliberation, Gani was crowned as the third winner of Asia's Next Top Model.: Featured photographer: Jean-Baptiste Fort; Special guests: Liv Lo, Daniel Mananta, Yvette King, Joel Lim, Kenneth Goh, Elvina Farkas, Sheena Liam, Janice Hermijanto, Poojaa Gill, Josephine Tan, Nicole Lee, Jodilly Pendre, Elektra Yu, Lourd Ramos, Sonya Davison, Nathan Toth

== Results ==
Order	Episodes											
Order	1	2 (Note: In episode 2, Celine, Gani and Melissa were collectively called first as a group. This episode also featured a bottom three, as opposed to the usual bottom two.)	3	4 (Note: In episode 4, Celine, Franchesca and Lorretta landed in the bottom three. Franchesca was deemed safe, leaving Celine and Lorretta in danger of elimination. Georgina handedly revealed a blank photo, eliminating both contestants from the competition.)	5	6 (Note: In episode 6, Barbara and Monika landed in the bottom two. Both of them were safe, but received a penalty for the next photo shoot.)	7	8 (Note: In episode 8, Monika was immune from elimination for winning that week's challenge.)	9	10 (Note: In episode 10, Amanda and Barbara landed in the bottom two. The episode ended in a cliffhanger and their fate remained unknown until the beginning of episode 11, where it was revealed that Amanda was eliminated from the competition. No other elimination took place. Instead, the episode covered one-on-one conversations of the girls with Georgina and their journey to the top four.)	12	13
1	Amanda	Celine; Gani; Melissa	Aimee	Monika	Monika	Gani	Monika	Tahlia	Amanda	Monika	Gani	Gani
2	Barbara	Celine; Gani; Melissa	Melissa	Aimee	Gani	Aimee	Barbara	Barbara	Monika	Aimee	Monika	Monika
3	Monika	Celine; Gani; Melissa	Monika	Amanda	Barbara	Melissa	KB	Gani	Barbara	Gani	Aimee	Aimee
4	Tahlia	Tahlia	Franchesca	KB	Melissa	KB	Gani	Aimee	Aimee	Barbara	Barbara	
5	Gani	Franchesca	Celine	Melissa	Aimee	Tahlia	Amanda	Monika	Gani	Amanda		
6	Aimee	Lorretta	Amanda	Tahlia	KB	Amanda	Aimee	Amanda	Tahlia			
7	Lorretta	KB	Gani	Gani	Tahlia	Barbara; Monika	Tahlia	KB				
8	KB	Barbara	Barbara	Barbara	Amanda	Barbara; Monika	Melissa					
9	Franchesca	Monika	Tahlia	Franchesca	Franchesca							
10	Melissa	Rani	KB	Celine; Lorretta								
11	Kiana	Aimee	Lorretta	Celine; Lorretta								
12	Rani	Amanda	Rani									
13	Celine	Kiana										
14	Shareeta											

The contestant was eliminated
The contestant was part of a non-elimination bottom two
The contestant won the challenge and was immune from elimination
The contestant won the competition
