= Asia's Next Top Model season 5 =

Asia's Next Top Model
- Season 5
- Judges: Cindy Bishop; Cara G. McIlroy; Yu Tsai; Pia Wurtzbach
- No. of contestants: 14
- Winner: Maureen Wroblewitz
- Runners-up: Minh Tu Nguyen; Shikin Gomez
- No. of episodes: 13

Release
- Original network: STAR World
- Original release: April 5 – June 28, 2017

Season chronology
- ← Previous; Season 4 Next → Season 6

The fifth cycle of Asia's Next Top Model (subtitled as Asia's Next Top Model 5: Expect The Unexpected) aired from April 5 to June 28, 2017. Filming for cycle five took place in Singapore and Malaysia. Cindy Bishop and Yu Tsai returned as judges for panel this cycle, while Kelly Tandiono departed from the show, and was replaced by Cara G. McIlroy.

The cycle featured 14 contestants: three each from Indonesia and the Philippines, two each from Malaysia, Singapore and Thailand, and one each from Taiwan and Vietnam. Cambodia, China, Hong Kong, India, Japan, Laos, Mongolia, Myanmar, Nepal, and South Korea were unrepresented. Taiwan marked its comeback after its absences from the two previous cycles.

The prize package for this cycle included a Subaru Impreza, a cover and fashion spread in Nylon Singapore, and a modeling contract with Storm Model Management in London.

The winner of the competition was 18 year-old Maureen Wroblewitz, from Philippines.

== Auditions ==
Casting calls were held in three countries, listed below:

- October 29 at Grand Caymans, Level 10, Sunway Resort Hotel and Spa, Kuala Lumpur
- November 5 at The Hermitage, A Tribute Portfolio Hotel, Jakarta

Contestants were also encouraged to apply for the competition online if they were unable to make an appearance at the live auditions.

== Cast ==
=== Contestants ===
(Ages stated are at start of contest)

Country	Contestant	Age	Height	Finish	Place
Philippines	Anjelica Santillan	22	176 cm (5 ft 9 1/2 in)	Episode 1	14
Thailand	Heidi Grods	25	178 cm (5 ft 10 in)	Episode 2	13
Philippines	Jennica Sanchez	20	168 cm (5 ft 6 in)	Episode 3	12
Singapore	Layla Ong	20	175 cm (5 ft 9 in)	Episode 4	11
Malaysia	Alicia Amin	22	175 cm (5 ft 9 in)	Episode 5	10
Singapore	Randhawa Nametha	18	178 cm (5 ft 10 in)	Episode 6	9 (DQ)
Indonesia	Valerie Krasnadewi (Note: Valerie and Veronika are twins; however, they competed individually.)	24	173 cm (5 ft 8 in)	Episode 7	8–7
Thailand	Dorothy Petzold	18	172 cm (5 ft 7 1/2 in)	Episode 7	8–7
Indonesia	Veronika Krasnasari	24	173 cm (5 ft 8 in)	Episode 8	6
Taiwan	Yong-shin "Cindy" Chen	19	178 cm (5 ft 10 in)	Episode 11	5
Indonesia	Clara Sutantio	21	170 cm (5 ft 7 in)	Episode 12	4
Malaysia	Nurfashikin 'Shikin' Gomez	24	177 cm (5 ft 9 1/2 in)	Episode 13	3–2
Vietnam	Minh Tu Nguyen	24	178 cm (5 ft 10 in)	Episode 13	3–2
Philippines	Maureen Wroblewitz	18	168 cm (5 ft 6 in)	Episode 13	1

=== Judges ===
- Cindy Bishop (host)
- Cara G. McIlroy
- Yu Tsai

== Episodes ==
No. overall	No. in season	Title	Original release date
53	1	"The Girl Who Got Up and Walked Again"	5 April 2017
The 14 finalists arrived in Singapore and were immediately put to the test with a daring lingerie catwalk challenge across a bridge, where Shikin was deemed to be the best performer. They later had a “runaway model” photo shoot overlooking the skyline of downtown Singapore. At panel, Nametha and Anjelica landed in the bottom two, and Anjelica became the first model to be eliminated.: Featured photographer: Joel Lim; Special guests: Pia Wurtzbach
54	2	"The Girl Who Is Genetically Blessed"	12 April 2017
With 13 contestants remaining, drama ensued when jealousy creeped into the model house after a unique dance improvisation challenge. The winners of the challenge were Maureen, Dorothy, Shikin, Layla and Nametha. The challenge was followed by a smiling photo shoot for Colgate. At elimination, Jennica and Heidi were chosen as the bottom two, with Heidi becoming the second contestant to leave the competition.: Featured photographer: Joel Lim; Special guests: Lukkade Metinee, Kay Grace Lee
55	3	"The Girl Who Is A Crybaby"	19 April 2017
The cycle upped the ante on the much anticipated makeover day. In an unprecedented twist, Dorothy was allowed to pick all the contestants’ new looks, which they each had to rock in a denim photo shoot out in the open fields. At panel, there was a special appearance by internationally renowned Malaysian supermodel, Ling Tan. Maureen and Jennica landed in the bottom two, with Jennica becoming the third contestant to leave the competition.: Featured photographer: Shavonne Wong; Special guests: Ling Tan, Mervin Wee, Cheryl Wee, Jean Yip
56	4	"The Girl Who Learnt That She Was Flawsome"	26 April 2017
The contestants received an unexpected wake up call from digital superstar Andrea Chong, who teamed them up for their first social media challenge of the cycle, where Valerie was chosen as the winner. They later had to work together again within the confines of a bus for an edgy model on the move photo shoot with resident judge Yu Tsai working behind the lens. At elimination, Layla became the fourth contestant to be eliminated from the competition after landing in the bottom two with Dorothy.: Featured photographer: Yu Tsai; Special guests: Andrea Chong, Jason Godfrey, Madi Ross
57	5	"The Girl Who Made 'It' Happen"	3 May 2017
The contestants were asked to create photo stories from specially selected text phrases in a challenge that was collectively won by Clara, Cindy, Dorothy, and Maureen. Later, they each had to personify “It girls” in a paparazzi-inspired photoshoot at the National Gallery Singapore. At elimination, Clara and Alicia were chosen as the bottom two, and Alicia became the fifth contestant to leave the competition.: Featured photographer: Shavonne Wong; Special guests: Cindercella, Nigel Stanislaus, Madi Ross
58	6	"The Girl Who Has A Dirty Little Secret"	10 May 2017
The models were tasked with an eye-opening social media challenge which was won by Dorothy, and later had a photo shoot for Neutrogena in which they had to pose inside a bathtub. Tension surfaced after it was revealed that Nametha had used Wi-Fi to communicate with her family, breaching the contract of the show. At panel, Dorothy was originally eliminated after landing in the bottom two with Veronika, but was allowed to remain in the competition when Nametha was disqualified for having broken the rules.: Featured photographer: Joel Lim; Special guests: Aimee Cheng-Bradshaw, Fiona Fussi, Madi Ross
59	7	"The Girl Who Fakes It Until She Makes It"	17 May 2017
The remaining contestants were split into teams of two in a social media challenge for Zalora, which was ultimately won by Cindy. The models later took on their next photo shoot, which came in the form of a video campaign for the brand where they were paired off into teams once again. At panel, the girls were surprised with the news of a double elimination, which saw Dorothy and Valerie leave the competition.: Featured photographer: Kevin Ou; Special guests: Kim Cam Jones, Rayne Reed, Kevin Ou
60	8	"The Girl Who Needs To Grow Up"	24 May 2017
The remaining six contestants had a go-sees challenge, which was won by Minh Tu, before being photographed by Yu Tsai in a black-and-white bondage photo shoot with a male model where they had to convey power and seduction. At elimination, Clara and Veronika landed in the bottom two, and Veronika became the ninth contestant to leave the competition.: Featured photographer: Yu Tsai; Special guests: Daniel Boey, Audrey Ong, Kevin Seah, Pavan J. Singh, Cheryl Wee, Dominic Lau, Joel Willfors
61	9	"The Girl Who Raised The Stakes"	31 May 2017
The remaining five contestants took part in an extreme photoshoot where they were harnessed in gowns above a Subaru as it performed stunts. They later attended the 2017 Subaru auto show, where they were introduced to the CEO of Subaru, Glenn Tan, along with some former contestants of the show. At elimination, Minh Tu received the highest score and was chosen as the newest ambassador for Subaru. Cindy was originally eliminated after landing in the bottom two with Clara but was allowed to remain in the competition. Immediately afterward Cindy Bishop beckoned a new addition, Xiao Qing, to enter the judging room. Xiao Qing's exact role in the show, however, was not revealed.: Featured photographer: Kevin Ou; Special guests: Russ Swift, Daniel Boey, Bobby Tonelli, Glenn Tan, Natalie Pickles, Monika Sta. Maria, Tawan Kedkong
62	10	"The Girls Who Became Friends (and Foes)"	7 June 2017
This episode recapped the entire cycle, and showed previously unaired footage for the first time. It was also revealed that Xiao Qing would serve as an undercover judge for the cycle, having entered as a 'new' contestant.
63	11	"The Girl Who Threatens The Competition"	14 June 2017
The 'top six' had to catwalk on a bridge as part of their challenge at Sunway Lagoon, Malaysia, where 'Xiao Qing' was deemed to be the best performer which makes the girls get threatened by her. Later, the girls had to model as ice queens at a skating rink in Sunway Pyramid and confronted Xiao Qing regarding her suspicious presence in the competition. At elimination, Maureen had best photo of the week. Cindy was eliminated after landing in the bottom two with Xiao Qing, with Minh Tu only narrowly avoiding being in danger of elimination.: Featured photographer: Bibo Aswan; Special guest: Daniel Boey
64	12	"The Girl Who Sees The Light"	21 June 2017
The contestants took part in a vertical runway challenge for Subaru, which was won by Shikin, and later had a vintage road trip photo shoot with photographer Kevin Ou. Xiao Qing was finally revealed to be a judge at panel, where Clara and Maureen landed in the bottom two. Maureen was chosen as the third and last finalist, while Clara became the eleventh contestant to be eliminated.: Featured photographer: Kevin Ou; Special guests: Daniel Boey, Glenn Tan, Xiao Qing Zhang
65	13	"The Girl Who Finishes With A Bang"	28 June 2017
The final three contestants received a surprise visit from their loved ones, and were later photographed at an avant-garde "motherland" themed photo shoot with Yu Tsai, where they had to embody the essence of their home countries. The finalists were later taken to the National Gallery Singapore, and reunited with some of the previously eliminated models for the final runway show, where they were dressed in renaissance inspired designs created by Xiao Qing Zhang. After the final deliberation of the cycle, Maureen was crowned as the fifth winner of Asia's Next Top Model.: Featured photographer: Yu Tsai; Special guests: Pia Wurtzbach, Ruby Adler, Adele Chan, Glenn Tan, Daniel Boey

== Results ==
Order	Episodes											
Order	1	2	3 (Note: In episode 3, Nametha and Alicia had a tied score of 24.0, but were called separately.)	4	5	6 (Note: In episode 6, Dorothy was originally eliminated, but was saved. Nametha was disqualified immediately afterwards for having used Wi-Fi to contact family members, violating the rules of the competition.)	7 (Note: In episode 7, Cindy, Dorothy, and Valerie landed in the bottom three. Cindy was saved with a score of 30.5. Dorothy and Valerie's scores were both omitted due to a possible editing mistake.)	8	9 (Note: In episode 9, Cindy was originally eliminated, but was saved. Immediately afterwards, Cindy Bishop beckoned a new addition to the top five, Xiao Qing, whose real identity and goal remained unknown until the next episode.)	11 (Note: In episode 11, Xiao Qing received a full set of scores to keep up the ruse. Xiao Qing landed in the bottom two with Cindy, though it was actually Tú who had the second lowest score as an actual contestant.)	12 (Note: In episode 12, Cindy Bishop revealed Xiao Qing's true identity during panel to the remaining contestants. Xiao Qing now joined the other judges to judge the top four, who learned that they were actually all part of it.)	13
1	Clara	Dorothy	Cindy	Tu	Maureen	Cindy	Shikin	Maureen	Tu	Maureen	Shikin	Maureen
2	Valerie	Cindy	Tu	Nametha	Shikin	Nametha	Tu	Tu	Shikin	Clara	Tu	Tu; Shikin
3	Maureen	Veronika	Shikin	Maureen	Valerie	Maureen	Clara	Shikin	Maureen	Shikin	Maureen	Tu; Shikin
4	Veronika	Layla	Clara	Valerie	Dorothy	Shikin	Veronika	Cindy	Clara	Tu	Clara	
5	Shikin	Maureen	Nametha	Veronika	Tu	Valerie	Maureen	Clara	Cindy	Xiao Qing		
6	Heidi	Clara	Alicia	Cindy	Nametha	Clara	Cindy	Veronika		Cindy		
7	Dorothy	Nametha	Layla	Shikin	Cindy	Tu	Dorothy; Valerie					
8	Tu	Shikin	Dorothy	Clara	Veronika	Veronika	Dorothy; Valerie					
9	Jennica	Tu	Veronika	Alicia	Clara	Dorothy						
10	Cindy	Valerie	Valerie	Dorothy	Alicia							
11	Alicia	Alicia	Maureen	Layla								
12	Layla	Jennica	Jennica									
13	Nametha	Heidi										
14	Anjelica											

The contestant was eliminated
The contestant was originally eliminated from the competition but was saved
The contestant was disqualified from the competition
Indicates the contestant was an undercover judge posing as a contestant
The contestant won the competition

=== Scores ===
(Total and average scores on the table only reflect scores calculated from the full sets added during panel)

Place	Model	Episodes												Total Score	Average
Place	Model	1	2	3	4	5	6	7	8	9	11	12	13	Total Score	Average
1	Maureen	38.7	35.3	20.5	42.5	45.3	43.4	32.3	45.0	25.0	47.3	32.7	WIN	408.0	37.09
2-3	Minh Tú	35.0	32.2	27.5	45.0	38.9	36.5	40.6	42.2	31.0	40.1	39.0	OUT	408.0	37.09
2-3	Shikin	35.9	32.3	25.0	38.7	41.8	43.0	40.8	41.8	30.0	43.0	44.8	OUT	417.1	37.92
4	Clara	44.7	34.5	24.5	34.5	32.4	37.8	40.1	33.9	22.0	44.5	32.4		381.3	34.66
—N/a	Xiao Qing										37.3			37.3	37.3
5	Cindy	34.6	43.5	29.0	39.2	34.3	44.1	30.5	37.5	18.0	36.6			347.3	34.73
6	Veronika	36.0	40.3	22.0	39.3	34.0	35.5	38.7	32.8					278.6	34.82
7-8	Dorothy	35.3	44.0	23.0	30.0	40.3	34.8	OUT						207.4	34.57
7-8	Valerie	41.5	31.4	21.0	42.0	41.3	42.5	OUT						219.7	36.62
9	Nametha	30.6	33.0	24.0	43.2	35.3	43.7							209.8	34.97
10	Alicia	34.3	31.2	24.0	34.2	32.0								155.7	31.14
11	Layla	33.2	36.0	23.5	29.0									121.7	30.43
12	Jennica	34.9	28.5	19.5										82.9	27.63
13	Heidi	35.6	24.5											60.1	30.05
14	Anjelica	29.8												29.8	29.8

Indicates the contestant had the highest score that week
Indicates the contestant was in the bottom that week
Indicates the contestant was originally eliminated that week, but was saved
Indicates the contestant was eliminated that week
Indicates the contestant was disqualified that week
Indicates the contestant was an undercover judge posing as a contestant
Indicates the contestant won the competition

== Makeovers ==
- Alicia: Cut short and dyed dark brown
- Cindy: Long straight black extensions with graphic bangs; later, extensions removed
- Clara: Shoulder length shaggy bob
- Dorothy: Trimmed with bangs and dyed auburn brown
- Jennica: Chin-length bob and dyed blue-black
- Layla: Ombré with blue extensions
- Maureen: Layered with heavy bangs
- Minh Tu: Dyed dark auburn red; later, re-dyed light brown
- Nametha: Layered and dyed ash blonde
- Shikin: Cut short and dyed blonde
- Valerie: Chin-length bob
- Veronika: Shoulder length cut with bangs and dyed burgundy
