= Monika Sta. Maria =

Filipino fashion model

- Born: Marlena Monika Ng Santa Maria; Manila, Philippines
- Education: De La Salle University
- Occupation: Fashion model
- Years active: 2015–present
- Modeling information
- Height: 1.77 m (5 ft 9 1/2 in)
- Hair color: Black
- Eye color: Black
- Agency: One Management (New York); Mercator Models Philippines; Evenstar Management Malaysia; Diva Models Singapore; Esee Models China

Marlena Monika Ng Santa Maria is a Filipino fashion model. She is known for being a contestant in the third season of Asia's Next Top Model, where she lost the competition to Indonesian model Ayu Gani and became the runner-up of the competition.

== Early life and education ==
Santa Maria was born to a Filipino father and a Malaysian mother. She was raised in the Philippines from the age of two. As a child, she never aspired to be a model because she was always shy at school and never imagined herself as a model. Santa Maria graduated with a psychology degree in De La Salle University. She also became a volleyball player in La Salle where she was part of the team Lady Spikers.

== Asia's Next Top Model ==
Before she appeared in the third season of Asia's Next Top Model, Santa Maria was already featured in various magazines such as Metro, Mega, and Circuit, and won Century Superbod in 2012. She first auditioned in the second season but was rejected. She finally got in when she auditioned again for the third season of the competition thus, becoming one of the 14 contestants. Sta. Maria is the third runner-up in a row representing the Philippines after Stephanie Retuya and Jodilly Pendre.

== 2015-present: Post Asia's Next Top Model ==
After the show, she appeared in various television shows in GMA Network such as Unang Hirit, Taste Buddies, The Ryzza Mae Show, and Fox Sports Philippines The Goat in the Philippines and Glam TV in Malaysia. She traveled around Asia to promote Subaru as being the Ambassadress. Also, featured as the cover girl of Circuit, Women's Health Malaysia, and Manila Bulletin's Style WEEKEND, and spreads for different Magazines in the Philippines. She's currently the face of Close Up and endorser for Oppo.

In 2016, she competed with Aimee Cheng-Bradshaw on StarWorld's Style and The City. Also, appeared on Asia's Next Top Model 4 for Subaru photoshoot. However, she posed and walked for TRESemme Runway Ready 2016.

In 2017, she signed to Mercator Manila managed by Jonas Gaffud. In May, she appeared in the fifth season of Asia's Next Top Model. She was also featured in a campaign for L'Oreal Paris Philippines and NIVEA Malaysia TVC's. She walked at New York Fashion Week for Manila.

In 2018, she was selected as one of the mentors in the sixth season of Asia's Next Top Model alongside her fellow alumnae Shikin Gomez and Minh Tu Nguyen, both from Cycle 5.

Awards and achievements
Preceded by (Philippines) Jodilly Pendre	Asia's Next Top Model; Runner-up; 2015 (season 3)	Succeeded by (South Korea) Sang In Kim
