= Maureen Wroblewitz =

Filipino actress and model

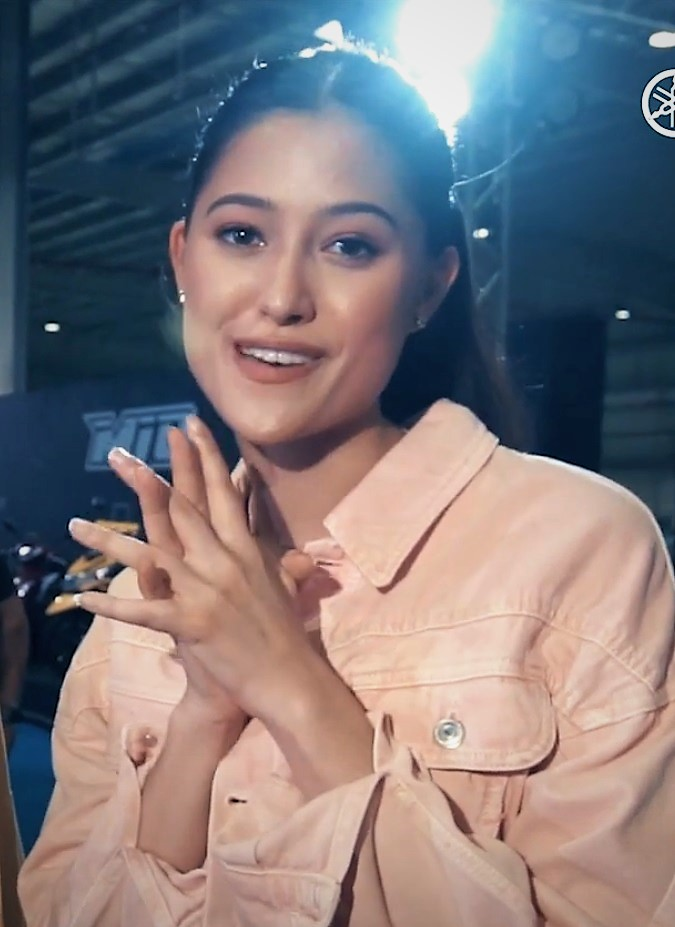
- Wroblewitz in 2019
- Born: Maureen Christa Pojas Wroblewitz; June 22, 1998 (age 28); Riyadh, Saudi Arabia
- Other name: Maureen Wrob
- Occupations: Model; Actress
- Years active: 2017–present
- Known for: Winner of Asia's Next Top Model (season 5); Miss Universe Philippines 2021 (1st Runner-Up)

Maureen Christa Pojas Wroblewitz (English: /wroʊblɛwɪts/; Tagalog: [maʊ̯ˌɾin ˌɾɔː.bolˈwits]; German: [vɹɔˈblɛvɪts]; born June 22, 1998), also known as Maureen Wrob, is a Filipino actress, beauty pageant titleholder, and model. She is best known for winning the Asia's Next Top Model season 5. She represented the Philippines in the competition and became the first Filipina to win.

== Early life ==
Maureen Christa Pojas Wroblewitz was born on June 22, 1998, in Riyadh, Saudi Arabia. She is the third of four daughters of a Filipino mother, Mariefe Pojas Wroblewitz, and a German father, Matt Wroblewitz. She lived in Riyadh for 12 years before relocating to Germany after her mother died. When she was 15 years old, she was scouted by a modeling agent on Instagram, and moved to the Philippines to pursue a modeling career. Before her participation on Asia's Next Top Model in 2017, she was a part-time model and student.

== Career ==
=== Asia's Next Top Model ===
After auditioning for Asia's Next Top Model, Wroblewitz was chosen as one of the 14 finalists on the show's fifth season. During the show, Wroblewitz received the highest score of the week three times and was in the bottom two twice. She was one of the top three contestants for the final show, alongside contestants Minh Tu Nguyen from Vietnam and Shikin Gomez from Malaysia. Wroblewitz was crowned the winner of the competition during the final episode. She was the first representative from the Philippines to win the contest. As the winner of the competition, she received a Subaru Impreza, a cover and fashion spread in the July issue of Nylon Singapore, and a chance to obtain a modeling contract with Storm Model Management in London.

=== 2017–present ===
Wroblewitz has appeared on the Filipino shows Tonight with Boy Abunda, News5, Rated K, and CNN Philippines. She is the face and ambassador of Asus and Palmolive. She is also an ambassador for the ICanServe Foundation, which helps cancer survivors. In September 2018, Wroblewitz appeared on season 6 of Asia's Next Top Model as Subaru Ambassador. A week later, she became a co-host of the Filipino variety show Eat Bulaga!. In 2019, Yamaha Motor Philippines announced that Wroblewitz was become as ambassador for Yamaha Mio i125.

In 2021, she signed a contract with Star Magic as Maureen Wrob.

Representing Pangasinan, Wroblewitz was announced as one of the top 28 competitors for Miss Universe Philippines 2021 on September 30, 2021, in Bohol. She was first runner-up, with Beatrice Luigi Gomez winning.

In June 2023, she was announced as ambassador for Levi's 501 Jeans – 150th Anniversary Campaign.

== Filmography ==
=== Film ===
| Year | Title | Role | Ref. |
|---|---|---|---|
| 2021 | Runaway | Hannah | |

=== Television ===
| Year | Title | Notes | Ref. |
|---|---|---|---|
| 2017 | Asia's Next Top Model (season 5) | Contestant | |
| 2017 | Rated K | Guest | |
| 2017 | Tonight with Boy Abunda | Guest | |
| 2017 | The Source | Guest | |
| 2017 | Headstart with Karen Davila | Guest | |
| 2017 | Mars | Guest | |
| 2018 | Sunday PinaSaya | Guest | |
| 2018 | Asia's Next Top Model (season 6) | Guest | |
| 2018 | Eat Bulaga! | Co-host (2018–2019) | |
| 2021 | Miss Universe Philippines 2021 | Contestant | |

=== Music videos ===
| Year | Artist(s) | Title | Ref. |
|---|---|---|---|
| 2018 | Juan Karlos Labajo | Buwan | |

== Personal life ==
On May 30, 2017, Wroblewitz was in a relationship with singer Juan Karlos Labajo until they broke up on June 10, 2022.

As of June 2024, she is dating fellow Filipino model Noah Steinbuch.

== Awards and nominations ==
| Year | Award | Category | Nominated work | Result | Ref. |
|---|---|---|---|---|---|
| 2017 | Asia's Next Top Model | —N/a | | 1st Place | |
| 2021 | Miss Universe Philippines | —N/a | | 1st Runner-up | |
| 2025 | The Monthly Film Festival | Actress of the Month (February) | And We'll Be Okay | Won | |

== See also ==
- List of Asia's Next Top Model contestants
- Asia's Next Top Model

Awards and achievements
| Preceded by (Thailand) Tawan Kedkong | Asia's Next Top Model; 2017 (season 5) | Succeeded by (Thailand) Dana Slosar |
| Preceded by Bella Ysmael | 1st Runner-up Miss Universe Philippines; 2021 | Succeeded by Annabelle Mae McDonnell |
