= Tawan Kedkong =

Thai model (born 1995)

- Born: Jiratchaya Kedkong; 15 August 1995 (age 31); Lopburi, Thailand
- Occupation: Fashion model
- Years active: 2016–present
- Known for: Asia's Next Top Model winner
- Modeling information
- Height: 1.77 m (5 ft 9 1/2 in)
- Hair color: Black
- Eye color: Brown
- Agency: NU Models, Singapore; Kiss Models, Bangkok; Storm Model Management, London

Jiratchaya Kedkong (Thai: จิรัชญา เกตุคง; born 15 August 1995) is a Thai fashion model and winner of the fourth season of Asia's Next Top Model.

== Asia's Next Top Model ==
Tawan was one of two contestants who represented Thailand, the other being Maya Goldman. She was declared the best performer of the week in the fourth week of the competition; as a result, she was automatically put through to week six. Also, Subaru XV cars appointed her as their 2016 brand ambassador. In the 13th episode, Tawan was crowned as the winner of the fourth season of Asia's Next Top Model.

After winning the competition she appeared in Cosmopolitan UK, Harper's Bazaar India, Vogue Thailand and Arabia. She graced the cover of Elle Croatia in August 2017.

Awards and achievements
Preceded by (Indonesia) Ayu Gani	Asia's Next Top Model; 2016 (season 4)	Succeeded by (Philippines) Maureen Wroblewitz
