= Georgina Wilson =

Filipino actress

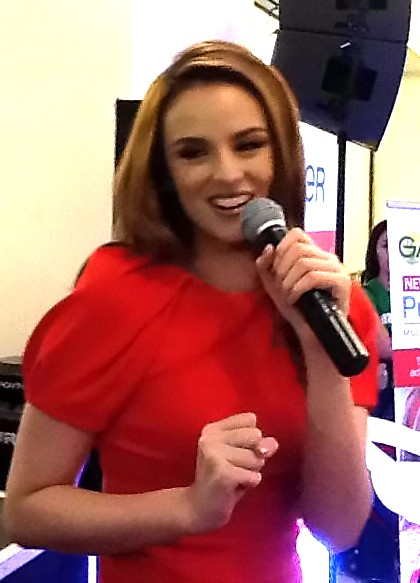
- Wilson endorsing Garnier at the TriNoma mall in Quezon City, October 2012
- Born: Georgina Ashley Diaz Wilson; 12 February 1986 (age 40); Texas, U.S.
- Citizenship: Philippines; United Kingdom
- Education: Ateneo de Manila University; University of Sydney
- Occupations: Actress; host; model; endorser; VJ
- Spouse: Arthur Burnand (m. 2016)
- Children: 3
- Relatives: Gloria Diaz (aunt); Isabelle Daza (cousin); Rio Diaz (aunt)

Georgina Ashley Diaz Wilson-Burnand (born 12 February 1986) is a Filipino actress, model and host. In 2015, Wilson hosted the third season of the reality show Asia's Next Top Model.

== Early life ==
Georgina Ashley Diaz Wilson was born on 12 February 1986 in Texas, United States. Her mother is Aurora Diaz, a Filipina, while her father is Robert Wilson, a Briton. Through her mother, she is the niece of former Miss Universe Gloria Diaz, and the cousin of her daughter, actress, model and host Isabelle Daza. The eldest among three siblings, Wilson has a younger sister named Jessica, who is also a model, and a younger brother named Samuel. She moved to Bishop Thornton, Yorkshire, England, when she was six months old and moved back to the Philippines with her family at age 10.

Wilson attended high school at the Assumption College in Makati and college at Ateneo de Manila University, where she studied for a Bachelor of Science in economics. She later transferred to the University of Sydney in Australia, where she graduated with a Bachelor of Commerce in accounting and became a double major in finance.

== Career ==
Wilson was offered numerous modeling projects since high school. She declined those offers due to the rules of her Catholic high school (Assumption) banning their students from working in modeling, TV and movies. When she graduated, she was cast in a Pond's commercial that aired in mid-2004. After which, she received more modeling and acting offers. Wilson has endorsed several products and brands in the Philippines since then, such as Bench, Garnier, TechnoMarine, Ginebra San Miguel, Argentina Corned Beef, Fila, Belo Sexy Solutions, Cream Silk, American Apparel, Cadbury, Globe Tattoo, BlackBerry, Wade, SM Accessories, Kashieca, Magnum and Jaguar. Wilson appears in Bench fashion shows every year and has been on several magazine covers.

In 2010, right before the show ended, Wilson was offered hosting duties for the then ABS-CBN noontime show Wowowee.

Wilson is also a VJ for Channel V and is the host of Asia's Next Top Model since its third cycle in 2015.

Currently, she is also the marketing director of Sunnies Studios, an eyewear brand she co-owns with Bea Soriano, Eric Dee Jr. and Martine Cajucom.

== Personal life ==
Around January 2006, Wilson had actor Richard Gutierrez as a boyfriend. When asked if Gutierrez was denying her entrance in show business, she insisted otherwise.

In the 2010 Philippine election, she endorsed the campaign and senatorial candidacy of Nacionalista Party slate member and former newscaster Gilbert Remulla, who was then serving as congressman and was his cousin in law through Remulla's wife Georgia Isabel Roa. Around this time, Wilson had already long broken up with Gutierrez, remained friends with Gutierrez's family, and was seriously considering a showbiz career, with friends in the show business such as Anne Curtis recommending such.

By September 2015, Wilson began dating British businessman and hotelier Arthur Burnand. According to Wilson, she and Burnand became engaged in October 2015. The couple married on 30 April 2016 in Winchester, England. In August 2016, Wilson confirmed that she and her husband were expecting their first child. Their first son, Archibald Francis Geoffrey "Archie" Burnand, was born on 14 December 2016. Their second son, Alfred Thor Crichton "Alfie" Burnand, was born on 24 June 2019. Recently, they welcomed a third child, a daughter named Charlotte Arabella who was born on 5 April 2021.

Wilson is Catholic.

== Television credits ==
Year	Title	Role
2010–12	Channel V Philippines	Host and VJ
2011	Showtime	Celebrity Judge
2011–12	The Source	Host
2012	Binibining Pilipinas 2012	Presenter
2014	It's Showtime	Celebrity Judge
2015	Asia's Next Top Model (season 3)	Host/Head Judge
2016	Miss Indonesia 2016	Presenter
2016	Asia's Next Top Model (season 4)	Guest Judge
