= Jason de la Peña =

English cricketer and journalist (born 1972)

Personal information
- Full name: Jason Michael de la Peña
- Born: 16 September 1972 (age 54); Hammersmith, London
- Batting: Right-handed
- Bowling: Right arm fast-medium

Domestic team information
- Years: Team
- 1991–1993: Gloucestershire
- 1994–1997: Surrey
- 1997: Hertfordshire
- 1998: Kent
- 1999: Worcestershire

Career statistics
Competition	First-class	LA
Matches	11	3
Runs scored	10	2
Batting average	2.00	–
100s/50s	0/0	0/0
Top score	7*	2*
Balls bowled	1,253	108
Wickets	29	2
Bowling average	30.89	53.50
5 wickets in innings	1	0
10 wickets in match	1	0
Best bowling	6/18	2/46
Catches/stumpings	1/–	0/–
- Source: Cricinfo, 30 October 2010

Jason Michael de la Peña (born 16 September 1972) is an English journalist and former professional cricketer who played 11 first-class and three List A matches in the 1990s. Despite his small number of appearances, he managed to appear for no fewer than four different counties. He was born in Hammersmith, London.

== Cricket career ==
De la Peña played for Gloucestershire Second XI during the second half of the 1990 season, and made his first-team debut the following season in a County Championship match against Essex. He took 1/69 from 24 overs in Essex's only innings, taking the wicket of Paul Prichard. He played one other game that season, against Leicestershire, but then returned to the seconds, where he remained until the 1993 season. He played twice for the First XI in 1993, taking 4/77 against the Australians in June, but mostly he remained in the second team, and left Gloucestershire at the end of the season.

For 1994 de la Peña joined Surrey, but another frustrating season followed: he played no first-class cricket at all, and though he did make his one-day debut, opening the bowling against Leicestershire in the AXA Equity and Law League. He conceded 34 runs in three overs and was not selected again that summer. In 1995 he performed slightly better. After taking 8/56 in a Second XI match against Leicestershire, de la Peña enjoyed a run in the first team for the only time in his career: in late July and early August he made two appearances in each form of the game. He could not manage to break through to become a regular in the team over a longer time frame and two barren years followed: 1996 was spent entirely in Surrey's second team and during the following season he played no county cricket at any level.

In 1997, de la Peña made three Minor Counties Championship appearances for Hertfordshire before Kent took him on in 1998. he was again frustrated in his ambitions playing only twice, and his three wickets cost more than 51 runs apiece.

For 1999 de la Peña moved yet again, to his fourth county, Worcestershire. He was selected for the first match of the season, a three-day game against Oxford University, and took six wickets in Oxford's first innings, with a return of 6/18 from 14 overs, and four in the second to record the only ten wicket return of his career. However he was to make only one more first-class appearance, a month later, conceding 82 runs from 13 overs against Hampshire for a single wicket.

== Media career ==
After the end of his cricketing career, de la Peña became a news presenter on Sky News, following previous stints at France 24 and RT. In December 2009 he made his debut as a cricket presenter on Sky Sports's international cricket coverage and was presenting when Sachin Tendulkar hit a record breaking 200 not out in a one-day international between India and South Africa.

He appeared in episode 5 of Asia's Next Top Model Cycle 2 as a special guest and now works as a journalist and presenter for Fox Sports Asia.

== Coaching career ==
A cricket academy catering to many international schools in Singapore was founded by Jason under the name '3cricketcoaching'. Apart from having a variety of coaches from India, South Africa, England and Australia, the academy plays an important role in the popularisation of cricket in South East Asia and offers cricket coaching and competitions for all age groups.
