= Yu Tsai =

Taiwanese-born American photographer

- Born: Taiwan
- Education: ArtCenter College of Design
- Occupation: Fashion photographer

Yu Tsai (Chinese: 蔡宇; pinyin: Cài Yǔ) is an American photographer based in Los Angeles and New York. He also works in television, appearing as a creative consultant and judge in America's Next Top Model, Germany's Next Topmodel and Asia's Next Top Model.

== Early life and education ==
Yu Tsai was born in Taiwan to a Chinese father and a Taiwanese native, and spent his childhood in Taipei. He moved to a farm in Indiana with his family when he was 12. The family then moved to Chino, California, where Yu Tsai spent his adolescence. He attended Don Antonio Lugo High School, where he was a member of the Future Farmers of America and the track team. After high school, Yu Tsai attended the University of California, Riverside and California State Polytechnic University, Pomona, where he majored in biology and zoology with an intention of becoming a veterinarian, though he did not follow through with this goal. He then attended the ArtCenter College of Design in Pasadena, California, studying painting and graphic design. It was during this time in his education that he discovered his passion for the arts, along with directing and photography as a means of telling a visual story.

== Career ==
Yu Tsai's photography has been featured in magazines such as Esquire, Cosmopolitan, Vanity Fair, Playboy, GQ, and Vogue. He has photographed celebrities including Janet Jackson, Anne Hathaway, Alicia Keys, Keira Knightley, Demi Lovato, Leonardo DiCaprio, Zhang Ziyi, Ewan McGregor, Chris Hemsworth, Lindsay Lohan, Jessica Chastain, Sienna Miller, James Marsden, Ryan Reynolds, Nick Jonas, Adam Levine, Ryan Gosling, and Zooey Deschanel. He has also worked with models including Alessandra Ambrosio, Kate Upton, Rosie Huntington, Liliana Dominguez, Ella Halikas, Yamila Diaz, Gigi Hadid, and Camille Kostek among others.

Yu Tsai has collaborated with other commercial directors in treatment writing and script development, and has directed commercials for Aetna, Gateway, and Samsung, among others. As a photographer, he has shot advertising campaigns for companies such as Apple, Clairol, Guess, and Lexus.

Yu Tsai replaced Johnny Wujek as photo shoot creative consultant on cycle 21 and cycle 22 of America's Next Top Model. During cycle 21, Yu Tsai was criticized by fans for inappropriate comments and name-calling towards Winnie Harlow, a contestant with vitiligo.

He is the judge on cycle 4 thru cycle 6 of Asia's Next Top Model as the new creative director. He also worked on I Supermodel. In 2021, he joined the judging panel of the sixth season of Supermodel Me, for which he was also the creative consultant. During his run on the show, his unprofessional and inappropriate behavior towards the contestants, including physically grabbing them without permission, was heavily criticized by audiences.

He also participated in national-wildlife conservation research with the National Geographic Research group.
