= Asia's Next Top Model season 2 =

Asia's Next Top Model
- Season 2
- Judges: Nadya Hutagalung; Joey Mead King; Mike Rosenthal; Adam Williams
- No. of contestants: 16
- Winner: Sheena Liam
- Runner-up: Jodilly Pendre
- No. of episodes: 13

Release
- Original network: STAR World
- Original release: January 8 – April 9, 2014

Season chronology
- ← Previous; Season 1 Next → Season 3

The second cycle of the reality television show Asia's Next Top Model in which a number of women compete for the title and a chance to begin their career in the modeling industry. The show features aspiring models from the entire Asia-Pacific region. The international destination during the cycle was Hong Kong, becoming the second occasion in which the series traveled to the country, after cycle 1.

The show featured a larger cast. The number of contestants increased from 14 to 16, two from Indonesia, Malaysia, Philippines, and Singapore, and one each from China, Hong Kong, India, Japan, South Korea, Taiwan, Thailand and Vietnam. Nepal was unrepresented. This is the last season to feature a contestant from China and India. The show was filmed in Malaysia, and it premiered on January 8, 2014 on STAR World.

The prize package for this cycle included a modeling contract with Storm Model Management, a chance to be the cover feature of both Harper's Bazaar Singapore and Harper's Bazaar Malaysia, a S$50,000 cash prize from FOX International Broadcast, a chance of becoming the new face of TRESemmé 2014 campaign, and a Subaru XV.

The winner of the competition was 22-year-old Sheena Liam, from Malaysia.

== Auditions ==
Casting calls were held in five countries, listed below:

- August 11 at JW Marriott, Kuala Lumpur
- August 13 at JW Marriott, Jakarta
- August 15 at Siam Discovery, Bangkok
- August 17 at FOX International Studios, Singapore City

== Cast ==
=== Contestants ===
(Ages stated are at start of contest)

Country	Contestant	Age	Height	Finish	Place
China	Jessie Yang	22	1.70 m (5 ft 7 in)	Episode 1	16
Hong Kong	Elektra Yu	21	1.75 m (5 ft 9 in)	Episode 1	15
Indonesia	Bona Kometa	27	1.79 m (5 ft 10 1/2 in)	Episode 2	14
South Korea	Ji-hye Moon	20	1.81 m (5 ft 11 1/2 in)	Episode 3	13
Vietnam	Thao Phan	26	1.73 m (5 ft 8 in)	Episode 4	12
Singapore	Poojaa Gill	22	1.70 m (5 ft 7 in)	Episode 5	11
India	Sneha Ghosh	23	1.75 m (5 ft 9 in)	Episode 7	10-9
Indonesia	Janice Hermijanto	21	1.74 m (5 ft 8 1/2 in)	Episode 7	10-9
Thailand	Tia Taveepanichpan	17	1.69 m (5 ft 6 1/2 in)	Episode 8	8
Taiwan	Natalie Pickles	25	1.70 m (5 ft 7 in)	Episode 9	7
Malaysia	Josephine Tan	23	1.75 m (5 ft 9 in)	Episode 10	6
Singapore	Nicole Lee	25	1.75 m (5 ft 9 in)	Episode 11	5
Japan	Marie Nakagawa	24	1.70 m (5 ft 7 in)	Episode 12	4
Philippines	Katarina Rodriguez	21	1.69 m (5 ft 6 1/2 in)	Episode 13	3
Philippines	Jodilly Pendre	20	1.78 m (5 ft 10 in)	Episode 13	2
Malaysia	Sheena Liam	22	1.74 m (5 ft 8 1/2 in)	Episode 13	1

=== Judges ===
- Nadya Hutagalung (host)
- Joey Mead King
- Mike Rosenthal
- Adam Williams

== Episodes ==
No. overall	No. in season	Title	Original release date
14	1	"The Girl Who Walks the Walk"	8 January 2014
The sixteen models arrived at Ritz-Carlton Hotel and were immediately set to a runway challenge over a narrow strip of glass submerged in a pool. The models later arrived on set, and Nadya and the judges determine the contestants' runway walk at the challenge and she decided to eliminate a contestant, Jessie before the photo shoot session starts. Later, the fifteen models shot the series' opening sequence and promotional stills. On panel, most of the girls got moderate to positive feedback and Tia received best photo. Natalie, Elektra and Nicole ended up in bottom 3 and the judges decided to eliminate Elektra.: Special guests: Gloria Mok, Kenneth Goh; Featured photographer: Mike Rosenthal
15	2	"The Girl Who Attracts a Following"	15 January 2014
The fourteen models were introduce to fashion blogger Bip Ling for a lesson on social media, and had a challenge in groups that involved touring the city and taking selfies. With the challenge winner Poojaa, winning a two-night stay at Pangkor Laut Resort. Later, The models were taken to Batu Caves for an oriental photo shoot where they had to pose wearing traditional designs.: Special guests: Bip Ling, Melinda Looi; Featured photographer: Maurice Mauricio
16	3	"The Girl Who's Hot When She's Cold"	22 January 2014
The thirteen models took an advertising challenge on top of the Kuala Lumpur Tower as part of the Visit Malaysia 2014 campaign. Later, the models were taken to an ice skating gymnasium, for a chilly lingerie photo shoot.: Special guest: Waka Yogi; Featured photographer: Jesper McIlroy
17	4	"The Girl That Embraces Change"	29 January 2014
The twelve models did not participate in a challenge but they received their makeovers and visits from their loved ones. Later, the models had a mod-themed photo shoot at a hair salon wearing Silas Liew's neon collection. The models then met the judges for their first ever outdoor judging panel at the MBPJ Stadium.: Special guest: Lourd Ramos; Featured photographer: Nicoline Patricia Malina
18	5	"The Girl That Runs Her Own Race"	5 February 2014
The eleven models had a military fitness challenge in groups. With the challenge winner Tia, winning a pampering spa treatment at the Ritz-Carlton Hotel. Later, the models arrived at Studio Image Room and participated in a futuristic sports-themed photo shoot. In panel, Natalie and Jodilly was appreciated for both their performances on set and photos. Natalie received best photo. While, Sneha, Tia, Poojaa and Josephine end up in bottom 4 and Poojaa became the 6th girl to leave the competition.: Special guests: Amber Chia, Daniel Remon, Jason de la Peña; Featured photographer: Loh Lin Shan
19	6	"The Girl Who Works The Room"	12 February 2014
The ten models had a cocktail party as part of their challenge where they have to be sociable and glamorous to the guests. With the challenge winner Jodilly, winning extra 15 frames for the next photo shoot session. Later, the models were posing at the Subaru XV Assembly Line Factory wearing couture dresses. On panel, the judges faced a dilemma in awarding best photo. Finally, Jodilly was awarded best photo, Josephine earning a second call-out. Janice and Tia ended in bottom 2 but none was eliminated as it was a pre-determined non-elimination episode.: Special guests: Glenn Tan, Haritha Shan; Featured photographer: Timon Wehrli
20	7	"The Girl Who Is In the Spotlight"	19 February 2014
The ten models had a challenge, where they needed to create the day and night look in two different occasions. Later, the models pose for TRESemmé while overlooking the Kuala Lumpur Tower. Sheena, Marie, Katarina and Nicole received positive feedback from the judges. While, Sneha, Tia, Josephine and Janice failed to impress the judges. Marie received best photo for the second time while Sneha, Tia and Janice ends up in bottom 3. This week the models saw both Janice and Sneha leave the competition.: Special guest: Coco Lee; Featured photographer: Ukay Cheung
21	8	"The Girl Who Makes a Splash"	26 February 2014
The eight models went to Penang, where they did their next challenge to make a campaign for World Wide Fund for Nature, with jewelry and millipedes. With the challenge winner Tia, winning a lunch treatment with Jimmy Choo. Later, the models went to Pangkor Island for an editorial swimwear photo shoot. At panel, Marie was applauded for her third best photo, Josephine and Nicole also excelled, securing the top three position. Katarina was praised as she finally improved. Natalie, Jodilly, and Tia found themselves in bottom three. Natalie for looking lost in the photo, Jodilly who had a good pose but not a good expression, and Tia for not listening at the photographer and mentor.Tia was sent home, after her fifth bottom appearance, sparing Jodilly.
22	9	"The Girl With a Wild Side"	5 March 2014
The seven models went to the jungle of Sarawak, Borneo and had a camping challenge and had a one-night camping stay overnight. Later, the models pose as jungle warriors at the Borneo Jungle while wearing native designs.: Special guest: Rob Scheppy; Featured photographer: Mike Rosenthal
23	10	"The Girl Who's Lost"	26 March 2014 (Note: Episodes 10 and 11 were originally scheduled to air on March 12, 2014 and March 19, 2014 respectively. They were postponed for two weeks due to unforeseen circumstances in commemorating with Malaysia Airlines Flight 370. Episode 11 had been rescheduled to air on April 2, but the producers of the show later decided to omit the episode altogether to respect the people affected by the tragedy. The pre-finale top four episode was aired in its place. The episode was finally broadcast one month after the cycle finale, on May 8, 2014 during a cycle re-run in Indonesia.)
The six models did not participate in a challenge, but they continued to travel around the Malaysian Borneo peninsula. Later, the models were sent to Gaya Island, near Kota Kinabalu wearing Alex Perry's designs. On panel, Katarina and Jodilly received positive feedback.: Special guests: Alex Perry, Jade Parfitt, Jen Atkins, Marina; Featured photographer: Jack Guy
24	11	"The Girl on Life's Journey"	8 May 2014
The five remaining models get to meet Season 1's winner Jessica Amornkuldilok for a runway workshop, before they traveled overseas to Hong Kong and greeted to Season 1 alumni Helena Chan. Later, The models participate in a photo shoot for Malaysia Airlines.: Special guests: Jessica Amornkuldilok, Helena Chan, Mariana Renata, Rajo Laurel; Featured photographer: Nurulita A. Rahayu; Note: The episode was originally canceled due to the issue of the lost Malaysia Airlines Flight 370 which crashed in the South Indian Ocean (and subsequently Flight 17 which also crashed in Ukraine). The show released a recap of what had happened during the episode in their official YouTube channel. The episode was eventually broadcast about one month after the cycle finale, on a cycle re-run in Indonesia.
25	12	"The Girl Who's Epic"	2 April 2014
The four remaining models were sent to Malacca for a go-see challenge. With the challenge winner, winning a $5,000 shopping spree at Malacca. Later, the models took part in a fashion editorial for Harper's Bazaar Singapore.: Special guests: Ashley Roberts, Kenneth Goh, Icona Pop, Natasha Kraal, Romero Jennings, T-ara; Featured photographer: Aaron Lee
26	13	"The Girl Who Wins It All"	9 April 2014
The three remaining models flew to Kuala Terengganu and participated in a kampong life photo shoot. They also walked in a fashion show together with previously eliminated contestants. The final panel was divided into two phases, used for their method in the final deliberation. First phase, they will be judged for their last photo shoot. The second phase, they will be judged based on their final walk. After the judges reviewed the progression of the two finalists, Sheena Liam was crowned the second winner of Asia's Next Top Model.: Special guests: Justice Crew, Kenneth Goh, Ling Tan, Marina Fairfax, Natasha Kraal; Featured photographer: Mike Rosenthal

== Results ==
Order	Episodes												
Order	1 (Note: In episode 1, Jessie was eliminated outside of judging panel as a result of having performed the worst during the runway challenge. Additionally, in episodes 1 through 9, with the exception of episodes 5 and 6, the bottom three contestants were in danger of elimination.)	2	3	4	5	6 (Note: In episode 6, Janice and Tia landed in the bottom two and neither of them were eliminated.)	7 (Note: In episode 7, Janice, Sneha and Tia landed in the bottom three. Tia was deemed safe, leaving Janice and Sneha in danger of elimination. Nadya handedly revealed a blank photo, eliminating both contestants from the competition.)	8	9	10	11	12	13
1	Tia	Nicole	Josephine	Marie	Natalie	Jodilly	Marie	Marie	Katarina	Jodilly	Sheena	Katarina	Sheena
2	Sheena	Jodilly	Nicole	Josephine	Jodilly	Josephine	Nicole	Josephine	Jodilly	Katarina	Jodilly	Jodilly	Jodilly
3	Josephine	Sheena	Sheena	Poojaa	Sheena	Nicole	Sheena	Nicole	Sheena	Sheena	Marie	Sheena	Katarina
4	Jodilly	Thao	Katarina	Nicole	Nicole	Sneha	Katarina	Sheena	Marie	Marie	Katarina	Marie	
5	Thao	Katarina	Natalie	Natalie	Marie	Sheena	Jodilly	Katarina	Josephine	Nicole	Nicole		
6	Marie	Natalie	Tia	Tia	Janice	Katarina	Natalie	Natalie	Nicole	Josephine			
7	Sneha	Sneha	Thao	Sheena	Katarina	Marie	Josephine	Jodilly	Natalie				
8	Janice	Janice	Poojaa	Katarina	Josephine	Natalie	Tia	Tia					
9	Bona	Josephine	Jodilly	Jodilly	Sneha	Janice; Tia	Janice; Sneha						
10	Katarina	Poojaa	Marie	Sneha	Tia	Janice; Tia	Janice; Sneha						
11	Poojaa	Ji-hye	Sneha	Janice	Poojaa								
12	Ji-hye	Marie	Janice	Thao									
13	Nicole	Tia	Ji-hye										
14	Natalie	Bona											
15	Elektra												
16	Jessie												

The contestant was eliminated outside of judging panel
The contestant was eliminated
The contestant was part of a non-elimination bottom two
The contestant won the competition

== Makeovers ==
- Janice: Wavy curls and dyed chestnut brown
- Jodilly: Trimmed with Mayte Garcia inspired V-shaped bangs
- Josephine: Victoria Beckham inspired bob cut
- Katarina: Dyed dark brown
- Marie: Whitney Houston inspired maroon afro
- Natalie: Wavy chin length bob
- Nicole: Rocker chick pixie cut
- Poojaa: Chin length bob
- Sheena: Dyed platinum blonde with light pink highlights
- Sneha: Cut short
- Thao: Darkened and straightened
- Tia: Dyed dark brown
