= Ling Tan =

Malaysian model (born 1974)

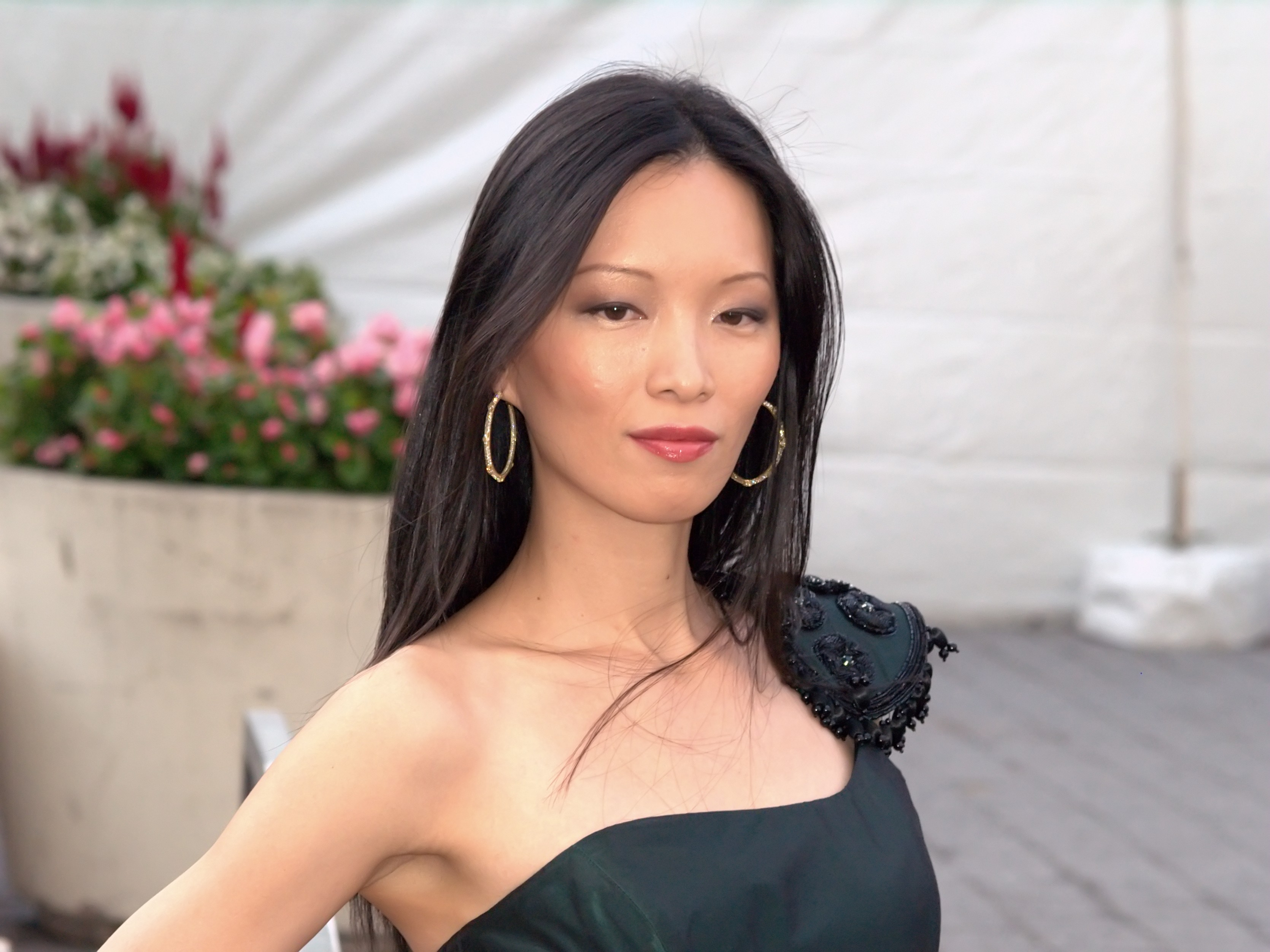
- Tan at the Metropolitan Opera, Lincoln Center, New York City, 2009
- Born: 9 October 1974 (age 52); Kuala Lumpur, Malaysia
- Occupation: Fashion model
- Modeling information
- Height: (US) 5 ft 9.5 in (1.77 m) (EU) 177cm
- Hair color: Black
- Eye color: Dark Brown
- Agency: The Model CoOp (New York); Elite Model Management (Paris, Toronto); Uno Models (Barcelona); Munich Models (Munich)

Chinese name
- Traditional Chinese: 陳曼齡
- Simplified Chinese: 陈曼龄
Transcriptions
Standard Mandarin
- Hanyu Pinyin: Chén Mànlíng
Southern Min
- Hokkien POJ: Tân Bānlîng

Tan Mang Ling (born 9 October 1974), usually credited as Ling Tan, is a Malaysian model based in New York City. She has participated in hundreds of fashion shows and has been captured by top fashion photographers such as Richard Avedon, who photographed Tan for the Pirelli Calendar in 1997.

== Early life ==
Tan was born and raised in Kuala Lumpur, Malaysia and is of Chinese ancestry. She has a younger sister who is also a model. Her father was a taxi driver and her mother a seamstress. She was educated in a Chinese school and speaks four varieties of Chinese as well as Malay and English. Tan also studied art and design before beginning her career as a model.

== Discovered and career beginnings ==
Her first big break came when she was discovered at a small fashion show while waiting for a friend in a hotel lobby, by an advertising executive. Tan then appeared in an ad campaign for Tiger Beer. European and American designers showing their collections in Malaysia encouraged her to move to New York City.

== Success and acting debut ==
Tan's first catwalk show was Zang Toi's Spring/ Summer 1995 show in November 1994. Tan has worked with many top designers, including Giambattista Valli, Elie Saab, Karl Lagerfeld, Yves Saint Laurent, Tom Ford, Emporio Armani, Donna Karan, and Chanel. She has also been photographed by leading fashion photographers including Irving Penn, Mario Testino, Peter Lindbergh, and Richard Avedon, who photographed Tan for the Pirelli calendar in 1997.

Tan has appeared on the covers and editorial pages of top fashion magazines. She was the subject of a twelve-page feature story in the prestigious Italian Vogue and a spread in Vogue US and Vogue China. She also appeared on the covers of Vogue Germany in November 1998, Vogue Korea in April 1999 and now defunct Vogue Singapore in 1996. She appeared in Prestige Magazines Malaysian edition alongside Malaysian shoe designer, Jimmy Choo.

Tan has appeared in advertising campaigns, such as Ann Taylor’s 50th Anniversary “50 Women”, Banana Republic online ad campaign in Spring 2009, Bergdorf Goodman, Bloomingdale's Holiday ad campaign in 2007, Old Navy Perfect Summer Ad in Summer 2008, and Yves Saint Laurent. Tan has worked on the small screen, appearing in television commercials for Emporio Armani fragrances, FORD Car, La Poste (France’s postal service) and Pantene Hair Color. She was also featured in George Michael’s music video for his hit song "Fast Love".

She has been the subject of a biography featured on CNN’s Style Network with Elsa Klensch, and has appeared on the HBO series, Sex and The City and the CBS series, Blue Bloods.

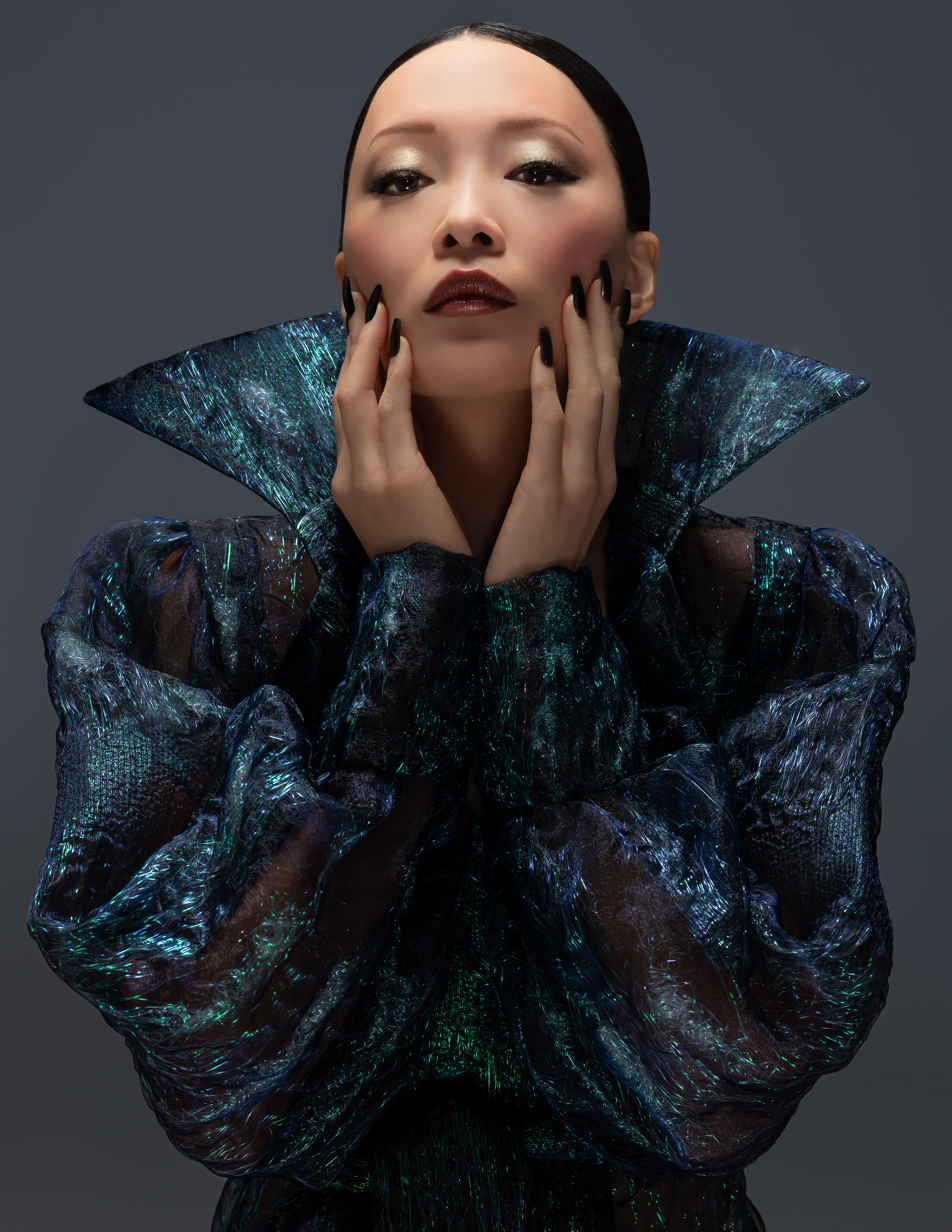
Tan in 2024

After a long hiatus from the runway, Tan walked for the Givenchy Fall/Winter 2010 show in Paris and did a video for Polo Ralph Lauren for the Fall 2010 campaign. In 2011, Tan along with Yasmin Warsame, Elsa Benítez, and Jacquetta Wheeler, was the face of L'Oreal Code Breaker Winter 2010 and Spring 2011 campaign. Ling Tan and her younger sister, Ein Tan, appeared together on the covers of Harper's Bazaar Malaysia and Harper's Bazaar Singapore. In 2014, Tan appeared as special guest in the final episode of Asia's Next Top Model Cycle 2 and 3rd episode of Asia's Next Top Model Cycle 5.

== Agencies ==
Tan has signed with The Model CoOp in New York City, and Innovative Artists Talent And Literary Agency, also in New York. She has also signed with Elite Paris, Elite Toronto, Munich Models and UNO Models in Barcelona. She used to be signed with IMG and Wilhelmina Models in New York.

== See also ==
- Chinese in New York City
