= Sheena Liam =

Malaysian model (born 1991)

- Born: Liam Yu Sheen; 7 May 1991 (age 35); Subang Jaya, Selangor, Malaysia
- Citizenship: Malaysia
- Years active: 2014–present
- Spouse(s): Ernest Zacharevic (m. 2018)
- Modeling information
- Height: 174 cm (5 ft 8 1/2 in)
- Hair color: Black
- Eye color: Brown
- Agency: Storm Models; Hollywood Models; Metropolitan Models; Muse Models

Chinese name
- Traditional Chinese: 粘悅馨
- Simplified Chinese: 粘悦馨
- Hanyu Pinyin: Nián Yuèxīn
- Pha̍k-fa-sṳ: Ngiàm Ye̍t-hîn
- Jyutping: Nim4 Jyut6 Hing1
- Hokkien POJ: Liâm Oa̍t-heng
- Tâi-lô: Liâm Ua̍t-hing

Liam Yue Sheen (Chinese: 粘悅馨; pinyin: Nián Yuèxīn; Jyutping: Nim4 Jyut6 Hing1; Pe̍h-ōe-jī: Liâm Oa̍t-heng; Pha̍k-fa-sṳ: Ngiàm Ye̍t-hîn; born 7 May 1991) also professionally known as Sheena Liam is a fashion model and embroidery artist from Malaysia, most notable for being the winner of the second season of Asia's Next Top Model. She is also an artist working under the moniker Times New Romance best known for her embroideries of feminine figures with loose braids flowing from the canvas.

== Asia's Next Top Model ==
Liam was one of the two representatives from Malaysia in the second season of Asia's Next Top Model alongside Josephine Tan. After a successful run throughout the series, Liam eventually went on to win the competition over Filipina representatives Jodilly Pendre and Katarina Rodriguez.

Liam was originally signed under a preliminary three-month contract with Storm Model Management, which was later extended due to her ability to book both print and runway work during her first trip to London. As the winner of Asia's Next Top Model, she appeared in a spread and on the cover of Harper's Bazaar Singapore and Malaysia for their May 2014 issue. She also received SGD 50,000 from FOX International Broadcast and a Subaru XV. She also became the new face of TRESemmé for their 2014 campaigns.

== Post show career ==
Liam currently travels frequently for modelling purposes. She is represented by Storm Model Management in London, Women/360 Models in Paris, Hollywood Model Management in LA and Muse Management in New York.

She made her fashion week debut in Spring/Summer 2014 London Fashion Week, walked for Fashion East, Mariana Jungmann, Ones To Watch and Simone Rocha.

Runway highlights include Diane Von Furstenberg Fall 2015 and Opening Ceremony Fall 2017.

Sheena has graced the cover of Harpers Bazaar, Cleo, DesignScene, HerWorld etc.

In 2017, Sheena has booked major jobs in New York such as Fila and a commercial for lingerie brand Adore Me. She was also featured in the Kill Jill music video for American rapper and Outkast member Big Boi.

== Art ==
Liam produces artwork under the moniker 'Times New Romance'. Her artwork consists of embroidery pieces featuring feminine figures. Sheena held her debut solo exhibition of original works in Paris, France at Idem Paris in 2018, in 2019, Sheena was listed by The Art Gorgeous as one of the Art World's top 200 Influencers. An issue focusing creative professionals making an impact in digital spaces

== Personal life ==
Sheena and renowned Lithuanian artist Ernest Zacharevic both announced their marriage on their respective Instagram accounts. Their marriage registration took place in Vilnius, Lithuania.

Awards and achievements
Preceded by (Thailand) Jessica Amornkuldilok	Asia's Next Top Model; 2014 (season 2)	Succeeded by (Indonesia) Ayu Gani
