= Katarina Rodriguez =

Filipino actress, athlete, model, and beauty queen

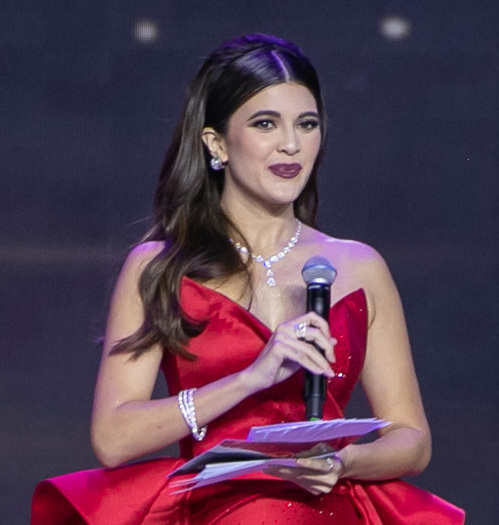
- Born: Katarina Sonja Rodriguez (Note: Katarina Rodriguez was born in the United States of America. Thus, she does not possess her mother's maiden name which is Artigas.); August 1, 1992 (age 34); Orlando, Florida, United States
- Citizenship: Philippines
- Education: De La Salle University, (Business Management and Philosophy)
- Height: 1.70 m (5 ft 7 in)
- Children: 2
- Beauty pageant titleholder
- Title: Binibining Pilipinas Intercontinental 2017; Miss World Philippines 2018
- Hair color: Black
- Eye color: Light Brown
- Major competitions: Asia's Next Top Model (season 2); (Top 3); Binibining Pilipinas 2017; (Winner – Binibining Pilipinas Intercontinental 2017); Miss Intercontinental 2017; (1st Runner-Up); Miss World Philippines 2018; (Winner); Miss World 2018; (Unplaced)

Katarina Sonja Rodriguez (Note: Katarina Rodriguez was born in the USA. Thus, she does not possess her mother's maiden name which is Artigas.) (Tagalog pronunciation: [ɾoˈdɾigɛs]; born August 1, 1992) is a Filipino actress, athlete, model and beauty pageant titleholder who was crowned Miss World Philippines 2018. She represented the Philippines at the Miss World 2018 pageant but was unplaced. Previously, she was crowned Binibining Pilipinas Intercontinental 2017 and placed 1st Runner-Up in Miss Intercontinental 2017.

She rose to fame after being the last eliminated in the second season of Asia's Next Top Model in 2014.

== Early life and education ==
Rodriguez was born in Orlando, Florida, United States, to Filipino parents. Her mother is from Manila, while her dad is from Davao. She spent her childhood going back and forth the United States and the Philippines every other year.

She attended high school in Orlando and recounted the bullying she experienced at school, which would later on help her develop "tough skin" before finally moving permanently to the Philippines with her family. In Manila, she pursued and completed a double major in business management and philosophy from the De La Salle University.

She is also a cycling instructor, a competitive long-distance runner, and participated as a member of the De La Salle University Women's Track and Field Team.

== Modeling career ==
At the encouragement of her two close friends, Katarina auditioned for the second season of Asia's Next Top Model. She was selected as part of the show's final three contestants along with fellow Filipina candidate Jodilly Pendre, finishing as a runner-up.

== Pageantry ==
After her appearance in Asia's Next Top Model, Rodriguez caught the attention of well-known beauty queen trainer, Jonas Gaffud of Aces and Queens, who encouraged her to try out pageantry.

=== Binibining Pilipinas 2017 ===
Rodriguez joined the Binibining Pilipinas 2017 pageant and won the title of Binibining Pilipinas Intercontinental 2017 during the coronation night held at the Smart Araneta Coliseum on April 30, 2017, gaining her the right to represent the Philippines at Miss Intercontinental 2017.

On March 18, 2018, Rodriguez crowned Karen Gallman as her successor at the Binibining Pilipinas 2018 pageant held at the Smart Araneta Coliseum in Quezon City, Philippines.

=== Miss Intercontinental 2017 ===
Rodriguez represented the Philippines at the Miss Intercontinental 2017 pageant held in Hurghada, Egypt on January 24, 2018 where she finished as 1st runner-up to Verónica Salas Vallejo from Mexico. She also won the Miss Media Popularity award and 1st runner-up in Best in National Costume.

=== Miss World Philippines 2018 ===
Representing Davao City, she was crowned as Miss World Philippines 2018 by the outgoing titleholder Laura Lehmann on October 7, 2018.

On September 15, 2019, Rodriguez crowned Michelle Dee as her successor at the Miss World Philippines 2019 pageant held at the Smart Araneta Coliseum in Quezon City, Philippines.

=== Miss World 2018 ===
She represented the Philippines at the Miss World 2018 in Sanya, China on December 8, 2018. She is one of favorite contestants in Miss World 2018 but failed to place in the semifinals, ending the Philippines' seven-year streak of consecutive placements, from 2011 through 2017. The event was won by Vanessa Ponce of Mexico.

== Filmography ==
=== Film ===
Year	Title	Role	Notes	Ref.
2024	G! LU		First film appearance	

=== Television ===
Year	Title	Role	Ref.
2014	Asia's Next Top Model	Herself / Contestant (2nd Runner-Up)	
2017	HaPi House	Victoria	
2020	Make It with You	Rio Isla	

== Personal life ==
Rodriguez is an advocate of peace and HIV-AIDS awareness. In 2019, she became the ambassador of Save the Children Philippines. In October 2021, she announced that she was expecting a son with her partner, businessman Niño Barbers.

== Notes ==
Awards and achievements
Preceded by Laura Lehmann (Makati)	Miss World Philippines; 2018	Succeeded by Michelle Dee (Makati)
Preceded by (Sri Lanka) Tracy Ann De Zilva	Miss Intercontinental (1st Runner-Up); 2017	Succeeded by (Costa Rica) Adriana Moya
Preceded by Jennifer Hammond	Binibining Pilipinas; Intercontinental; 2017	Succeeded by Karen Gallman
