= Helena Chan =

Hong Kong fashion model

Helena Chan Rui Ying
- Born: 6 July 1989 (age 37); Southern District, Hong Kong
- Citizenship: Hong Kong
- Occupations: Fashion Model, Television Host
- Years active: 2012–present
- Modeling information
- Height: 1.78 m (5 ft 10 in)
- Hair color: Brown
- Eye color: Light brown
- Agency: Elite Model Management
- Website: http://thehelenachan.blogspot.com/

Helena Chan Rui Ying (Chinese: 陳瑞瑩; Jyutping: Can4 Seoi6 Ying4) (born 6 July 1989) is a Hong Kong-Swedish Channel V presenter and fashion model. She is of Chinese and Swedish descent. She is best known for representing Hong Kong in the first season of Asia's Next Top Model. She is the current host of STAR World's Style Setter. Helena is a keen shark fin activist. As a top model, she has appeared in top fashion magazines, including Harper's Bazaar, Esquire, Baccarat Magazine, and MRMagazine. She is currently working on her own fashion line.

== Early life ==
Chan is a kindergarten teacher in Hong Kong, where she was raised for thirteen years, and currently works as a freelance model. She began her modeling career at the age of fifteen. She attended King George V School (Hong Kong). Before signing to Elite Model Management, she was turned down by various modeling agencies. After being encouraged by her friends, she applied for the first season of Asia's Next Top Model, representing Hong Kong, where she was evicted for her bad temper after making it to the top six. After participating on AsNTM she enjoyed a successful career as a celebrity in Hong Kong. Among her top model campaigns are an Inniu campaign and a fashion spread in Harper's Bazaar. She was inspired by supermodels like Cara Delevingne and fashion designer Roberto Cavalli.

== Filmography ==
Year	TV Show	Role	Notes
2012–2013	Asia's Next Top Model (season 1)	Herself	Contestant; finished 6th place
2014	Style Setter	Host	STAR World Asia show
2014	Asia's Next Top Model (season 2)	Herself	Guest star
2018	Olexesh Feat. Edin: Magisch	Herself	Music Video
2019	Cesar's Recruit Asia (Season 3)	Vet Nurse	Contestant; finished 3rd Place
