= Josephine Tan =

Malaysian model and beauty pageant titleholder

- Born: Josephine Tan Yee Mei; 7 April 1990 (age 36); Kuantan, Pahang, Malaysia
- Citizenship: Malaysia
- Education: Graduate Broadcasting in St. John's University of New York Achievement
- Height: 1.75 m (5 ft 9 in)
- Beauty pageant titleholder
- Title: Miss Malaysia Earth 2013; Supermodel International 2016
- Hair colour: Black
- Eye colour: Black
- Major competitions: Miss Malaysia Earth 2013 (Winner); Miss Earth 2013 (Unplaced)

Josephine Tan Yee Mei (born 7 April 1990) is a Malaysian model and a beauty pageant titleholder. In 2016, she became the first ever Malaysian to win Supermodel International.

== Personal life ==
Tan was born in Kuantan, Pahang, Malaysia but lives in Kuala Lumpur. She is of a Chinese ancestry. She graduated as a broadcasting major in St. John's University of New York. In 2016, Tan started her own modelling academy and agency known as Character International Modelling Academy and Agency in Kuala Lumpur. Tan is also the organiser for Miss KL Earth 2015 and Supermodel International Malaysia 2017. Now she is currently living in Singapore and working as a flight stewardess in Singapore Airlines.

== Pageantry ==
Tan started joining beauty pageants when she was 18 years old. She participated in Miss Malaysia Model of the World in 2009 and finished as 3rd runner-up. In 2011, she participated in the X Top Model Search Malaysia, but did not place, however she won the Best in Catwalk Award and 6 other subsidiary titles. In 2013, Tan participated in Miss Earth Malaysia 2013 and won the title, and she later represented Malaysia in Miss Earth 2013. She did not place but won The X Factor Award.

In 2016, Tan was the winner of Supermodel International Malaysia 2016. She represented Malaysia and won the Supermodel International 2016 crown, becoming the first ever woman from Malaysia to win an international crown. Tan had started her modelling career as early as 18 years old. She had done numerous fashion show and shoot across the world like New York, Indonesia, Philippines, Thailand, China, Hong Kong and many more.

She is now diversifying her career and started hosting for numerous pageants and events. Tan is also starting to venture as a choreographer and show producer for international pageants held in India and all other parts of the world. She is also a mentor for numerous pageant by giving grooming class, catwalk class and many more.

== Asia's Next Top Model ==
Tan was one of two contestants representing Malaysia on season 2 of Asia's Next Top Model, the other being eventual winner Sheena Liam. She won 1 best photo and 1 challenge. Tan became the eleventh eliminated.
