= Jessica Amornkuldilok =

Thai model (born 1985)

- Born: Rattana Yimchan; 18 December 1985 (age 40); Lopburi, Thailand
- Citizenship: Thailand
- Occupation: Model
- Years active: 2013–present
- Children: 1
- Modeling information
- Height: 1.78 m (5 ft 10 in)
- Hair color: Black
- Eye color: Brown
- Agency: Storm Model Management, London; Wilhelmina Models, Thailand

Jessica Amornkuldilok (Thai: เจสสิก้า อมรกุลดิลก, RTGS: Chetsika Amonkundilok), born Rattana Yimchan (Thai: รัตนา ยิ้มจันทร์; 18 December 1985) is a Thai fashion model, who is the winner of the first cycle of Asia's Next Top Model in 2012.

== Elite Model Look Thailand ==
In 2004, Amornkuldilok applied for Elite Model Look Thailand, where she eventually placed as the runner-up. She failed to progress onto the world final.

== Asia's Next Top Model ==
Amornkuldilok was one of the two contestants to represent Thailand on season 1 of Asia's Next Top Model, the other being Monica Benjaratjarunun. She was declared the best-performing contestant in the four weeks before the semi-final round, won four reward challenges, and never landed in the bottom two, being the only contestant to accomplish these feats. She won the competition against Kate Ma (Taiwan) and Stephanie Retuya (Philippines). She is the first of three representatives from Thailand to have won this competition.

== After Asia's Next Top Model ==
After her victory in the show, she landed on many magazine covers on Harper's Bazaar Singapore, Grazia Thailand, Numero Thailand, Posh Myanmar, The Magazine, Nylon Thailand and Harper’s Bazaar Vietnam in April and June 2019 with Vietnamese designer Phuong Mai. Amornkuldilok became the face of the Canon IXUS 2013 Campaign, and booked various high-end fashion shows around the world under the management of Storm Model Management in London.

She participated in Singapore Digital Fashion Week in 2015. She make a debut at Milan Fashion Week S/S 2016 walked for Shelly Jin.

Awards and achievements
Preceded by New	Asia's Next Top Model; 2013 (season 1)	Succeeded by (Malaysia) Sheena Liam
