= Asia's Next Top Model season 1 =

Asia's Next Top Model
- Season 1
- Judges: Nadya Hutagalung; Joey Mead King; Daniel Boey; Todd Anthony Tyler
- No. of contestants: 14
- Winner: Jessica Amornkuldilok
- Runners-up: Kate Ma; Stephanie Retuya
- No. of episodes: 13

Release
- Original network: STAR World
- Original release: November 25, 2012 – February 17, 2013

Season chronology
- Next → Season 2

The first cycle of the reality television show Asia's Next Top Model in which a number of women compete for the title and a chance to begin their career in the modeling industry. The show features aspiring models from the entire Asia-Pacific region. The international destinations for this cycle were Batam, Indonesia, and Hong Kong.

The cycle featured 14 contestants from the China, Hong Kong, India, Indonesia, Japan, Malaysia, Nepal, Philippines, Singapore, South Korea, Taiwan, Thailand, and Vietnam. This is notably the only cycle to feature a contestant from Nepal.

The show was filmed in Singapore, and it premiered globally on November 25, 2012 on STAR World.

The prize package for this cycle included a modeling contract with Storm Model Management, an all-expenses-paid trip to London, a chance to be the cover feature in Harper's Bazaar Singapore, a position as the face of Canon IXUS' 2013 campaign, a S$100,000 cash prize, and a Subaru XV.

The winner of the competition was 26-year-old Jessica Amornkuldilok, from Thailand.

== Auditions ==
Casting calls were held in four countries, listed below:

- July 16 at JW Marriott, Kuala Lumpur
- July 18 at JW Marriott, Jakarta
- July 20 at Siam Discovery, Bangkok
- July 22 at FOX International Studios, Singapore City

== Cast ==
=== Contestants ===
(Ages stated are at start of contest)

Country	Contestant	Age	Height	Finish	Place
Singapore	Kyla Tan	23	1.71 m (5 ft 7 1/2 in)	Episode 1	14
Thailand	Monica Benjaratjarunun	19	1.70 m (5 ft 7 in)	Episode 2	13 (quit)
China	Bei Si Liu	24	1.76 m (5 ft 9 1/2 in)	Episode 3	12
South Korea	Yun-ji 'Jee' Choi	27	1.72 m (5 ft 7 1/2 in)	Episode 4	11
Indonesia	Filantropi Witoko	24	1.75 m (5 ft 9 in)	Episode 4	10
Vietnam	Thùy Trang Nguyễn	23	1.80 m (5 ft 11 in)	Episode 5	9
India	Rachel Erasmus	22	1.67 m (5 ft 5 1/2 in)	Episode 6	8
Malaysia	Melissa Th'ng	21	1.68 m (5 ft 6 in)	Episode 7	7
Hong Kong	Helena Chan	22	1.77 m (5 ft 9 1/2 in)	Episode 9	6
Nepal	Aastha Pokharel	20	1.77 m (5 ft 9 1/2 in)	Episode 10	5
Japan	Sofia Wakabayashi	24	1.83 m (6 ft 0 in)	Episode 12	4
Philippines	Stephanie Retuya	23	1.76 m (5 ft 9 1/2 in)	Episode 13	3-2
Taiwan	Kate Ma	22	1.75 m (5 ft 9 in)	Episode 13	3-2
Thailand	Jessica Amornkuldilok	26	1.77 m (5 ft 9 1/2 in)	Episode 13	1

=== Judges ===
- Nadya Hutagalung (host)
- Joey Mead King
- Daniel Boey
- Todd Anthony Tyler

== Episodes ==
No. overall	No. in season	Title	Original release date
1	1	"Which Girl Can Handle the Limelight?"	25 November 2012
The fourteen models arrived at Wisma Atria and were immediately given their first challenge: walking in a fashion show in front of a live audience while wearing couture dresses. Trang won the challenge and received a $5,000 shopping spree at Wisma Atria. Later, the models were taken to Little India for a photo shoot, where they had to pose as quirky girls. After the shoot, Trang went shopping using her prize from the earlier challenge. At judging, Stephanie, Rachel, and Helena impressed the judges by fully embracing the theme of the shoot. Most of the remaining contestants received positive feedback, except for Melissa and Kyla, who struggled to meet the expectations. Helena was awarded best photo, followed by Stephanie, Rachel, Trang, and Jessica. Kyla and Melissa landed in the bottom two, with Kyla becoming the first contestant eliminated from the competition.: Special guests: Afton Chen, Lauren Clarke Jensen, Louis Koh; Featured photographer: Todd Anthony Tyler
2	2	"Which Girl Can Stand Out?"	2 December 2012
The thirteen models participated in a VIP private fashion show for designer Thomas Wee at L’Atelier de Joël Robuchon at Resorts World Sentosa. Trang won the challenge, earning a demi-couture outfit from Thomas Wee and a luxury dining experience at L’Atelier de Joël Robuchon, which she shared with two friends. Later, the models were taken to Tanjong Pagar railway station for a group photo shoot, where they posed in designs from the Fall/Winter 2012 Prada collection. After the shoot, Monica decided to withdraw from the competition due to her father's illness. At judging, Rachel collapsed and was rushed to the hospital. After the judges deliberated, the group photo featuring Bei Si, Sofia, Aastha, and Trang was selected to be featured as an editorial in Harper’s Bazaar. Aastha received best photo, while Jee and Stephanie landed in the bottom two. However, Nadya announced that no one would be eliminated, as Monica had already chosen to leave the competition.: Special guests: Adam Williams, Kenneth Goh, Thomas Wee; Featured photographer: Junita Simon
3	3	"Which Girl Can Own a New Look?"	9 December 2012
The twelve models did not compete in a challenge this week but were instead taken to Salon Le Point for their makeovers, where they received new looks to enhance their modeling potential. Reactions to the transformations varied, with some contestants embracing their new styles while others struggled to adjust. Later, the models participated in a themed photo shoot at Hong San See, where they were tasked with embodying each of the twelve animals of the Chinese zodiac. The shoot required them to channel the essence of their assigned animal while maintaining high-fashion poses, testing both their creativity and versatility. At judging, Helena received best picture. Aastha and Bei Si landed in the bottom two, and Bei Si was eliminated from the competition.: Special guests: Phisit Jongnarangsin, Saksit Pisalasupongs; Featured photographer: Akif Hakan Celebi
4	4	"Which Girl Exudes Sexy?"	16 December 2012
The eleven models participated in a challenge where they were instructed to incorporate everyday objects into their modeling poses, testing their creativity and ability to make unconventional props look high fashion. The winner of the challenge received a luxury dinner experience alongside the mentors, providing an opportunity for valuable industry insights. Later, the models took part in a high-energy photo shoot, posing as boxer athletes alongside male model Jason Godfrey. The shoot required them to exude strength, confidence, and agility while maintaining a striking editorial presence. At judging, Sofia received best picture. Filantropi and Jee landed in the bottom two, and were both eliminated, much to the other contestants' surprise.: Special guest: Jason Godfrey; Featured photographer: Todd Anthony Tyler
5	5	"Style & Taste"	23 December 2012
The nine models had a challenge, in which they were split into groups of three and assigned to style themselves in different categories. Later, the models traveled to Batam, and had to pose as a French Riviera woman.: Special guest: Jeannie Mai; Featured photographer: Chuck Reyes
6	6	"Good Hair Day"	30 December 2012
The eight models took part in a hair tutorial and were asked to write their own scripts and later film a commercial for TRESemmé. Later, the models had a beauty shoot for TRESemmé.: Special guest: Andrea Claire; Featured photographer: Zhang Jingna
7	7	"Face Value"	6 January 2013
The seven models were given a tutorial on runway makeup, and for their challenge they had to recreate the look created in the makeup tutorial. With the challenge winner, winning a pampering spa treatment at Resorts World Sentosa. Later, the models shot a campaign for World Wide Fund for Nature.: Special guest: Elaine Tan; Featured photographer: Kevin Ou
8	8	"Mannerism & The Big Red Dress"	13 January 2013
The six models were instructed on a mini-challenge on etiquette, then the main challenge was a red carpet event for fashion label Farah Khan. With the challenge winner, winning a dinner treatment with Farah Khan. Later, the models modeled a dress with a long train at Universal Studios Singapore.: Special guests: Farah Khan, George Young, Yuan Sng; Featured photographer: Toon Liang
9	9	"Beyond Comfort"	20 January 2013
The six models shot a TV commercial for Playboy fragrances alongside a male model. With the challenge winner, winning a Playboy hamper, an exclusive perfume with Swarovski elements, winning an unaired daytrip to Universal Studios Singapore, and an extra 15 minutes on the next photo shoot session. Later, the models embody as mermaids in an underwater photo shoot while wearing designs from Michael Cinco.: Special guests: Fons Houtkamp, Lauren Clarke Jensen, Michael Cinco; Featured photographer: Aaron Wong
10	10	"Girls on the Move"	27 January 2013
The five remaining models filmed a motion editorial for Subaru's sports utility vehicle Subaru XV. With the challenge winner, winning a Subaru package and a $1,000 shopping spree at Tyan Boutique at the ION Orchard. Later, the models had to portray extreme emotions in a black-and-white photo shoot.: Special guests: Glenn Tan, Paula Taylor, Sheena Seah; Featured photographer: Todd Anthony Tyler
11	11	"The Story So Far - The Road To Top 4"	3 February 2013
This episode showed previously unseen footage and recapped the first ten weeks of the competition.
12	12	"Hong Kong Extravaganza"	10 February 2013
The four remaining models traveled overseas to Hong Kong, where they attended go-sees for the week's challenge. With the challenge winner, winning a two-night stay at Hotel Mira. Later, the models portrayed 1920s-inspired modern Chinese screen goddesses in the streets of Hong Kong.: Special guests: Cara Grogan, Christelle Simeon, Dirk Dalichau, Fons Houtkamp, Jane Lombard, Jing Wong, Jonathan Li, Sue Ng, Wendy Mak; Featured photographer: Akif Hakan Celebi
13	13	"Season 1 Finale"	17 February 2013
The three remaining models filmed a commercial for Canon IXUS and a cover shoot for Harper's Bazaar Singapore. They later walked in a fashion show together with previously eliminated contestants. At panel, the judging panelists was joined by America's Next Top Model presenter Tyra Banks and other guest judges for the final deliberation. The Judges mentioned Kate's improvement of the pictures but criticized her commercial and runway walk, while they were split between Jessica's performance & Stephanie's potential. After the judges reviewed the progression of the three finalists, Jessica Amornkuldilok was crowned the first winner of Asia's Next Top Model.: Special guests: Carol Lim, Frederick Lee, Kenneth Goh, Marina Fairfax, Sophie Sumner, Tyra Banks; Featured photographer: Todd Anthony Tyler

== Results ==
Order	Episodes											
Order	1	2 (Note: In episode 2, Monica withdrew from the competition due to a family emergency. Jee and Stephanie landed in the bottom two and neither of them were eliminated due to Monica's withdrawal. Rachel was absent and safe for that week's elimination after having fainted at panel.)	3	4 (Note: In episode 4, Filantropi and Jee landed in the bottom two and both of them were eliminated.)	5	6	7	8 (Note: In episode 8, Sofia and Stephanie landed in the bottom two and neither of them were eliminated.)	9	10	12	13
1	Helena	Aastha	Helena	Sofia	Kate	Sofia	Jessica	Jessica	Jessica	Jessica	Kate	Jessica
2	Stephanie	Sofia	Stephanie	Aastha	Aastha	Jessica	Stephanie	Kate	Sofia	Kate	Jessica	Kate; Stephanie
3	Rachel	Jessica	Jee	Stephanie	Jessica	Stephanie	Kate	Aastha	Kate	Sofia	Stephanie	Kate; Stephanie
4	Trang	Helena	Rachel	Kate	Helena	Aastha	Aastha	Helena	Aastha	Stephanie	Sofia	
5	Jessica	Kate	Filantropi	Melissa	Rachel	Melissa	Sofia	Sofia; Stephanie	Stephanie	Aastha		
6	Aastha	Trang	Sofia	Jessica	Stephanie	Helena	Helena	Sofia; Stephanie	Helena			
7	Monica	Bei Si	Melissa	Rachel	Sofia	Kate	Melissa					
8	Filantropi	Melissa	Jessica	Helena	Melissa	Rachel						
9	Bei Si	Filantropi	Kate	Trang	Trang							
10	Kate	Jee; Stephanie	Trang	Filantropi; Jee								
11	Sofia	Jee; Stephanie	Aastha	Filantropi; Jee								
12	Jee	Rachel	Bei Si									
13	Melissa	Monica										
14	Kyla											

The contestant was eliminated
The contestant quit the competition
The contestant was absent at elimination and was safe
The contestant was part of a non-elimination bottom two
The contestant won the competition

== Makeovers ==
- Aastha: Rihanna inspired cut
- Bei Si: Cut to neck length with bangs and dyed blue black
- Filantropi: Bob cut with bangs and dyed deep red
- Helena: Victoria Beckham inspired bob cut with blonde highlights
- Jee: Trimmed with bangs and dyed light red
- Jessica: Cut short and dyed chestnut brown
- Kate: Layered and dyed honey blonde
- Melissa: Cut to shoulder length with bangs and dyed brown with highlights
- Rachel: Selita Ebanks inspired cut and dyed dark brown
- Sofia: Dyed jet black
- Stephanie: Volumized curls and dyed dark red
- Trang: Cut shorter
