= Jodilly Pendre =

Filipino fashion model

- Born: Jodilly Pendre; April 29, 1993 (age 33); Mandaluyong, Philippines
- Citizenship: Philippines
- Occupation: Fashion model
- Years active: 2014–present
- Modeling information
- Height: 1.78 m (5 ft 10 in)
- Hair color: Black
- Eye color: Brown
- Agency: Diva Dubai

Jodilly Pendre (born April 29, 1993 in the Philippines) is a Filipino fashion model and television personality. She is best known for her appearance as a contestant in the second season of Asia's Next Top Model, where she represented the Philippines.

== Early life ==
She began her career in modeling when she joined an in-campus beauty pageant, the 2011 search for Ideal Thomasian Personalities. She did not win the title, however, after the pageant, managed to land bigger modeling gigs, including a part in Philippine Fashion Week.

Pendre has also been featured in the pages of several fashion magazines, including a fashion editorial for Preview Magazine's August 2013 issue. She was also featured in the campaign for designer Rajo Laurel's Holiday 2012 Hanami shoe collection for major brand Parisian.

== Asia's Next Top Model ==
Pendre was one of the representatives in the second season of Asia's Next Top Model.

On the show, Pendre was one of the favored models. She was praised for her graceful runway walk, and for her outstanding performances in the shoots, impressing the judges especially judge, Joey Mead-King. She became a brand ambassador of Subaru along with Natalie Pickles where she won the challenge and was chosen by the undercover judge Mr. Glenn Tan of Subaru. Pendre lost the competition to 22-year-old model Sheena Liam thus, becoming the runner-up of the competition.

Awards and achievements
| Preceded by (Philippines) Stephanie Retuya (Taiwan) Kate Ma | Asia's Next Top Model; Runner-up; 2014 (season 2) | Succeeded by (Philippines) Monika Sta. Maria |
