= Storm Management =

British modeling agency

Storm Model Management Limited
- Trade name: Storm Management
- Type: Private
- Industry: Fashion
- Founded: 1987
- Founder: Sarah Doukas
- Headquarters: 5 Jubilee Place, Chelsea, London, England
- Services: Fashion model management, intellectual property services
- Website: stormmanagement.com

Storm Management is a British model agency based in Chelsea, London.

== Background ==
Storm was founded in 1987 by Sarah Doukas in London. Doukas discovered Kate Moss, Cara Delevingne, Behati Prinsloo, and Anya Taylor-Joy. Storm represented socialite Annabelle Neilson from 2007 until her death in 2018. In 2009, Doukas sold a controlling stake in the company to 19 Entertainment. Doukas and her brother Simon Chambers continue to run the business. Their sister was actress Emma Chambers known for The Vicar of Dibley fame.

== Fashion models and celebrities represented ==
- Adesuwa Aighewi
- Bianca Balti
- Monica Bellucci
- Kate Bock
- Cindy Bruna
- Carla Bruni
- Michael Bublé
- Estelle Chen
- Alexa Chung
- Cindy Crawford
- Charlotte D'Alessio
- Cintia Dicker
- Natalie Dormer
- Anna Ewers
- Ayu Gani
- Rose Hanbury
- Leonie Hanne
- Sui He
- Riley Keough
- Karolina Kurkova
- Chloe Lloyd
- Rebecca Leigh Longendyke
- Vanessa Moody
- Annabelle Neilson
- Caroline Brasch Nielsen
- Felice Noordhoff
- Giselle Norman
- Tom Odell
- Oluchi Onweagba
- Anita Pallenberg
- Joey Paras
- Soo Joo Park
- Andreja Pejic
- Yasmin Pettet
- Morgane Polanski
- Lady Delphi Primrose
- Behati Prinsloo
- Meghan Roche
- Jasmine Sanders
- Josephine Skriver
- Mimi Slinger
- Carmen Solomons
- Lady Kitty Spencer
- Julia Stegner
- Fran Summers
- Fei Fei Sun
- Hero Fiennes Tiffin
- Emma Watson
- Alek Wek
- Liu Wen
- Tami Williams
- Holly Willoughby
- Lady Amelia Windsor
- Lindsey Wixson
- Wizkid
- Maureen Wroblewitz

== See also ==
- List of modeling agencies
- Simon Fuller
