= Edna (given name) =

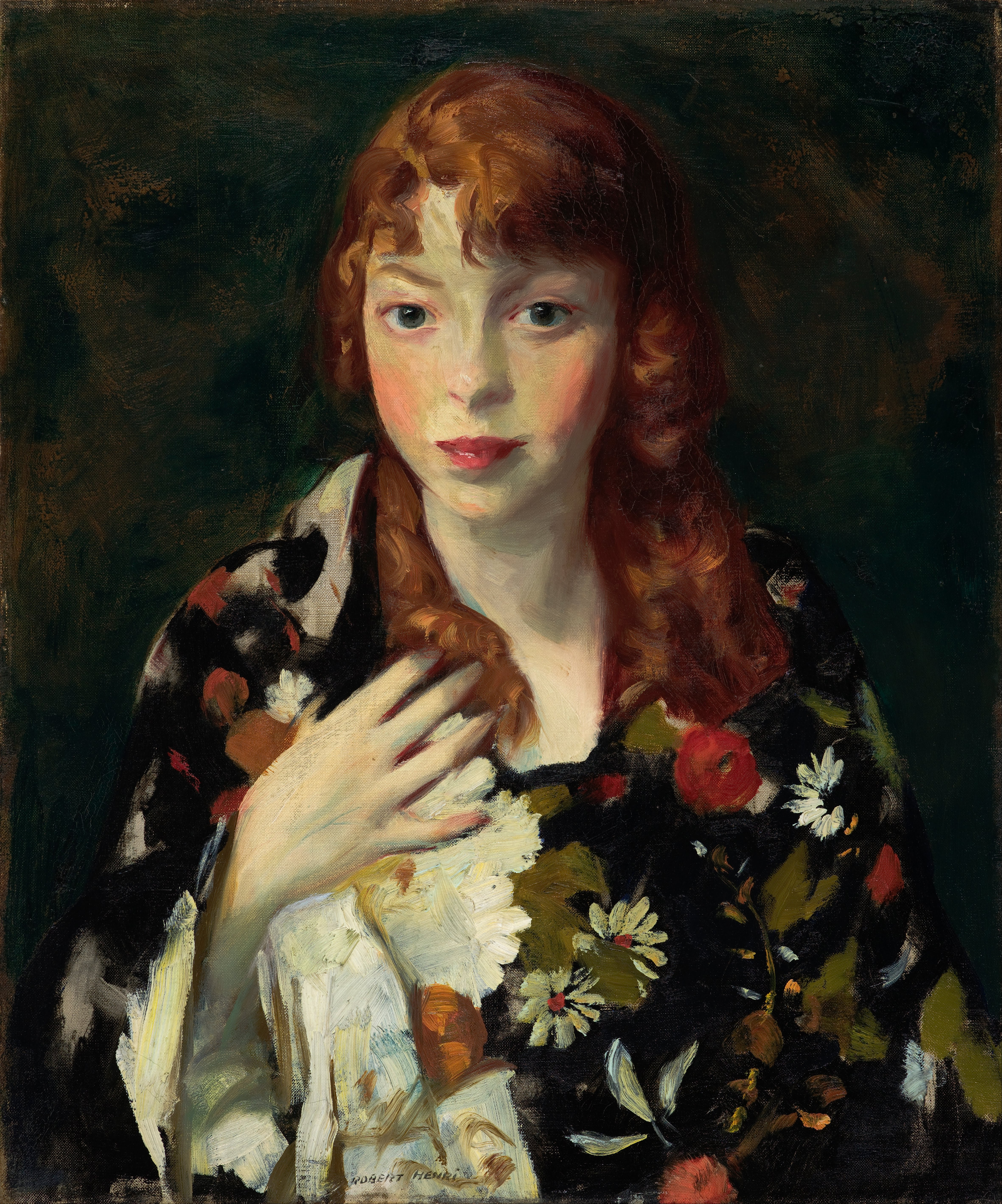
- Edna Smith in a Japanese Wrap, by Robert Henri, 1915.
- Gender: Feminine
- Language: Hebrew

Origin
- Meaning: pleasure, delight

Other names
- Alternative spelling: Ednah
- Related names: Eden

Edna (Hebrew: עֶדְנָה) is a feminine given name originating from several languages. In Hebrew, it means "pleasure, delight". The name appears in the Biblical apocryphal Book of Tobit as the mother of Sarah and mother in law of Tobias. In Ireland, the name has been used as an Anglicized form of the Irish name Eithne. It is etymologically related to the name Eden. It has been in use in the Anglosphere since the 1600s, when it was often spelled Ednah. The name was particularly well-used in the late 19th and early 20th centuries, but has since declined in use.

== People with the given name Edna ==
- Edna Agravante (born 1980), Filipina former international footballer
- Edna Alexander (died 1913), Canadian-born soprano
- Edna Belle Alexander (1892–1972), American composer
- Edna Alford (born 1947), Canadian author and illustrator
- Edna Allyn (1861–1927), American librarian
- Edna P. Amidon (1895–1982), American educator and federal official
- Edna Anderson (1922–2019), Canadian politician
- Edna Andrade (1917–2008), American abstract artist
- Edna Andrews, American academic
- Edna Anhalt (1914–1987), American screenwriter, television writer, and film producer
- Edna Arbel (born 1944), Israeli lawyer and former Israeli Supreme Court Justice
- Edna Anne Wheeler Ballard (1886–1971), American theosopher
- Edna Barker (1936–2019), English cricketer
- Edna Yolani Batres (born 1967), Honduran politician
- Theodora Bean (born Edna Belle Bean; 1871–1926), American journalist and suffragist
- Edna Beard (1877–1928), American politician
- Edna Gertrude Beasley (1892–1955), American writer and memoirist
- Edna Beilenson (1909–1981), American typographer, fine press printer, typesetter, book designer, cook book author, and publisher
- Edna Bejarano (born 1951), Israeli singer
- Edna Bessell (born 1946), English former international lawn bowler
- Edna Best (1900–1974), British actress
- Edna Libby Beutenmüller (1872–1934), American scientific illustrator
- Jean Edna Blackburn (1919–2001), Australian educationalist
- Edna Lee Booker (1897–1994), American journalist
- Edna A. Boorady (1921–2008), American lawyer and diplomat
- Edna Ermyntrude Bourne, Barbadan politician
- Edna Bourque (1915–2012), Canadian volunteer
- Edna Buchanan (born 1938), American journalist and mystery novelist
- Edna Brown (1940–2022), American politician
- Ellen Burstyn (born Edna Rae Gillooly; born 1932), American actress
- Edna Butfield, British speech and language therapist
- Edna Carrillo (born 1991), Mexican judoka
- Edna Woolman Chase (1877–1957), American magazine
- Edna Chepngeno (born 1977), Kenyan former volleyball player
- Edna Child (1922–2023), British diver and Olympian
- Edna Christofferson (1886–1945), American aviator, markswoman, and radiographer
- Edna Cintrón (1954–2001), American office worker who died in the September 11 attacks
- Edna Cisneros (1930–2013), American lawyer
- Edna Sarah Cole (1855–1950), American Presbyterian Church missionary in Siam (now Thailand)
- Edna Coll (1906–2002), Puerto Rican educator and author
- Edna Gallmon Cooke (1917–1967), American gospel singer and recording artist
- Edna Mae Cooper (1900–1986), American silent film actress
- Edna Cukierman, Mexican biochemist and academic
- Edna Cain Daniel (1875–1957), American journalist and publisher
- Edna Meade Colson (1888–1985), American educator
- Edna Davey (1909–2000), Australian freestyle swimmer and Olympian
- Edna Davies (1905–1969), British stage and film actress
- Edna Davis (1907–1989), Australian entertainer and performer, and notorious vexatious litigant.
- Edna de Lima (1879–1968), American lyric soprano singer and translator
- Edna Deakin (1871–1946), American designer
- Edna Deane (1905–1995), English ballroom dancer, choreographer and author
- Edna DeVries (born 1941), American politician
- Edna Reed DeWees (1921–2009), American law enforcement officer
- Edna Díaz (born 1985), Mexican taekwondo practitioner, psychologist and politician
- Edna Diefenbaker (1899–1951), first wife of the 13th Prime Minister of Canada, John Diefenbaker
- Edna Nell Doig (1915–1988), Australian army matron-in-chief
- Edna Doré (1922–2014), British actress
- Edna Duge (1902–1985), American educator
- Edna Dummerth (1924–2017), American baseball player
- Edna Mae Durbin (1921–2013), Canadian-born American singer and actress known professionally as Deanna Durbin
- Edna Park Edwards (c. 1895–1967), American screen actress
- Edna Eicke (1919–1979), American illustrator
- Edna Elias (born c. 1955), Canadian politician
- Edna Elliott-Horton (1904–1994), Sierra Leonan academic and activist
- Edna L. Emme (1899–1995), American cosmetologist
- Edna H. Fawcett (1879–1960), American botanist
- Edna Ferber (1885–1968), American novelist
- Edna Foa (born 1937), Israeli academic
- Edna Lois Foley (1878–1943), American nurse
- Edna Foster (1900–?), American actress
- Edna Giles Fuller (1874–1952), American politician
- Edna Garabedian, American operatic mezzo-soprano, voice teacher, and opera director
- Edna Fischel Gellhorn (1878–1970), American suffragist and reformer
- Edna Ginesi (1902–2000), British painter
- Edna Gladney (1886–1961), American children's rights activist
- Edna Gleason (1886–1963), American pharmacist and fair trade activist
- Edna Goodrich (1883–1971), American actress and author
- Edna Golandsky, American classical music pianist and educator
- Edna Griffin (1909–2000), American civil rights activist
- Edna Gross (1910–1999), British gymnast and Olympian
- Edna Grossman, German-born American mathematician
- Edna Gundersen, American journalist
- Edna Guy (1907–1982), American modern dance pioneer
- Edna Clarke Hall (1879–1979), English a watercolour artist, etcher, lithographer and draughtsman
- Edna Mae Harris (1914–1987), American actress and singer
- Eden Hartford (born Edna Higgins; 1930–1983), American film actress
- Edna Haviland (1896–1981), Canadian industrial chemist
- Edna Healey (1918–2010), British writer, lecturer and filmmaker
- Edna Frances Heidbreder (1890–1985), American philosopher and psychologist
- Edna Miller Hennessee (1919–2011), American businesswoman
- Edna Hibbard (1894–1942), American stage and motion picture actress
- Edna Hicks (c. 1891 or 1895–1925), American blues singer and musician
- Edna Hibel (1917–2014), American artist
- Edna Holland (1895–1982), American actress
- Edna Wallace Hopper (1872–1959), American stage and silent film actress
- Edna Howland (1886–1964), American vaudeville artist
- Edna Hughes (1916–1990), English competitive swimmer and Olympian
- Edna Mayne Hull (1905–1975), Canadian science fiction writer
- Jane Edna Hunter (1882–1971), American social worker
- Edna Hunter (1876–1920), American stage and silent film actress
- Edna Iles (1905–2003), English classical pianist
- Edna Imade (born 2000), Spanish professional footballer
- Edna Indermaur (1892–1985), American contralto
- Edna Adan Ismail (Born 1937), Somali foreign Minister, Midwife, FGM abolitionist and former First first lady of Somaliland
- Edna Iturralde (born 1948), Ecuadorian author
- Edna Branch Jackson (born 1944), American politician
- Edna Burke Jackson (1911–2004), American educator and wtiter
- Edna Davis Jackson (born 1950), American Tlingit artist
- Edna Jaques (1891–1978), Canadian poet
- Edna Jessop (1926–2007), Australian drover
- Edna Buckman Kearns (1882–1934), American suffragist
- Edna Keeley (1884–1961), American stage and silent film actress
- Ruth Edna Kelley (1893–1982), American librarian and writer
- Edna F. Kelly (1906–1997), American politician
- Edna Kenton (1876–1954), American writer and literary critic
- Edna Kiplagat (born 1979), Kenyan professional long-distance runner
- Edna Kramer (1902–1984), American mathematician
- Edna Moscelyne Larkin (1925–2012), American ballerina
- Edna Lawrence 1916–2015), American modelnand filmmactress
- Edna Leedom (1896–1937), American actress
- Edna Lewis (1916–2006), African-American chef
- Edna Blanchard Lewis (876–1933), American insurance broker
- Edna Loftus (1891–1916), British actress
- Edna Longley (born 1940), Irish literary critic and cultural commentator
- Edna Luby (1884–1928), American actress and comedian
- Edna Lumb (1931–1992), British artist
- Edna Machirori, Zimbabwean journalist
- Edna Ahgeak MacLean (born 1944), American Iñupiaq academic administrator, linguist, anthropologist and educator from Alaska,
- Edna Madzongwe (born 1943), Zimbabwean politician
- Edna Maison (1892–1946), American silent film actress
- Edna Malone (1899–?), Canadian dancer
- Edna Manley (1900–1987), Jamaican sculptor
- Edna Mann (1926–1985), British painter
- Edna Manning (born 1942), American educator
- Edna Marion (1906–1957), American silent film actress
- Edna Maskell (1928–2018), Rhodesian hurdler
- Edna May (1878–1948), American actress and singer
- Edna Mayo (1895–1970), American silent film actress
- Edna Mazia (1949–2023), Israeli playwright, author, screenwriter, and director
- Edna McClure (c. 1888–?), American stage actress
- Edna McGriff (1935–1980), American rhythm and blues singer and pianist
- Edna Rankin McKinnon (1893–1978), American social activist for birth control
- Edna L. McRae (1901–1990), American dancer, choreographer and dance teacher
- Edna Greene Medford, American academic
- Edna Merey-Apinda (born 1976), Gabonese writer
- Edna Zyl Modie (1886–1991), American painter
- Edna Molewa (1957–2018), South African politician
- Edna Morton (1894–1980), American actress
- Edna Mosher (1878–1972), Canadian entomologist and lepidopterist
- Edna Mosley (1899–1954), British architect
- Edna Munsey (1891–1951), American stage actress
- Edna Murphey, American businesswoman
- Edna Murphy (1899–1974), American silent film actress
- Edna Murray (1898–1966), American criminal
- Edna Nahshon, American academic
- Edna Neillis (1953–2015), Scottish women's association football player
- Dame Edna O'Brien (1930–2024), Irish writer
- Evi Edna Ogholi (born 1966), Nigerian reggae musician
- Edna May Oliver (1883–1942), American stage and film actress
- Edna O'Shaughnessy (1924–2022), South African-born British Kleinian psychoanalyst
- Edna Owen (1859–1936), American suffragist
- Edna Pahewa (born 1954), New Zealand weaver
- Edna Paisano (1948–2014), American Nez Perce and Laguna Pueblo demographer and statistician
- Edna Parker (1893–2008), American supercentenarian
- Edna G. Parker (1930–1996), American judge
- Edna Payne (1891–1953), American silent movie actress
- Edna Pearce (1906–1995), New Zealand kindergarten teacher and director, policewoman, and internment camp supervisor
- Edna Pendleton (1887–1940), American silent film actress
- Edna Pengelly (1874–1959), Canadian-born New Zealand teacher, civilian and military nurse, matron
- Edna Phillips (1907–2003), American harpist
- Edna Phillips (c. 1922–1992), British murder victim
- Edna P. Plumstead (1903–1989), South African palaeobotanist
- Edna Dean Proctor (1829–1923), American poet
- Edna Ann "Annie" Proulx (born 1935), American novelist, short story writer, and journalist
- Edna Purdie (1894–1968), British academic
- Edna Purviance (1895–1958), American actress
- Edna Moga Ramminger, Brazilian theologian and pastor
- Edna Reindel (1894–1990), American artist
- Edna Richardson (born 1949), American singer, dancer and actress
- Edna G. Riley (1880–1962), American screenwriter, author, activist, and assistant film director
- Edna Rose Ritchings (1925–2017), Canadian symbolic maintainer of the International Peace Mission religious movement
- Edna Mae Robinson (1915–2002), American dancer, actress, and activist
- Edna Roper (1913–1986), Australian politician
- Edna Ryan (née Nelson) (1904–1997), Australian feminist and labor rights activist
- Edna May Ryan (born 1946), New Zealand former cricketer
- Edna Sanchez, Filipina politician
- Edna Santini (born 1992), Brazilian rugby union and sevens player
- Edna Dee Woolford Saunders (1880–1963), American music producer and civic leader
- Edna Savage (1936–2000), British pop singer
- Edna Sayers (1912–1996), Australian cyclist
- Edna Schechtman (1948–2022), Israeli statistician
- Edna Scheer (1926–2000), American baseball player
- Edna Schmidt (1969–2021), American journalist
- Edna St. Vincent Millay (1892–1950), American poet and playwright
- Edna May Best Sexton (1880–1923), Canadian social activist and war worker
- Edna Shavit (1935–2015), Israeli academic
- Edna Shaw (1891–1974), Australian hospital matron, nurse, and midwife
- Edna Sheen (1944–2012), American makeup artist
- Edna Shemesh (born 1953), Israeli author and former journalist
- Edna Cooke Shoemaker (1889–1975), American artist and illustrator
- Edna Wilma Simons (1895–1954), American vaudeville dancer and light opera star
- Rosemary Edna Sinclair (born 1936), Australian activist and beauty pageant titleholder
- Edna Skinner (1921–2003), American film and television actress
- Edna Solodar (1930–2024), Israeli politician
- Edna May Sperl (1899–1957), American silent film actress
- Edna May Spooner (1873–1953), American actress, playwright, and vaudeville performer
- Dorothy Squires (born Edna May Squires; 1915–1998), Welsh singer
- Edna Staebler (1906–2006), Canadian writer and literary journalist
- Edna Lamprey Stantial (1897–1985), American suffragistvand archivist
- Edna Stern (born 1977), Belgian-Israeli pianist
- Edna Stillwell (1915–1982), American comedian and screenwriter
- Edna Stoddart (1888–1966), American painter and diarist
- Edna Sugathapala (1946–2018), Sri Lankan actress
- Edna Taçon (1905–1980), American-born Canadian artist
- Edna Telford (1899–?), American politician
- Edna Tepava (1955–2024), French model and beauty pageant competitor
- Edna Thomas, Papua New Guinean former footballer and current manager
- Edna Harker Thomas (1881–1942), American Church of Jesus Christ of Latter Day Saints leader
- Edna Lewis Thomas (1885–1974), American stage actress
- Edna Tichenor (1901–1965), American actress
- Beatrice Edna Tucker (c. 1897–1984), American obstetrician and gynecologist
- Edna Henry Lee Turpin (1867–1952), American author
- Edna Westbrook Trigg (1868–1946), American educator and social worker
- Edna W. Underwood (1873–1961), American author, poet, and translator
- Aunt Susan, born Edna Vance (1893–1972), American journalist and radio personality
- Edna Veiga (born 1964), Brazilian retired volleyball player
- Edna Walling (1896–1973), Australian landscape designer
- Edna Watson (1895–1976), Bermudan politician
- Edna White (1892–1992), American trumpet soloist, chamber musician, vaudeville performer, and composer
- Edna Noble White (1879–1954), American educator
- Edna Gardner Whyte (1902–1992), American aviator
- Edna Wildey (1882–1970), American tennis player
- Edna Mae Wilson (1880–1960), American silent film actress
- Edna Wilson-Mosley (1925–2014), American politician, civil rights activist, and educator
- Edna May Wonacott (1932–2022), American child actress
- Edna Wright (1945–2020), American singer
- Edna Yost (1889–1971), American writer

== People with the given name Ednah or Edana ==
- Ednah Dow Littlehale Cheney (1824–1924), American writer, reformer, and philanthropist
- Edana of Ireland (died 516), Irish monastic

== Fictional characters ==
- Edna, maid of the Birlings in the play An Inspector Calls
- Edna, the Inebriate Woman, 1971 BBC TV drama
- Edna Birch in the television series Emmerdale
- Edna Braithwaite, a maid in Downton Abbey
- Edna from Flintstones
- Dame Edna Everage
- Edna Garrett in the television series Diff'rent Strokes and The Facts of Life
- Edna Gee in the ITV soap opera Coronation Street in the 1970s
- Edna Krabappel in the television series The Simpsons
- Edna Mode, a fashion designer in the animated film The Incredibles
- Edna Pontellier in Kate Chopin's novel "The Awakening"
- Edna Spalding in the 1984 film Places in the Heart
- Edna Turnblad in the 1988 film Hairspray and subsequent adaptations as a stage musical and musical film
- Edna, a nures in the computer game Day of the Tentacle

== See also ==
- Adna (given name), which is transliterated as "Edna" in the Douay–Rheims Bible
