= Brekke =

Brekke may refer to:

== Places ==
- Brekke Municipality, a former municipality in the old Sogn og Fjordane county, Norway
- Brekke (village), a village in Gulen Municipality in Vestland county, Norway
- Brekke Church, a church in Gulen Municipality in Vestland county, Norway
- Brekke sluser, a part of the Halden Canal

== People ==
- Aslak Brekke (1901–1978), prominent vocalist of one of the Scandinavian poetic genres referred to as stev
- Birger Brekke (1891–1981), Norwegian Scout leader
- Eden T. Brekke (1893–1978), Chicago businessman and politician
- Jan Egil Brekke (born 1974), Norwegian football midfielder who currently plays for Alta IF
- Jan-Paul Brekke (born 1966), Norwegian sociologist and comedian
- Joanne Brekke (1935–2017), American politician
- Johanne Brekke, Welsh sport shooter
- Leif Arne Brekke (born 1977), Norwegian football defender who currently plays for Modum FK
- Michele Brekke, former flight director in NASA Johnson Space Center (JSC) Space Shuttle Mission Control Center
- Morten Brekke (born 1957), Norwegian former wrestler who competed in the Summer Olympics
- Paal Brekke (1923–1993), Norwegian lyricist, novelist, translator of poetry, and literary critic
- Pål Brekke (born 1961), Norwegian solar physicist astrophysicist
- Ruth Lilian Brekke (born 1938), Norwegian politician for the Conservative Party
- Sigve Brekke (born 1959), business leader and a former politician of Norwegian origin
- Toril Brekke (born 1949), Norwegian novelist, writer of short stories, children's writer, biographer, translator and literary critic
