= Eden (given name) =

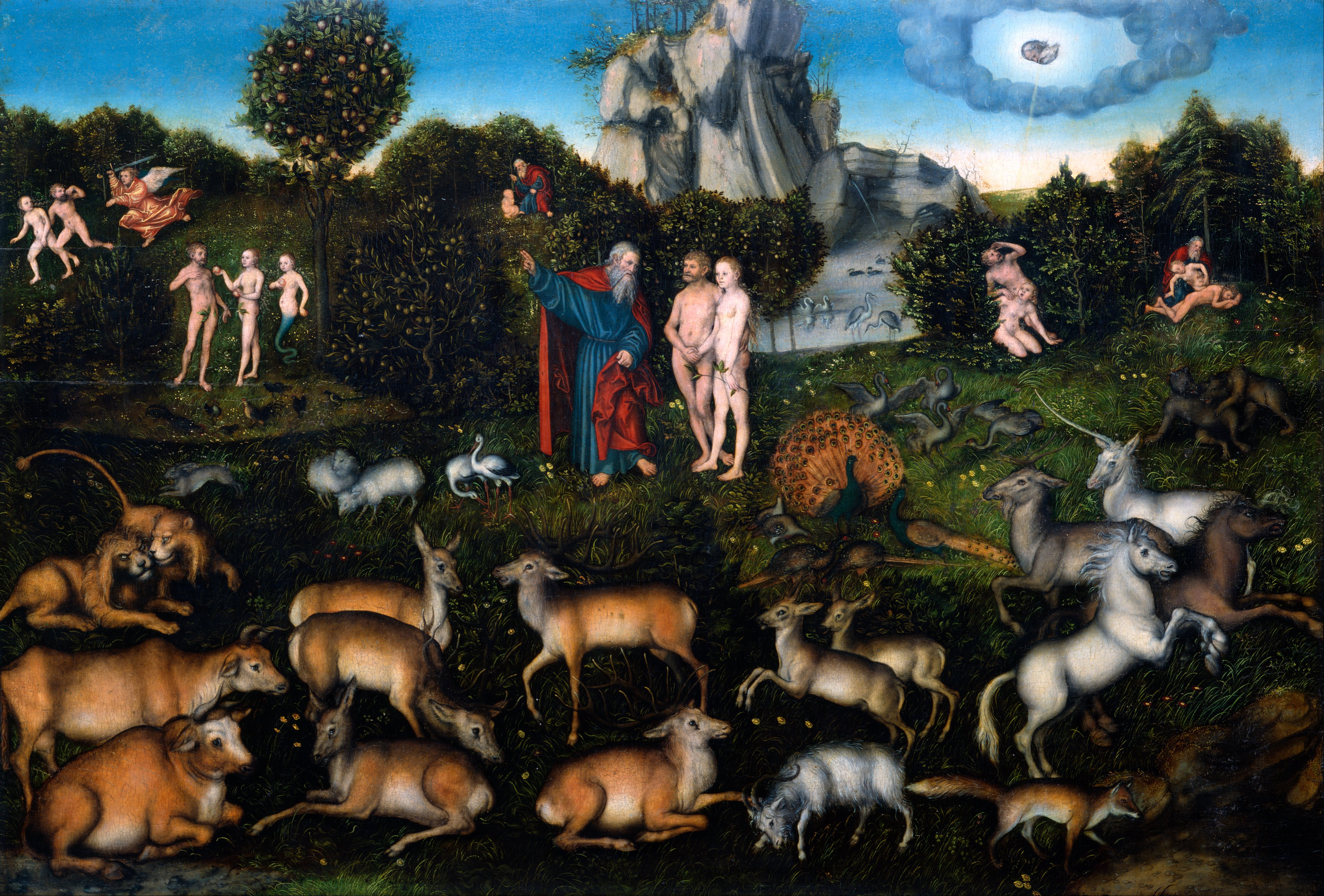
- A painting depicting The Garden of Eden
- Pronunciation: /ˈiːdən/
- Gender: unisex

Origin
- Origin: Hebrew
- Meaning: Delight

Other names
- Related names: Aidan, Edith, Edna, Edon, Edun

Eden (Hebrew: עֵדֶן), as a given name is most often given in reference to the Biblical Garden of Eden, meaning delight; it is given to boys and girls. The first recorded use is from ancient Israel in the book of Genesis. As a boy's name, it might be a variant of the name Aidan or be derived from the surname Eden, which was derived from the Old English word elements ēad, meaning wealth, and hún, meaning bear cub. The older form of the name was Edon or Edun. As an English girl's name, it also originated as a diminutive form of the name Edith that was in use in Yorkshire in the 1400s.

== Usage ==
Eden has been among the top 1,000 names in use for newborn girls in the United States since 1986. Its debut on the American popularity chart coincided with the introduction of the character Eden Capwell on the American soap opera Santa Barbara. The name has continued to increase in usage and has been among the top 150 names for newborn American girls since 2016. It has been among the 1,000 most popular names for American newborn boys since 2008. It has been among the top 500 most popular names for girls in France since 1995 and for French boys since 2005. It was among the 20 most popular names for newborn French boys in 2022. In Belgium, it has been among the top 150 names for boys since 2012 and was among the top 25 names for boys between 2014 and 2021. It has also been among the too 500 names for both boys and girls in the United Kingdom since 1996 and has been among the top 100 names for British girls since 2020. The name has been among the 100 most popular names for girls in New Zealand since 1995. It has been among the top 500 names for boys in the Netherlands since 2014 and was among the top 500 names for Dutch girls between 2011 and 2016. In Israel, the name was among the top 100 names for newborn girls between 2014 and 2020.

Notable people with the given name include:

== Men ==
- Eden Brekke (1893–1978), superintendent of Parks and Alderman of the 37th Ward, Chicago
- Eden Colvile (1819–1893), Canadian historic figure, grandson of William Eden
- Eden Hazard (born 1991), Belgian former professional footballer
- Eden Natan-Zada (1986–2005), Israeli deserter who carried out a mass murder incident
- Eden Paul, British physician and writer
- Eden Phillpotts (1862–1960), British novelist, poet, dramatist and artist

== Women ==
- Eden Alene (born 2000), Israeli singer
- Eden Bleazard (1855–1946), New Zealand artist
- Eden Brolin (born 1994), American actress and singer
- Eden Espinosa (born 1978), American singer and stage actress
- Eden Estrada, Mexican-American model and social media influencer
- Eden Golan (born 2003), Israeli singer
- Eden Harel (born 1976), MTV Europe VJ during the 1990s
- Eden Knight (2000–2023), forcibly detransitioned Saudi Arabian transgender woman who had been living in the United States prior to a coerced return to Saudi Arabia
- Eden Kuriakose, Indian film actress
- Eden Rainbow-Cooper (born 2001), English wheelchair racer
- Eden Riegel (born 1981), American actress
- Eden Sher (born 1991), American television actress
- Eden Taylor-Draper (born 1997), English actress
- Eden Ben Zaken (born 1994), Israeli singer
