= Magic for Marigold =

1929 novel by Lucy Maud Montgomery

- First edition
- Author: Lucy Maud Montgomery
- Cover artist: Edna Cooke Shoemaker
- Language: English
- Genre: Children's novel
- Publisher: McClelland & Stewart (Canada); Frederick A. Stokes (USA)
- Publication date: 1929
- Publication place: Toronto, Ontario (Canada); New York, New York (USA)
- Media type: Print (Paperback, Hardcover)
- Pages: 328
- OCLC: 29201376
- Text: Magic for Marigold online

Magic for Marigold (1929) is a novel written by Canadian author Lucy Maud Montgomery. It is an expansion of four linked short stories Montgomery wrote and originally published in 1925.

The United States copyright was renewed in 1957.

== Synopsis ==
Marigold Lesley is an imaginative young girl whose father died before she was born. She lives at her paternal relatives' estate, Cloud of Spruce. Marigold's closest family includes her loving mother, steely Young Grandmother, shrewd Old Grandmother, her Uncle Klon (short for Klondike) who is a former sailor, and her Aunt Marigold, a doctor who saved Marigold's life as a baby. The Lesleys have decided to name the child Marigold to honour the doctor's life-saving skills.

The Cloud of Spruce family makes Marigold's life pleasant, even if a little dull, but she nonetheless has her share of adventures, fancies and troubles, many related to the peculiar environment she grew up in. Marigold spends much of her childhood playing with her imaginary friend Sylvia, not ignoring other children, but she struggles to form lasting bonds.

The book relates Marigold's seemingly incurable jealousy of her father's first wife, Clementine; an encounter with a Russian princess; several attempts to be "good;" her first romance; and a surprising cooking triumph.

As Marigold grows up she maintains an unabated attachment to Sylvia, which begins to worry her family. But when a boy, nicknamed Budge, moves in next door Marigold learns to enjoy real friendship, and eventually how to share friends with other people. Marigold recognizes her time with Sylvia is not as satisfying as reality. When Sylvia ceases to appear, Marigold mourns her but knows that she can move on.
