= Adna =

ADNA or Adna may refer to:

- Adna (given name)
- A-DNA
- Adna, Washington
- Al-Tagr al-Adna, the Arabic name for the Lower March of Al-Andalus
- aDNA, ancient DNA
- Athletic DNA, apparel company
- Alternate spelling of Saint Ada
- Adna (crustacean), a genus of barnacles

== See also ==
- Arna, Norway, pronounced Ådna
