= Ednah =

Ednah is a feminine given name. Notable people with this name include:

- Ednah Robinson Aiken (1872–1960), American writer
- Ednah Dow Littlehale Cheney (1824–1904), American writer
- Ednah Kurgat (born 1991), Kenyan American athlete
- Ednah Root (1907–1987), American painter, sculptor, textile artist, and philanthropist
- Ednah Shepard Thomas (1901–1995), American college professor

== See also ==
- Edna (given name)
