= Uniroyal =

American manufacturer of tires

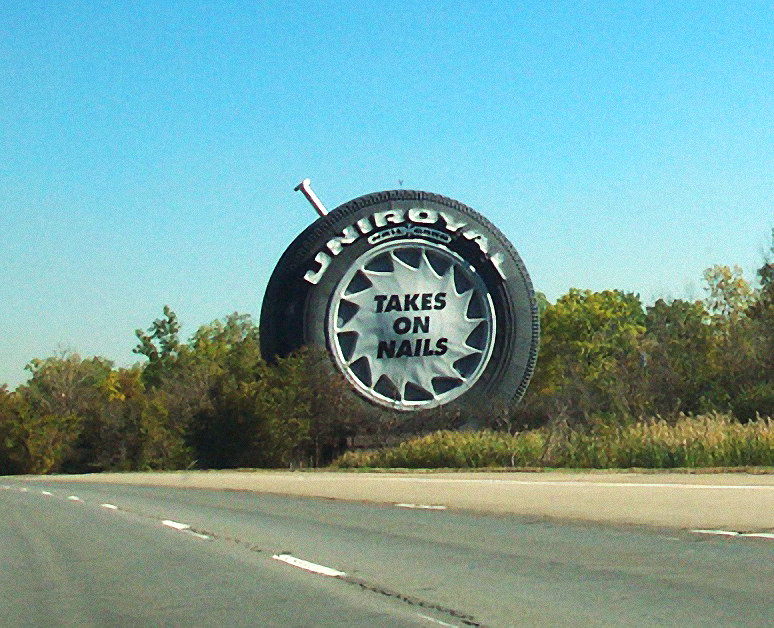
- The Uniroyal Giant Tire in Allen Park, Michigan on I-94
- Type: Subsidiary
- Traded as: NYSE: R (no longer traded)
- Industry: Automotive
- Founded: 1892
- Headquarters: Greenville, South Carolina, Naugatuck, Connecticut, USA
- Area served: North America
- Products: Tires, Footwear, Explosives, Ammunition, Chemical weapons
- Parent: Michelin (1990–present, North America); Continental AG (1979–present, rest of world)
- Website: www.uniroyaltires.com (Michelin) www.uniroyal-tyres.com (Continental)

Uniroyal, formerly known as the United States Rubber Company, is an American brand of tires for cars, trucks, minivans, and SUVs, plus other synthetic rubber-related products, as well as variety of items for military use, such as ammunition, explosives, chemical weapons and operations and maintenance activities (O&MA) at the government-owned contractor-operated facilities. It was founded in Naugatuck, Connecticut, in 1892. The brand has a separate global entity that produces vinyl-coated fabric and soft trim products. It was one of the original 12 stocks in the Dow Jones Industrial Average, and became Uniroyal, Inc., as part of creating a unified brand for its products and subsidiaries in 1961.

The company's long-lived advertisement slogan was "United States Tires are Good Tires". One of Uniroyal's best-known tires is the Tiger Paw introduced in the 1960s and included as original equipment for that decade's muscle cars such as the Pontiac GTO, which itself was promoted as The Tiger during its early years. Today, Uniroyal still uses the Tiger Paw brand name in its tire line.

In 1990, Uniroyal was acquired by French tire maker Michelin and ceased to exist as a separate business. Today around 1,000 workers in the U.S. remain employed by Michelin to make its Uniroyal brand products. While in North America, Colombia and Peru, the Uniroyal brand has been owned by Michelin since 1990, outside those regions, the Uniroyal brand has been owned by Continental AG since 1979 following their acquisition of Uniroyal Europe, formerly known as Englebert.

== Origins ==
Goodyear Metallic Rubber Shoe Company & Downtown Naugatuck (c. 1890)

By 1892, there were many rubber manufacturing companies in Naugatuck, Connecticut, as well as elsewhere in Connecticut. Nine companies consolidated their operations in Naugatuck to become the United States Rubber Company. One of the nine, Goodyear's India Rubber Glove Mfg. Co. (named Litchfield Rubber Co until 1847) – which manufactured rubber gloves for telegraph linemen – was the only company in which Charles Goodyear, inventor of the rubber vulcanization process, is known to have owned stock.

From 1892 to 1913, the rubber footwear divisions of U.S. Rubber manufactured their products under 30 different brand names, including the Wales-Goodyear Shoe Co. The company consolidated these footwear brands under one name, Keds, in 1916, and were mass-marketed as the first flexible rubber-sole with canvas-top "sneakers" in 1917.

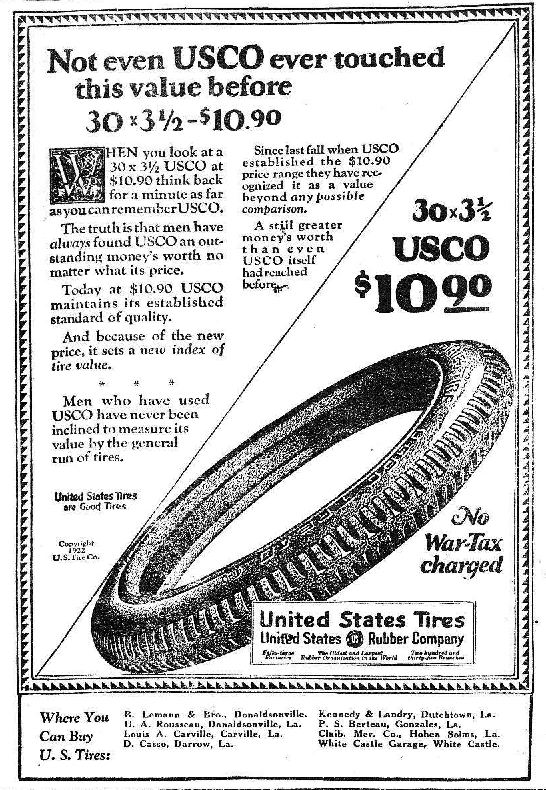
1922 US Tire newspaper ad.

On May 26, 1896, Charles Dow created the Dow Industrial average of twelve industrial manufacturing stocks, which included U.S. Rubber Company. When the average expanded to a list of 20 stocks in 1916, U.S. Rubber remained, however the listing expanded to 30 stocks in 1928 and U.S. Rubber was dropped.

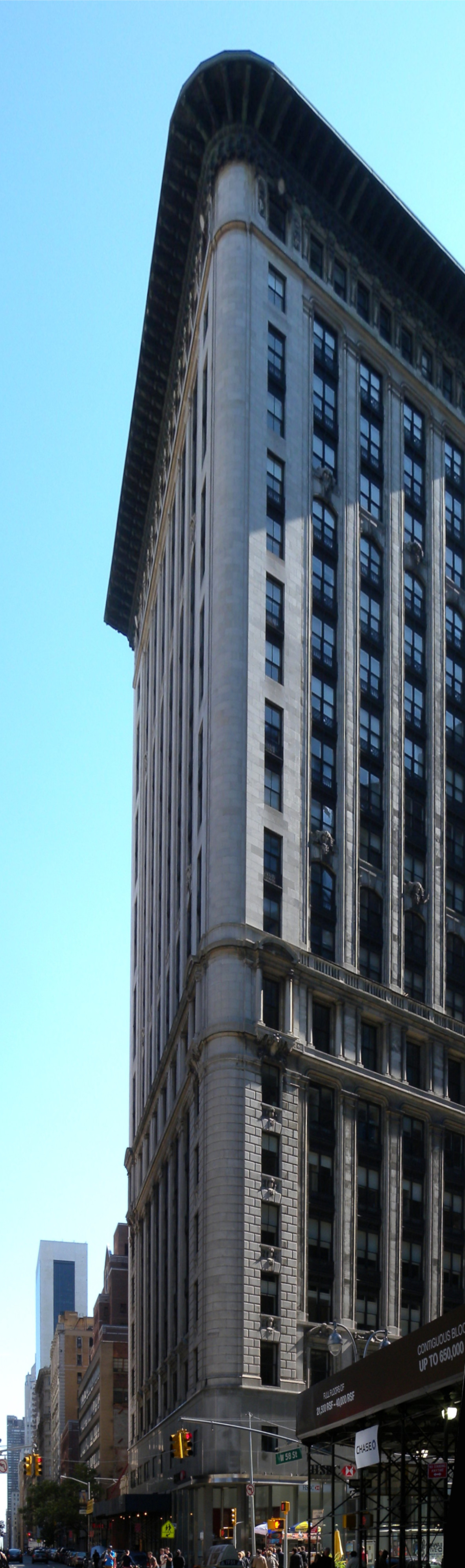
U.S. Rubber Headquarters constructed at 1790 Broadway in 1912

In an effort to increase its share of the automobile tire market in 1931, U.S. Rubber Company bought a substantial portion of the Gillette Safety Tire Company. The company was founded in 1916 by Raymond B. Gillette and its primary manufacturing plant was located in Eau Claire, Wisconsin. The Gillette plant held large contracts with the General Motors Corporation and with the addition of U.S. Rubber products, became one of the world's largest suppliers of original equipment tires. U.S. Rubber produced tires under the Gillette, Ward, Atlas, U.S. Rubber and U.S. Royal brands.

In 1940, U.S. Rubber purchased the remainder of the Gillette Safety Tire Company, and began to expand and modernize the Eau Claire factory, greatly increasing production. During World War II, U.S. Rubber factories were devoted to production of war goods, and produced military truck and airplane tires, as well as the canvas-top, rubber-soled Jungle boot for soldiers and marines serving in tropical and jungle environments. U.S. Rubber ranked 37th among United States corporations in the value of wartime production contracts.

In 1942, the United States government restricted the sale of scarce rubber products for civilian use and production at the plant dwindled. The company sold the Eau Claire plant to the government, which then converted it for the manufacture of small caliber ammunition and renamed it the Eau Claire Ordnance plant.

By December 31, 1943, the need for tires outweighed the need for ammunition. U.S. Rubber repurchased the plant from the government for more than US$1 million, and converted it back to synthetic rubber tire production. The company began an expansion and modernization program at the plant that lasted through 1951. When it ended, the Eau Claire plant was the fifth largest tire facility in the United States. The company again expanded the plant in 1965 to produce tires for construction machinery, and for many years it was the largest private employer in Eau Claire and the second largest in neighboring Chippewa Falls before it was closed in 1991.

In late 1943, U.S. Rubber engineer Dr. Louis Marick developed a propeller de-icing system in which a rubber boot was fitted onto the leading edge of a propeller. The boot contained wires that conducted electricity to heat the edge and break-up ice.

=== Englebert Company ===
In 1958, Uniroyal entered into a partnership with the Englebert tire company of Liège, Belgium, which became known as Uniroyal Englebert Deutschland AG. In 1963, the name was shortened to Uniroyal-Englebert, and in 1967 it became Uniroyal along with all company divisions. Uniroyal sold this division with its four factories in Belgium, Germany, France and Scotland to Continental AG in 1979. Continental continues to market tires under the Uniroyal brand outside NAFTA, Colombia and Peru.

=== Dominion Rubber ===
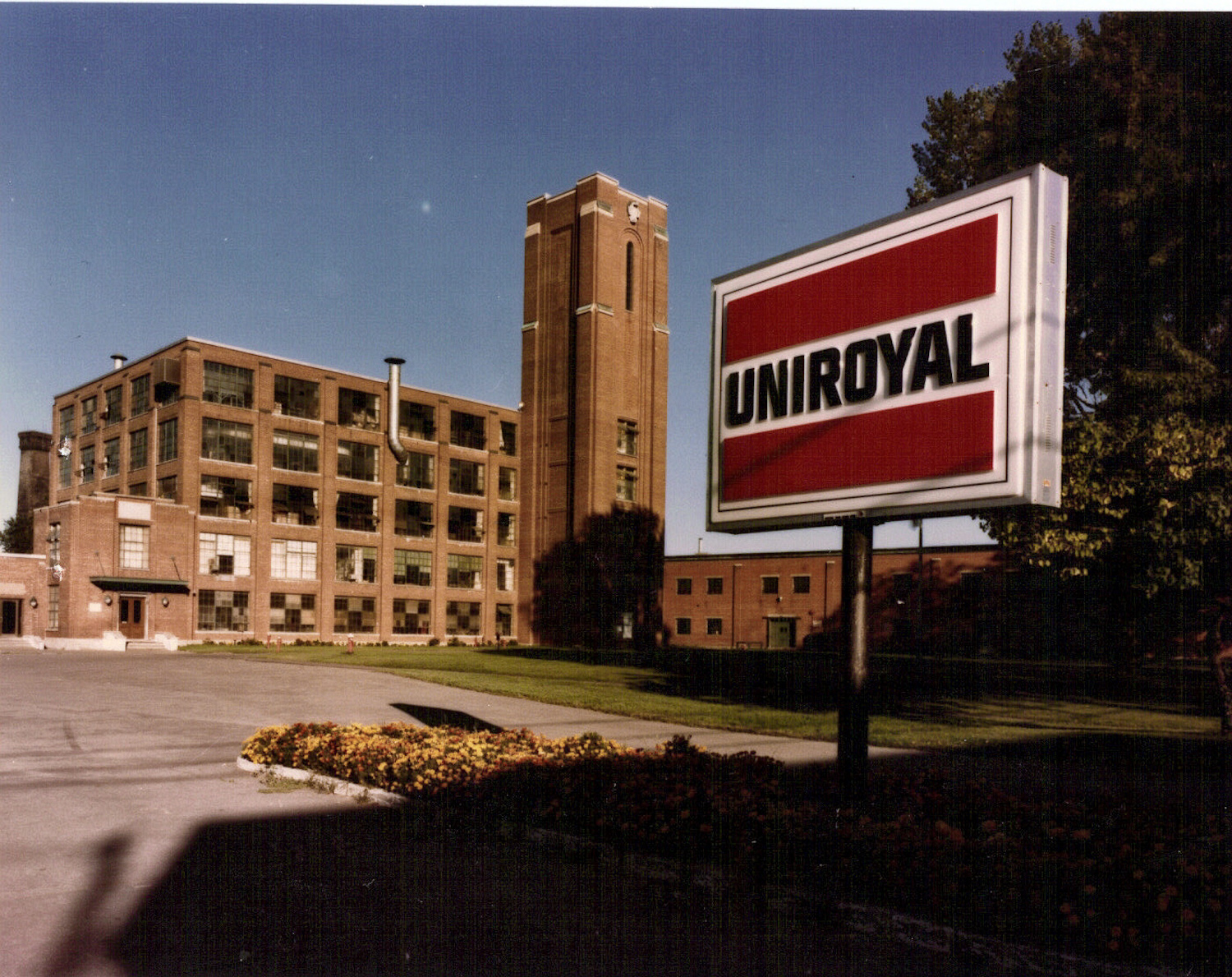
Uniroyal plant in Saint-Jérôme, Quebec, built in 1911–1930

Uniroyal operations in Canada were carried out under the name Dominion Rubber Company for a number of decades.

Dominion started operations as Brown, Hibbard and Bourne, established in 1854. In 1866, the company registered as the Canadian Rubber Company of Montreal Limited and became prosperous manufacturing waterproof cloth, rubber footwear and machinery belts. It began to produce auto tires in 1906 in its Montreal factory and through a series of mergers with other companies in Ontario and Quebec became the Canadian Consolidated Rubber Company Limited.

After another series of mergers, the company became the Dominion Rubber Company Limited in 1926. It produced footwear under a variety of brand names, coated upholstery fabrics, mechanical parts, industrial chemicals and vehicle tires. Edna Haviland, recruited in 1918, led work for the company on recipes for rubber compounds and synthetic materials used in making tyres, which was particularly important during the World War II when there were shortages of natural rubber.

In 1966, after four decades as Dominion, the company was renamed Uniroyal Ltd., along with all other company holdings, and in 1981, it was sold to Waterville Ltd.

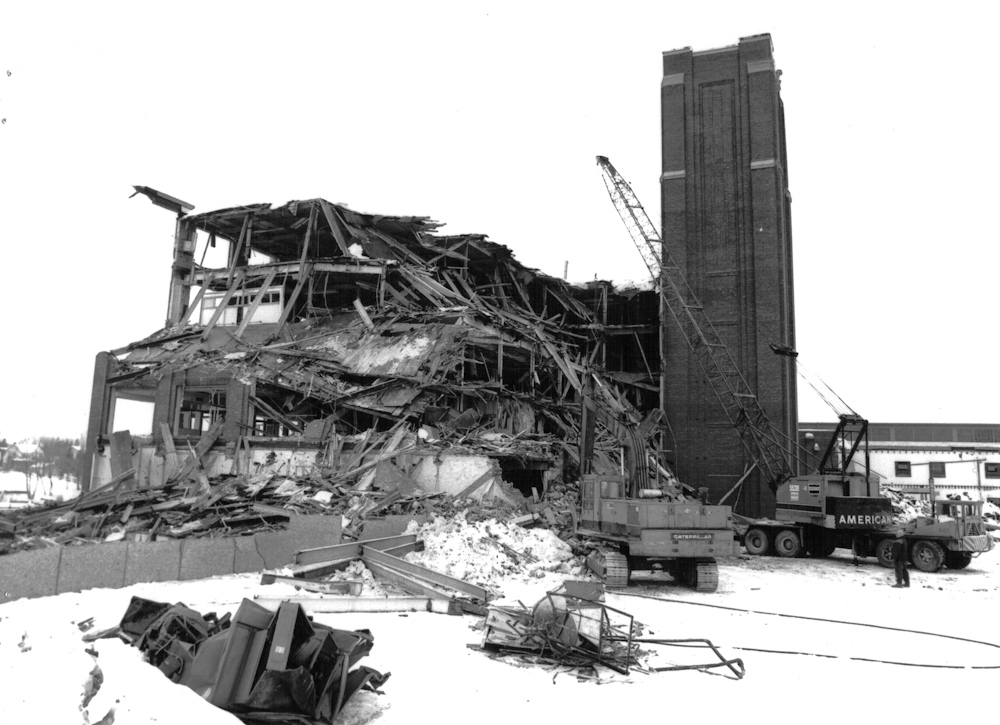
The Saint-Jérôme facility during demolition in 1994

=== S.A. Rubber ===
In 1939, Mark Lodge and Harold Hill established S. A. Rubber Mills Pty. Ltd. in Edwardstown, South Australia. The company grew until 1963 when U.S. Rubber purchased 25% of the business. By 1980, Uniroyal owned sixty percent of what was now Uniroyal Brazil which it sold to Bridgestone. The subsidiary which operated Australian plants under the name Uniroyal Tyre Company became Bridgestone Australia Ltd. and was traded on the Australian stock exchange as a majority-owned subsidiary of Japan's tire company. On March 20, 2007, stockholders of Bridgestone Australia Ltd. voted to make the company a wholly owned subsidiary of Bridgestone Corporation of Japan.(TYO: 5108)

=== Isochem ===
A joint venture, Isochem, Inc., was established in June 1965 together with Martin Marietta Corporation and chaired by the Martin's vice president Malcolm A. MacIntyre to operate Hanford nuclear site under the auspices of AEC, thus assuming duties, previously performed by the General Electric Co.

== Uniroyal ==
A Uniroyal Super Fleet truck tire

In 1961, the company became Uniroyal, Inc. The Uniroyal name was applied to all its operating components and products by 1967, creating a unified brand.

As Uniroyal in 1974, the company became defendant in a landmark gender discrimination case, Chrapliwy v. Uniroyal, under Title VII of the Civil Rights Act of 1964. The class action lawsuit was settled in favor of the plaintiffs, but the issue of attorney fees was decided by the United States Court of Appeals for the Seventh Circuit in 1982.

== Uniroyal Goodrich Tire ==
In 1985, Uniroyal was taken private by its management and the New York investment firm of Clayton, Dubilier & Rice to prevent a hostile takeover by financier Carl C. Icahn. At the time, Uniroyal was the fifth-largest tire company in the country. To help pay the nearly $1 billion in debt incurred in the leveraged buyout, the company sold its Uniroyal's Chemical subsidiary to Avery Inc. – a producer of agricultural chemicals, industrial chemical additives and specialized rubber and plastic products – for $760 million in May 1986.

The remaining tire operation was merged with that of B.F. Goodrich Company (NYSE: GR), a S&P 500-listed tire and rubber fabricator that made high-performance replacement tires. The joint venture partnership became the Uniroyal Goodrich Tire Company and B.F. Goodrich Company held a 50% stake in the new tire company.

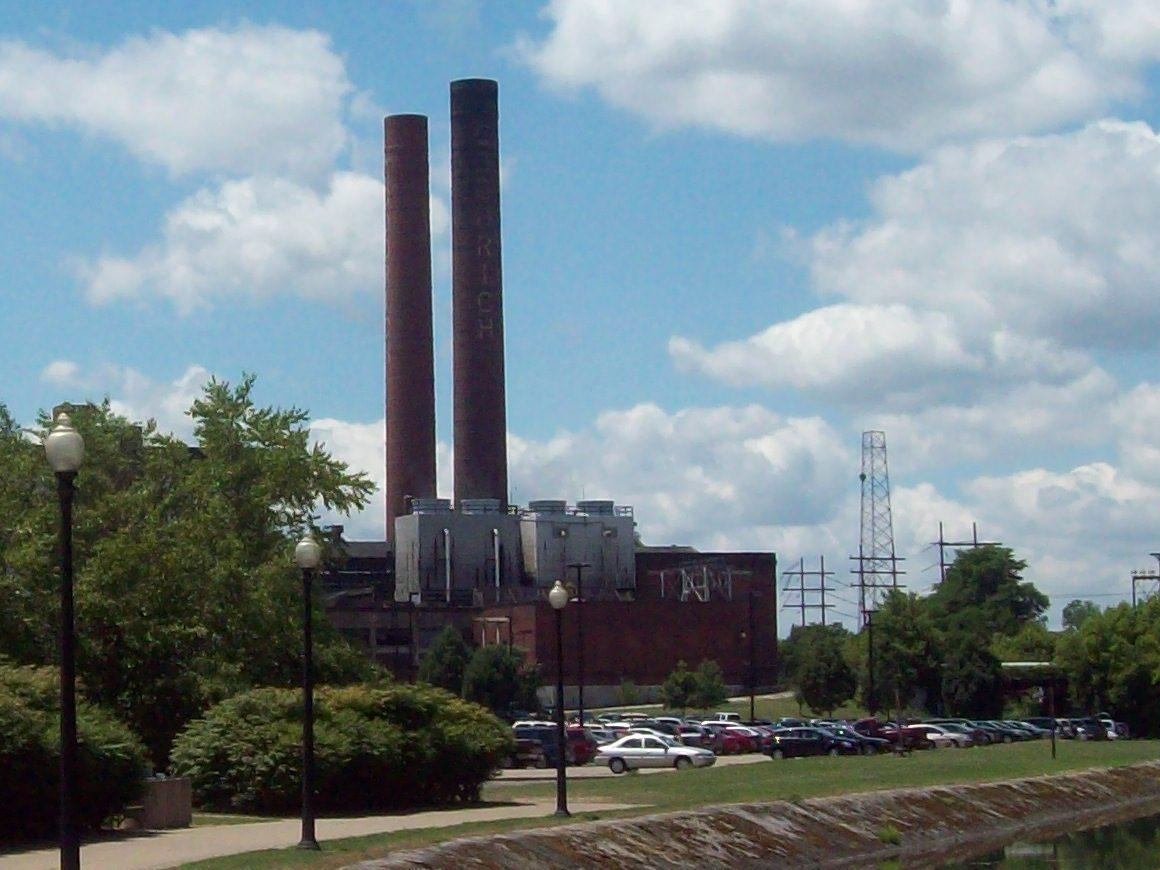
The former BFGoodrich smoke stacks at the old tire plant, and headquarters in Akron, Ohio

The new Uniroyal Goodrich Tire Company established its headquarters at the former B. F. Goodrich corporate headquarters, within its 27-building downtown complex in Akron, Ohio, which contained Goodrich's original factory. In the fall of 1987, the B.F. Goodrich Company closed several manufacturing operations at the site, and most of the complex remained vacant until February 1988, when B.F. Goodrich announced plans to sell the vacant portions of the complex to the Covington Capital Corporation, a New York developer. The complex is now known as Canal Place.

In 1987, its first full year of operation, the new Uniroyal Goodrich Tire Company generated almost US$2 billion in sales revenue, with profit of about US$35 million. However, the merger soon proved to be difficult. In June 1988, B.F. Goodrich sold its 50% stake to a group of investors led by Clayton, Dubilier & Rice for US$225 million. At the same time, B.F. Goodrich also received a warrant to purchase indirectly up to 7% of the equity in Uniroyal Goodrich Tire Company.

Also in June 1988 as part of the sale deal, the new privately held tire company acquired publicly held debt of $415 million. The Uniroyal Goodrich Tire Company offered the debt securities in two parts through underwriters led by Drexel Burnham Lambert Inc. The two instruments were a US$250 million issue of 14 1/8% notes due in 1998, and a US$165 million issue of 14 1/2% subordinated debentures due in 2000.

For the year 1988, Uniroyal Goodrich Tire posted sales revenue of US$2.2 billion, while profit declined to about a third of the prior year, less than US$12 million, which included an extraordinary credit of nearly US$2 million from the purchase of Canadian annuity pension obligations, and also a charge of over US$16 million from the June 1988 recapitalization resulting from the selloff by B.F. Goodrich.

Also in 1988, Michelin Group, a subsidiary of the French tire company Michelin et Cie (Euronext Paris: ML ) proposed to acquire the Uniroyal Goodrich Tire Company, and began acquiring a stake.

In 1989, Uniroyal Goodrich Tire Company posted sales revenue that was up to almost US$2.3 billion, but profit was down by 90% to just over US$1 million, but included over US$9 million extraordinary credit that year for the ongoing Canadian annuity pension obligation purchase. 1989 year-end net income results were also hurt by increased interest expense of nearly US$31 million on the June 1988 debt recapitalization, and a US$29 million charge for deferred employee compensation related to the proposed purchase of the company by Michelin Group.

== Michelin Group ==
By May 1990, Michelin Group completed its purchase of Uniroyal Goodrich Tire Company from Clayton & Dubilier of New York. The deal was valued at about US$1.5 billion. B.F. Goodrich surrendered its 7% warrant to Michelin Group for US$32.5 million.

With the sale, B.F. Goodrich then exited the tire business and became the Goodrich Corporation to focus on building its chemicals and aerospace businesses through reinvestment and acquisitions. Michelin Group continued to operate the Uniroyal Goodrich Tire Company as its tire manufacturing unit in the United States and Canada.

In January 1991, Michelin Group closed the historic Eau Claire, Wisconsin, plant, eliminating 1,350 positions. Later in 1991 it closed the tire-cord manufacturing plant in Lindsay, Ontario, with 74 workers on August 30, 1991, due to high cost and two tire factories with 1,000 jobs in Kitchener, Ontario, citing overcapacity.

Also in 1991, the Uniroyal tiger returned to national television after a 10-year hiatus, featured in a new 30-second spot created by Wyse Advertising of Cleveland, Ohio. The animated Uniroyal tiger had been a television advertising icon for the company through the 1970s. The new commercial appeared on ESPN and CNN sports-related programming, and also was run by Uniroyal dealers in local markets.

By 1993, Michelin North America employed 28,000 people at 18 plants, in South Carolina, Alabama, Oklahoma, Indiana, Nova Scotia and Ontario. In mid-1993, Michelin North America cut 2,500 of those jobs, which represented about 9% of its work force in the United States and Canada, because of softening demand for tires. As of 2010, the Uniroyal Goodrich Tire unit continued to operate with about 1,000 workers at its tire plant in Woodburn, Indiana, and another plant in Tuscaloosa, Alabama. Citing overcapacity in the North American tire market, the plant in Opelika, Alabama, closed in 2009.

In June 2026, the former holding company was placed into Chapter 11 bankruptcy protection.

== Archival material ==
The Uniroyal, Inc Records are held by the Special Collections and Archives Department at University of Wisconsin-Eau Claire. Comprising contract negotiation and grievance case files, meeting minutes, memos, correspondence, photos and audio visual material, the records document numerous activities including: the collective bargaining activities of Local 19 of the United Rubber Workers of America, the impact on plant operations by the introduction of synthetic rubber production, and work modernization after World War II. The Department is also home to the Uniroyal Collection, which includes news clippings and photos, and well as the United Rubber, Cork, Linoleum, and Plastic Workers of America. Local 19: Records, which reflect the work of the labour union that represented the employees at the Uniroyal Goodrich Tire Company's Eau Claire plant.

Records and photographs pertaining to the Rubber Machinery Shops of the Dominion Tire Co. Ltd, in Kitchener, Ontario are housed in Special Collections & Archives at the University of Waterloo Library. Included are photographs, newsletters, equipment lists, press releases and news clippings regarding employees and company operations.

United States Rubber Company records at Baker Library Special Collections, Harvard Business School.
