= TRESemmé =

Brand of hair care products

TRESemmé Professional
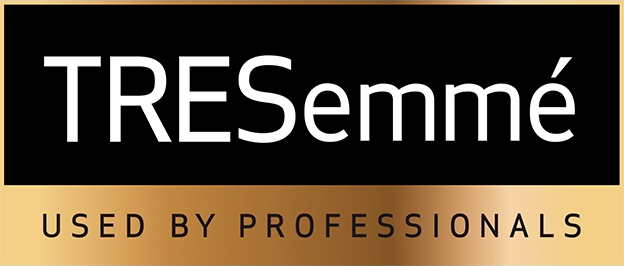
- Product type: Hair care
- Current owner: Unilever
- Produced by: Godefroy Manufacturing Company (1947–1968); Alberto-Culver (1968–2010); Unilever (2010–present)
- Country: United States
- Introduced: 1947; 79 years ago
- Markets: Worldwide
- Previous owners: Godefroy Manufacturing Company (1947–1968); Alberto-Culver (1968–2010)
- Tagline: Professional. Affordable. Used By Professionals
- Website: www.tresemme.com/uk

TRESemmé is a brand of hair care products first manufactured in 1947 by the Godefroy Manufacturing Company in Manhattan, New York City, New York, United States. It was named after the renowned hair care expert Edna L. Emme. The brand name is a phonetic respelling of "beloved" (French: très-aimé) that includes the surname of its namesake.

The TRESemmé product line was initially marketed only to beauty salons. The TRESemmé brand was purchased by Alberto-Culver in 1968, and then acquired by Unilever in 2010.

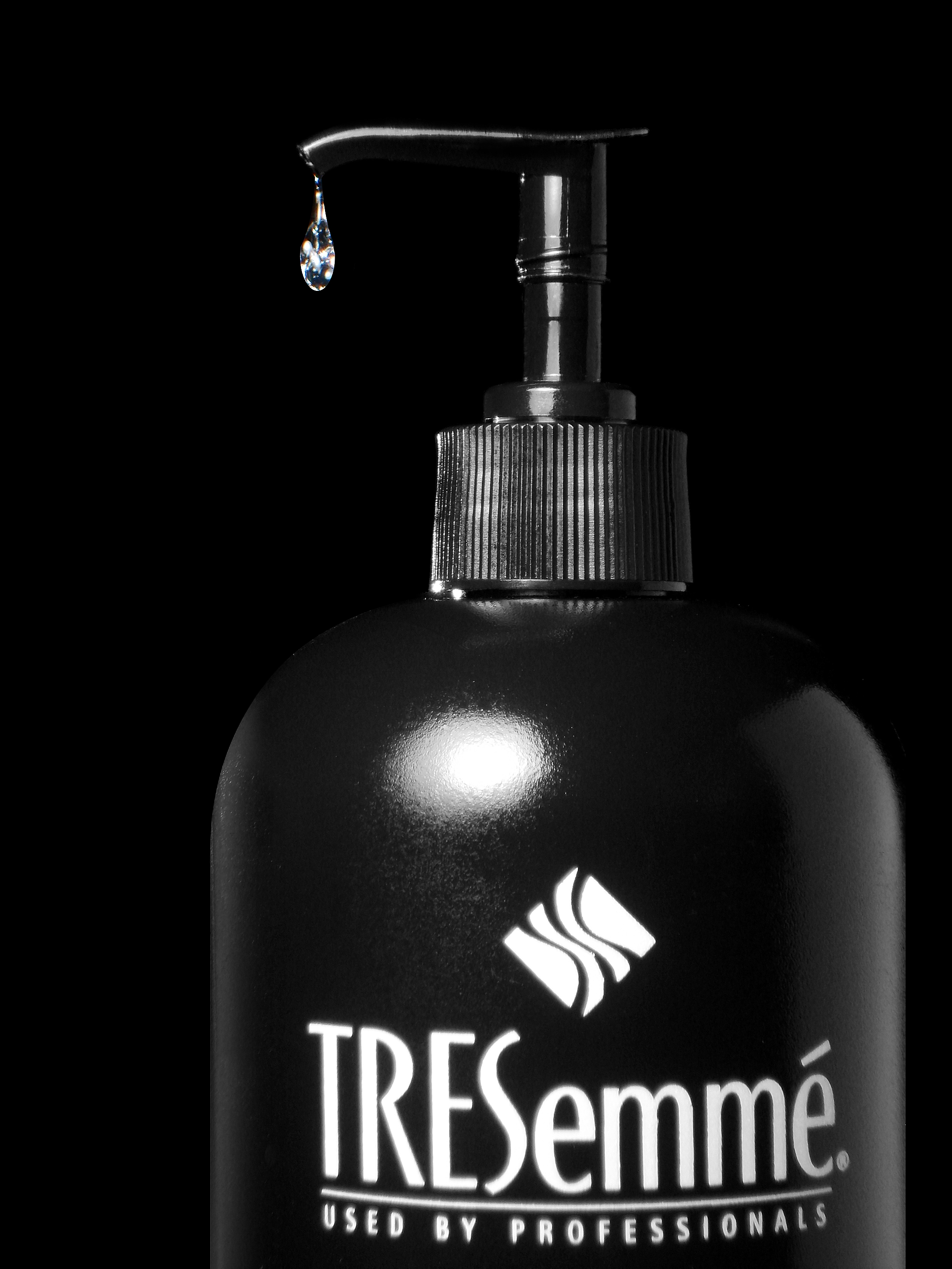
A bottle of TRESemmé shampoo

== History ==
The TRESemmé brand was launched in 1947 by Godefroy Manufacturing, and was bought in 1968 by Alberto-Culver, a manufacturer of hair and skincare products. The original intention was to only distribute the products of the brand within beauty salons; however, as the product line became more popular, it was marketed to supermarkets and pharmacies.

In 2010, Alberto-Culver was bought by Unilever, an Anglo–Dutch multinational consumer goods company. At that time, the product line was further developed and more products were added.

== Product range ==
TRESemmé creates formulas suited for different types of hair. TRESemmé products include: shampoos & conditioners, dry shampoos, mousse, gels, hair sprays, crème & milk, and other styling sprays. TRESemmé's products are used in hair salons across the United States, Canada, the United Kingdom and Asia, particularly for hair repair treatment from heat damage caused by hair ironing and blowdrying.

As of 2014, a software tool called "PROfiler" on the TRESemmé website allowed consumers to find the right products for their hair. As of 2018, the tool was no longer available.

== Advertisement ==
The brand spent an estimated US$17 million on advertising in 2004. As of 2006, advertisement campaigns included one promoted under "Professional, Affordable".

== South African racism controversy ==
In August 2020, TRESemmé was accused of being racist when its marketing campaign at South African retail chain Clicks ran an ad showing the text "dull and frizzy" and "dry and damaged" under the portrait of a black model while "fine and flat" and "normal" appeared under a white model. Following an uproar across South Africa against Clicks and TRESemmé, protest action, damage to some Clicks stores by members of the South African political party Economic Freedom Fighters (EFF), and a call by Minister of Small Business Development Khumbudzo Ntshavheni to remove all TRESemmé products, Clicks issued an apology, temporarily closed a number of its stores, suspended staff responsible for approving the advert, pulled all TRESemmé products, and pledged to fill the gap with locally sourced hair care brands.

National retail chains Shoprite/Checkers, Pick n Pay, Makro, Dis-Chem and Woolworths also announced their intention to remove all TRESemmé products from their shelves. On September 10, the EFF released a joint statement with Unilever South Africa on Twitter where they announced Unilever's decision to remove all its TRESemmé products from all retailers for 10 days as a show of remorse, conduct an internal investigation into the campaign, and take disciplinary action on those involved. The statement also said that the director involved in the campaign left the company and country.

The intent behind the damaging advertisement is not universally regarded as purposely malicious and neither Clicks nor TRESemmé consider its racial undertone to be intentional. TRESemmé issued an apology in September 2020, stating that "the campaign set out to celebrate the beauty of all hair types and the range of solutions that TRESemmé offers" and that "we got it wrong". Commenting on the controversy, black television personality Somizi Mhlongo said that there may be some truth in the TRESemmé ad, noting "The hair that they showed is the hair that looks like what happens when we relax our hair. My hair right now is not natural, it has chemicals, it’s damaged."

== Mercedes-Benz New York Fashion Week ==
TRESemmé was the official hair care sponsor of the Mercedes-Benz Fashion Week 2014 in New York in February, and had been since 2006.

TRESemmé created a team called "Runway Insiders" that included American model and DJ Harley Viera-Newton.

== Awards ==
Awards won by the TRESemmé brand include:

- Cosmopolitan Beauty Award 2010
- Allure Best of Beauty Award 2010
- Cosmopolitan Beauty Award 2011
- Elle Beauty Award 2011
- Allure Readers' Choice Breakthroughs 2011
