= Rod Rocket =

American animated television series

- Genre: Adventure
- Written by: Dick Robbins
- Directed by: Lou Scheimer; Hal Sutherland
- Starring: Sam Edwards; Hal Smith; Pat Blake
- Country of origin: United States
- Original language: English
- No. of episodes: 65

Production
- Executive producers: Mark Lipsky; Walter N. Bien
- Running time: 5 minutes
- Production companies: Filmation Associates; Sib Tower 12 Productions

Original release
- Release: 1963

Rod Rocket is an American animated television series that debuted in syndication in 1963, and was the first produced by Filmation. The show was produced in five-minute cliffhanger segments, with five segments making a full story. Television stations could broadcast the single-segment version daily on their local children's afternoon show, or package them together to make 26 weekly half-hour shows.

== History ==
Rod Rocket was originally produced by True Line, a small Los Angeles animation studio which subcontracted it to the newly formed Filmation Associates created by Lou Scheimer and Hal Sutherland in 1963. Scheimer and Sutherland had met while working at Larry Harmon Productions on the made-for-TV Bozo the Clown and Popeye cartoons. They produced the series for SIB Productions, a Japanese company.

== Plot ==
A boy named Rod Rocket and his best friend, Joey, are sent by wise codger Professor Argus on an exploratory mission in a spaceship called the Little Argo. He waits for them at home with his teenage granddaughter, Cassie. While in space, Rod and Joey constantly battle two bumbling cosmonauts.

== Voices ==
The voice cast included:

- Sam Edwards - Rod Rocket and Joey
- Hal Smith - Professor Angus
- Pat Blake - Cassie

== Episodes ==
- "Slave Labor in Space"
- "The Lava Trap"
- "Lost in a Lunar Mist"
- "Lights On"
- "The Acid Test"
