= Edna Gleason =

American pharmacist and fair trade activist

Edna Ewarda Gleason, née Capurra (Note: Sources disagree on the spelling of Gleason's birthname: Capurra or Capurro.) (February 20, 1886 – September 25, 1963), was an American pharmacist and fair trade activist. She was the first woman appointed to the California State Board of Pharmacy. As the president of the California Pharmaceutical Association and of the Independent Merchants of California, Gleason campaigned for fair trade principles and was instrumental in the passage of California's Fair Trade Act and Unfair Practices Act. She served on Stockton's city council for multiple terms.

== Early life and marriage ==
Edna was born on February 20, 1886, in Stockton, California, to John and Rose Capurra. She attended St. Agnes Academy.

On March, 27, 1910, Edna married Thomas F. Gleason, a pharmacist from San Francisco. While on their honeymoon in San Francisco, the couple and Thomas's sister were robbed at gunpoint in Thomas's father's home and left bound in ropes. The Gleasons were able to free themselves and contact the police after the criminals left by Edna biting through the ropes binding her sister-in-law's hands.

== Pharmaceuticals ==
Edna and Tom Gleason started their first drugstore in 1915. In early 1922, she passed the Pharmacy State Board examination. After Tom died in 1922, she continued to work their pharmacy, opening a second store four years later, and later a third store. In 1929, she joined the San Joaquin County Pharmacy Association.

In 1933, Governor James Rolph appointed Gleason to the State Board of Pharmacy. She was the first woman to serve on the board. Gleason was reappointed for a second four-year term in 1938 by Governor Frank Merriam.

Gleason served as president of the California Retail Druggists Association. Gleason also served as president of the Independent Merchants of California. In 1933, Gleason was awarded the Smith-Wilson Award by the National Association of Retail Druggists for "the most distinguished service to pharmacy in connection with fraternal relations".

== Fair trade ==
Pharmacies faced competition from retail chain stores and discount outlets, which sold a wide range of goods at lower prices, offsetting their lower profit margin by the high volume of sales. Discount outlets, then known as pineboards, would set up short term outlets in low-rent commercial space, hire unskilled workers at lower wages, and offer items at prices below cost. Gleason's first battle against a pineboard's predatory pricing began in 1927. Gleason organized a cooperatively-owned discount drugstore with Stockton's Independent Merchants' Association to compete with the newly-opened Kut-Price outlet. The coop, with the reputation of the association behind it, competed aggressively. Gleason bought out and liquidated the Kut-Price store by the end of the year.

Gleason was quoted in 1950 about the fight for fair trade:

In 1927 the year when we started this crusade in Stockton, American's businessmen were going out of business at the rate of 60,000 a year. Cut-rating by the chains was the cause. The big job was to convince the manufacturer that his strength lay in keeping the little independents alive. At first the manufacturers were afraid of offending the big accounts. But I convinced 'em.

In 1929, Gleason, with San Francisco pharmacist and lawyer W. Bruce Philip, began to focus on "reasonable price" provisions of California law. Gleason and Philip consolidated California's two regional pharmaceutical associations into the California Pharmaceutical Association (CPhA), and used its meetings and publications to establish voluntary "reasonable price" schedules. Manufacturers were pressured to enforce fair trade contracts. Association members policed each other for compliance. Gleason earned her nickname, "the dynamite from California", at the July 1930 CPhA meeting when she accused the president of Brunswig Drugs of misrepresentation and predatory practices. (Note: As president of the California Pharmaceutical Association, Gleason had a sign on her desk: "They Call Me Dynamite".)

Gleason and Philip surveyed druggists throughout the state to identify manufacturer and retail prices for trademarked items and compounded prescriptions and to gather complaints about unfair trade practices. The information obtained by the survey was used to lobby legislators, resulting in the 1931 Fair Trade Act. The law was soon challenged, with one case reaching the California Supreme Court in 1936, however the court upheld the law. Gleason later championed a companion Unfair Practices Act, passed in 1934, which prohibited false statements in advertising and selling below cost. (Note: Congress repealed fair trade laws in 1976.) She became known as "mother of fair-trade".

As the president of the CPhA, Gleason encouraged other states to enact fair trade laws. California's Fair Trade and Unfair Practices acts were copied by 44 other states.

== City council ==
Gleason was appointed to the city council in 1951. After the initial appointment, she was elected to the seat for three consecutive terms. Gleason, as a member of the city council, opposed efforts in the 1950s and 1960s to redevelop downtown Stockton, refusing to sanction the demolishment of existing neighborhoods.

== Death ==
Gleason died at home on September 25, 1963, after several years of serious heart troubles. City firemen and policemen acted as pallbearers and city flags were lowered to half-mast. Her former home became the Gleason House Medical Center for the poor and homeless, continuing the charitable work that she had engaged in while alive.

Gleason Park in Stockton was established in honor of Edna Gleason in 1975, dedicated to "Mrs. Dynamite, who championed the cause of the underdog throughout her lifetime with her energies and her wealth".
