= Sam Edwards =

American actor (1915–2004)

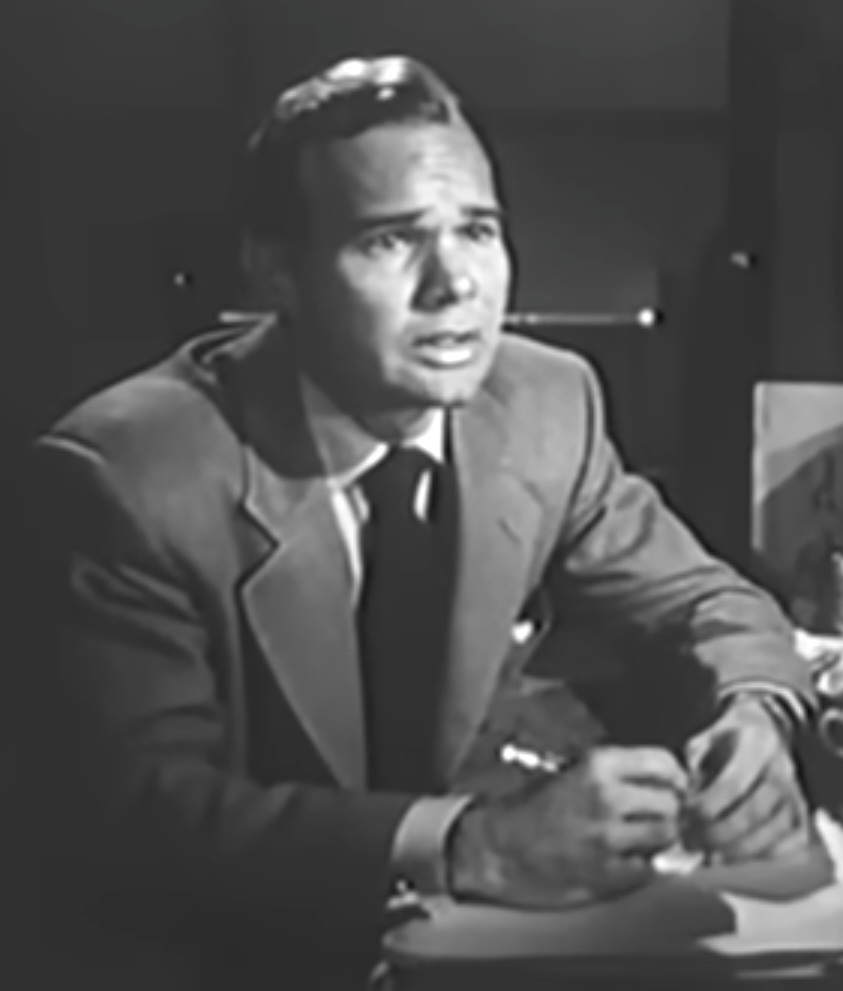
- Edwards in The Sun Sets at Dawn (1950)
- Born: May 26, 1915; Macon, Georgia, U.S.
- Died: July 28, 2004 (aged 89); Durango, Colorado, U.S.
- Occupation: Actor
- Years active: 1937–1983
- Spouse: Beverly Motley Edwards (m. 1969)
- Children: 3 step-children
- Parent: Edna Park Edwards (mother)

Sam George Edwards (May 26, 1915 – July 28, 2004) was an American actor. His most famous role on television was as banker Bill Anderson on Little House on the Prairie.

== Biography ==
=== Early years ===
Born into a show business family, his first role was as a baby in his mother's arms. He appeared on radio in the 1930s in the Adventures of Sonny and Buddy one of the first radio serials ever syndicated, and later in The Edwards Family, a series based on the life of Sam, brother Jack, who was also an actor, sister Florida, and his parents, Edna Park and Jack Edwards Sr. Sam was also an early cast member of one of the first radio soap operas, One Man's Family. Edwards graduated from Main Avenue High School in San Antonio.

== Career ==
=== Radio ===
Edwards worked on a variety of radio programs. He co-starred in the comedy The First Hundred Years on ABC in 1949 and landed a starring role playing Dexter Franklin opposite Janet Waldo in the long-running Meet Corliss Archer series. He also had recurring or cast member roles in radio on Crime Classics, Dr. Paul; Father Knows Best, Guiding Light, Fort Laramie; Gunsmoke; Dragnet; Suspense; Escape; This Is Your FBI; The Six Shooter; Yours Truly, Johnny Dollar, and Tales of the Texas Rangers.

=== Film ===
Edwards' first major screen role was as Chuck Ramsey in the movie serial version of Captain Midnight (1942). From 1949 to 1981, he made several film appearances, with significant roles in Twelve O'Clock High (1949), Operation Pacific (1951), Gangbusters (1954), and supporting roles in The Beatniks (1960) and Suppose They Gave A War and Nobody Came (1969). He was also seen in The Absent-Minded Professor (1961), Hello, Dolly! (1969) and The Postman Always Rings Twice (1981).

Edwards was also often heard behind animated characters both on film and records. In 1942, he voiced the adult Thumper in the animated classic Bambi. Later work for Disney was largely on LP Records, including the voices of the Cowardly Lion and Tin Woodman on their Oz series, and as Tigger, Owl, and the Heffalumps on the Winnie the Pooh records. He voiced the title character of Rod Rocket in an early 1960s educational series, and did some episodes of the cult classic Jonny Quest. His last work for Disney was as Ollie Owl opposite singer Burl Ives as Sam the Eagle on their long-running America Sings attraction at Disneyland. There were numerous TV and radio commercials as well, both in front of and behind the camera.

=== Television ===
Edwards appeared on many television series starting in the mid-1950s. Most notable of these include many episodes of Dragnet and Gunsmoke throughout their long runs. He also appeared on over 60 different series, including The George Burns and Gracie Allen Show, Straightaway, The Andy Griffith Show, Petticoat Junction, Green Acres, Mannix, Mission: Impossible, The Streets of San Francisco, Adam-12, The Red Skelton Show, Happy Days, The Dukes of Hazzard, and even Days of Our Lives. In 1969, Edwards appeared as Will Frazee on the TV series The Virginian in the episode titled "A Woman of Stone."

=== Death ===
On July 28, 2004, Edwards died of a heart attack at the age of 89 in Durango, Colorado.

== Selected filmography ==
- High Hat (1937) – Performer
- East Side Kids (1940) – Pete
- Captain Midnight (1942) – Chuck Ramsey
- Rubber Racketeers (1942) – Freddy Dale
- Bambi (1942) – Adult Thumper (voice)
- The Street with No Name (1948) – Whitey (uncredited)
- Larceny (1948) – YAA President (uncredited)
- The Countess of Monte Cristo (1948) – Bellhop (uncredited)
- Twelve O'Clock High (1949) – Lieutenant Birdwell
- The Sun Sets at Dawn (1950) – Herald Reporter
- The Jackpot (1950) – Parking Lot Attendant (uncredited)
- Flying Leathernecks (1951) – Junior (uncredited)
- Operation Pacific (1951) – Junior
- Witness to Murder (1954) – Tommy – Counterman (uncredited)
- The McConnell Story (1955) – Radio Man (uncredited)
- Between Heaven and Hell (1956) – Soames (uncredited)
- The Badlanders (1958) – Crazy Convict (uncredited)
- Torpedo Run (1958) – Coleman – Sub Radio Operator (uncredited)
- Revolt in the Big House (1958) – Al Carey
- The Beatniks (1960) – Red
- The Absent Minded Professor (1961) – Military Radio Dispatcher (uncredited)
- The Alfred Hitchcock Hour (1963) (Season 2 Episode 4: "You'll Be the Death of Me") - Bartender
- The Prize (1963) – Reporter (uncredited)
- Three Guns for Texas (1968) – Sammy (uncredited)
- The Young Runaways (1968) – Bert, Service Station Owner (uncredited)
- Bullitt (1968) – (voice)
- Dragnet 1966 (1969, TV Series) – Rodman (uncredited)
- Hello, Dolly! (1969) – Laborer (uncredited)
- The Cheyenne Social Club (1970) – Barfly Getting Up from Table (uncredited)
- Suppose They Gave a War and Nobody Came? (1970) – Deputy Sam
- Scandalous John (1971) – Bald Head
- The Deadly Dream (1971, TV Movie) – Man protesting his innocence (uncredited)
- In Broad Daylight (1971, TV Movie) – Cunningham
- The Death of Me Yet (1971, TV Movie) – Jerry
- The Biscuit Eater (1972) – Gun Club Member (uncredited)
- Set This Town on Fire (1973, TV Movie) – Motel Manager
- Chase (1973, TV Movie)
- Hog Wild (Walt Disney's Wonderful World of Color) (1974, TV Movie) – Farmer
- Hit Lady (1974, TV Movie) – Innkeeper
- Hurricane (1974, TV Movie) – Del Travis
- Requiem for a Nun (1975, TV Movie) – Governor
- Escape to Witch Mountain (1975) – Mate
- The Flight of the Grey Wolf (1976, TV Movie) – Amsel
- The New Daughters of Joshua Cabe (1976, TV Movie)
- Viva Knievel! (1977) – Stadium Manager (uncredited)
- Incredible Rocky Mountain Race (1977, TV Movie) – Milford Petrie
- Just Me and You (1978, TV Movie) (uncredited)
- Mark Twain: Beneath the Laughter (1979, TV Movie) – Bixby
- The Postman Always Rings Twice (1981) – Ticket Clerk
