= Hibel Museum of Art =

Coordinates: 26.8890°N 80.1167°W

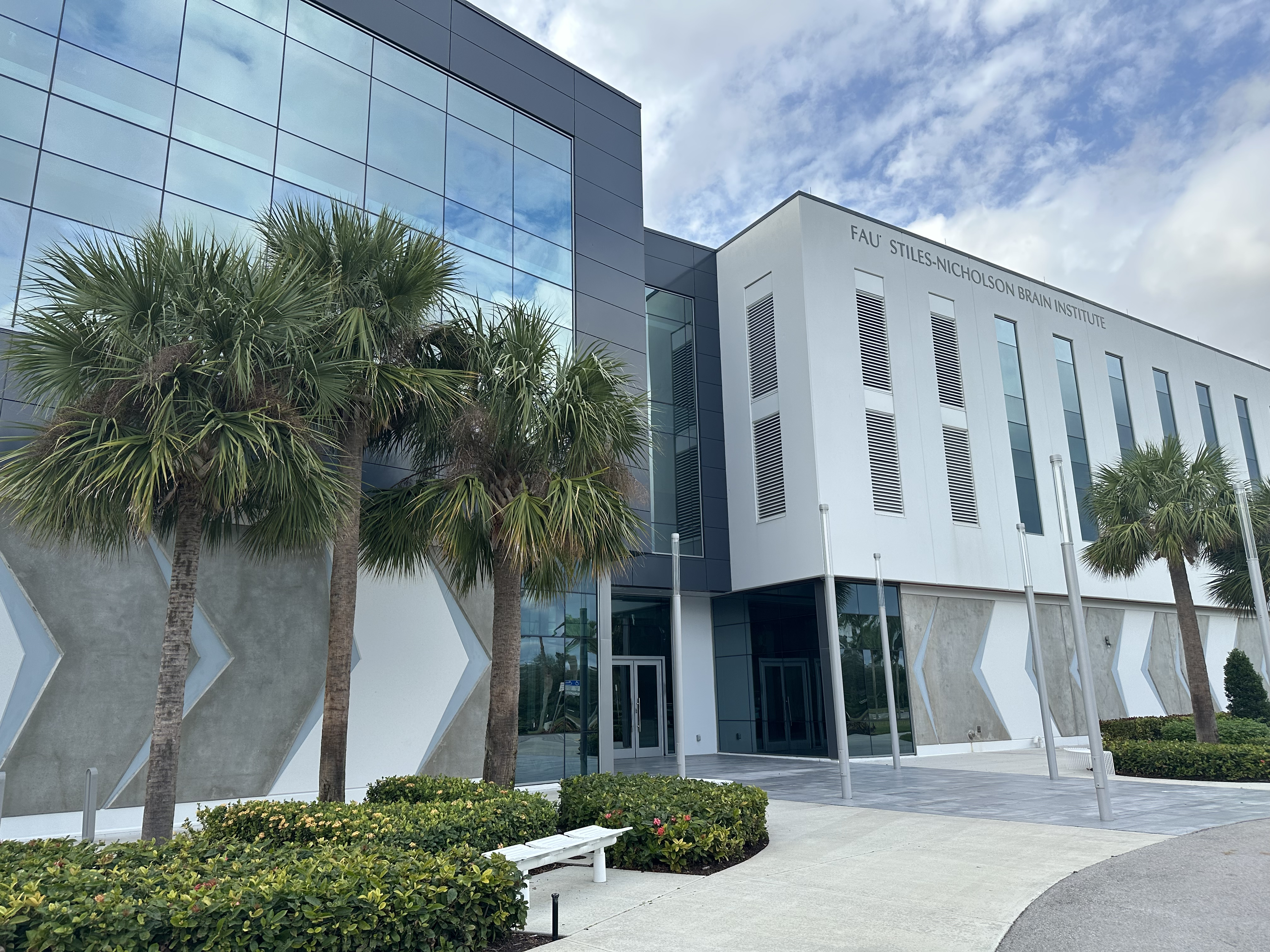
- Established: 1977
- Dissolved: 2015-2018
- Location: Florida Atlantic University, 5353 Parkside Dr, Jupiter Florida
- Type: Art Museum
- Website: http://www.hibel.org/

Hibel Museum of Art was an art museum on the campus of Florida Atlantic University in Jupiter, Florida dedicated to the paintings, lithographs, and other artwork of artist Edna Hibel. The museum hosted local and traveling exhibitions, public events and educational programs, and also was home to Edna Hibel's personal art library.

== History ==
The museum opened in 1977 in Palm Beach, Florida displaying the Ethelbelle and Clayton B. Craig collection works by Hibel. The Craigs had begun collecting works by the artist in 1961 when they met Hibel in her gallery in Rockport, Massachusetts. They founded the museum with the intention of retaining a significant cross section of Hibel's work in a single institution for the benefit of students, scholars and admirers. The collection grew with the donation of Asian snuff bottles from the Caldwell Family, and additional donations of Edna Hibel's work and other artworks, dolls, and sculptures. The museum was temporarily relocated to Lake Worth, Florida in 1999 and then in 2002 moved to its final location on the Florida Atlantic University campus. The museum was designed by Kha Le-Huu and Partners. Construction on the building began in 2001 with $900,000 from Hibel combined with some state matching funds.

== Dissolution ==
The museum initially closed in 2015 at the beginning of a dispute between the Edna Hibel Art Foundation and Florida Atlantic University. The written agreement to Edna Hibel described the $900,000 as a donation to the university and stipulated a forty-year, $1-per-year lease. In court documents, Hibel and her foundation claimed they thought they had invested in a permanent home. Museum employees became more uncertain after Hibel's death in 2014, and in July 2015 an employee handed their key over to the university without consulting the Hibel Art Foundation. The university saw this as abandoning the property and thus, citing also other violations, terminated the lease and evicted the foundation. The foundation claimed they had requested access to the museum but that Florida Atlantic University had not responded. In 2018, Judge August A. Bonavita ruled that Florida Atlantic University could keep some of the artworks and other contents of the museum to help compensate for $42,000 in legal fees.

The collection of the museum is being dispersed to other institutions, beginning with the transfer of ten works to the Wright Museum of Art at Beloit College.

== See also ==
- List of single-artist museums
