= Edna Merey-Apinda =

Gabonese writer (born 1976)

- Born: September 11, 1976 (age 49); Libreville
- Occupation: Writer

Edna Merey-Apinda (Libreville, September 11, 1976) is a Gabonese writer.

== Biography ==
Edna Merey-Apinda grew up in Port-Gentil with her six siblings, her mother was a midwife and her father was an administrative assistant. She took her baccalauréat in France, where she studied commerce in Toulouse.

She currently lives in Port-Gentil, where she works in an oil company.

== Works ==
- Les aventures d'Imya, petite fille du Gabon, Paris, L'Harmattan, 2004
- Ce soir je fermerai la porte, Paris, L'Harmattan, 2006
- Garde le sourire, Paris, Le Manuscrit, 2008
- Des contes pour la lune, St Maur, Jets d'Encre, 2010
- Ce reflet dans le miroir St Maur, Jets d'Encre, 2011

in October 2011, one of her short story was translated in German for an Austrian magazine, under the title "Es regnet auf die Stadt".
