= Leif Arne Brekke =

Norwegian football defender (born 1977)

Personal information
- Date of birth: 12 March 1977 (age 49)
- Height: 1.80 m (5 ft 11 in)
- Position: Full back

Team information
- Current team: Modum FK

Senior career*
| Years | Team | Apps | (Gls) |
| –1995 | IL Nordlys | | |
| 1995–1997 | Alta IF | | |
| 1998–2000 | Tromsø IL | 19 | (0) |
| 2001– | IF Skarp | | |
- FK Jerv
| –2006 | Drøbak/Frogn IF | | |
| 2007 | Åmot IF | | |
| 2008– | Modum FK | | |

International career
| 2006 | Sápmi | 3 | (1) |
- * Club domestic league appearances and goals

Leif Arne Brekke (born 12 March 1977) is a Norwegian football defender who most recently played for Modum FK.

He has played in the Norwegian Premier League for Tromsø IL. After joining IF Skarp in 2001, he played 200 matches in a row in the Second Division (third tier).

He grew up in Karasjok, and is the brother of fellow footballer Jan Egil Brekke. He has played for the Sápmi national football team.
