= Edna Park Edwards =

American screen actress

- Born: 1895; Pittsburgh, Pennsylvania
- Died: 1967 (aged 71–72); Hollywood, Los Angeles
- Occupation: Screen actress
- Spouse: Jack Edwards
- Children: 3, including Sam Edwards

Edna Park Edwards (c. 1895–June 5, 1967) was an American screen actress.

== Life ==
Edna Park was born in Pittsburgh, Pennsylvania. She was a vaudeville dancer as a child, performing alongside her mother. In her teens she performed with several dramatic stock companies. She married Jack Edwards, another actor. They formed their own company, the Edna Park Players, playing in the American South, in New York, and in San Francisco.

She became a leading lady for Tom Mix. After retiring from the screen she wrote for radio. She died in Hollywood, Los Angeles on June 5, 1967. She was survived by a daughter and two sons, including the actor Sam Edwards.
