= Edna Lois Foley =

American nurse (1878 – 1943)

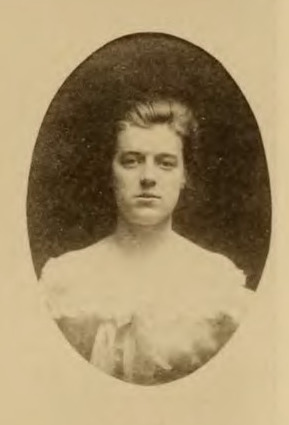
Edna Lois Foley

Edna Lois Foley (December 17, 1878 – August 4, 1943) was an American nurse. She served as a chief nurse of the American Red Cross Tuberculosis Commission for Italy in 1919. In 1914, she prepared the Visiting Nurse Manual. She advocated the need for more opportunities for African-American nurses.

== Biography ==
Edna Lois Foley was born on December 17, 1878, in Hartford, Connecticut to William R. and Matilda (Baker) Foley. She graduated from Smith College. She also studied at the Hartford Hospital Training School for Nurses. In 1912, she became the superintendent of the Visiting Nurse Association (VNA), Chicago.

She was one of the founders of the National Organization for Public Health Nursing, which was established in 1912. The other founders include Lilian Wald, Ella Crandall, and Mary Beard. She served as the director of Chicago Tuberculosis Institute. In 1916, she also became the director of the National Society for Study and Prevention of Tuberculosis. Between 1920 and 1921, she served as one of the presidents of National Organization for Public Health Nursing.

She emphasized the need for nurses to take teaching, and administrative responsibilities such as supervision and inspection.

She died on August 4, 1943, in New York City.
