= Edna Shemesh =

Israeli novelist

- עדנה שמש
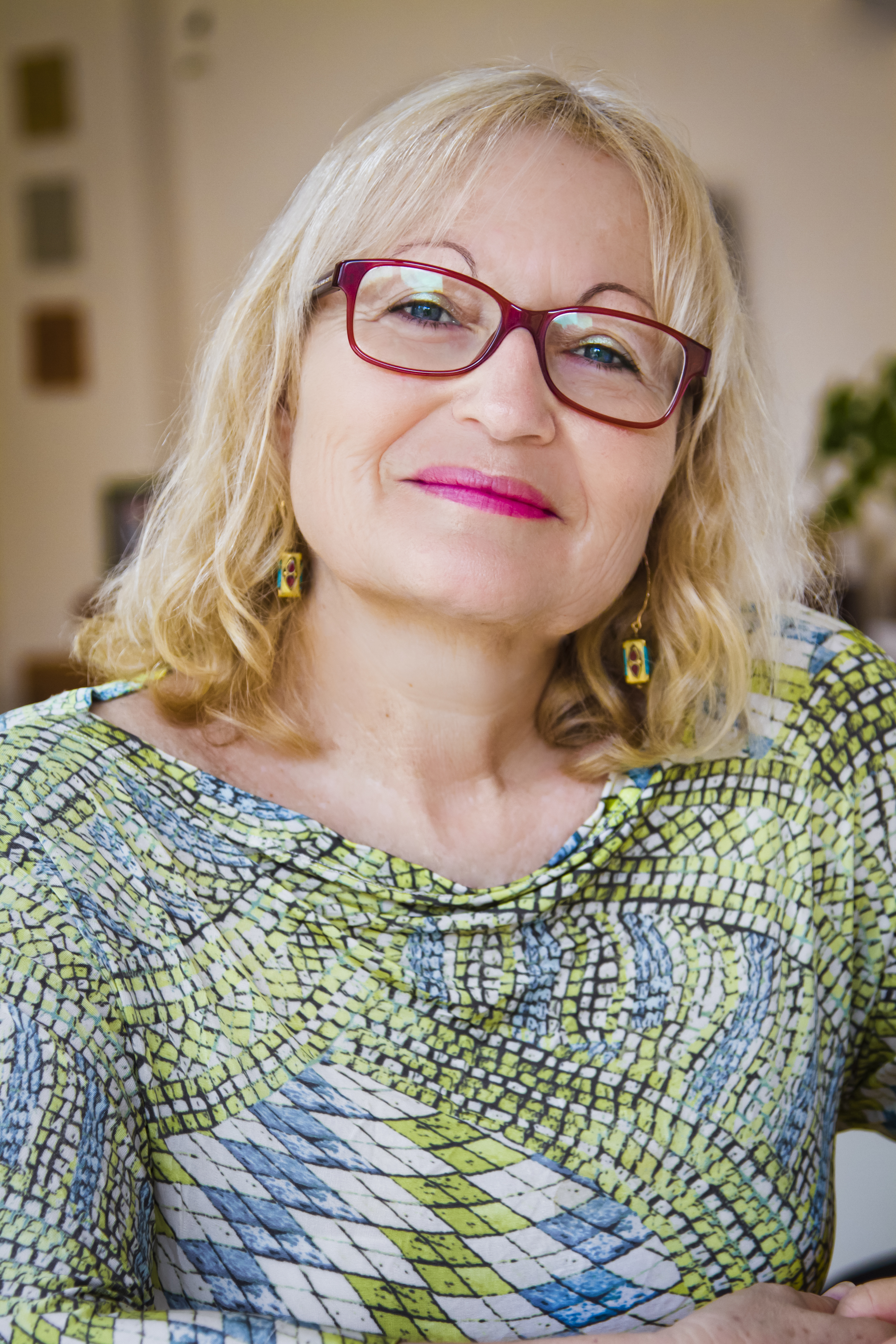
- Edna Shemesh, 2012
- Born: May 19, 1953 (age 73); Cluj-Napoca, Romania
- Occupation: Author
- Writing career
- Notable works: Amstel (2007), The Sand Dunes of Paris (2013), Hotel Malta (2015), Go, Pave the Sea (2018)

Edna Shemesh (Hebrew: עדנה שמש; née Erika Lev; born May 19, 1953) is an Israeli novelist, short story writer, translator, book reviewer, former journalist and independent editor.

== Biography ==
Born in 1953 in Cluj, Romania, she immigrated to Israel with her family at the age of four. She studied at the Hebrew University in Jerusalem, where she earned her B.A. in English Literature and The History of Theatre, as well as a diploma for English teaching. She is a certified radio speaker by the Israeli Broadcasting Authority and a graduate of the Translation and Translation Editing program at Tel Aviv University.

Her fiction and poetry have been published in Keshet HaHadasha, Noga, Jewish Fiction .net, Ahshav, Moznayim, Iton 77, Masmerim, Petel, The Short Story Project, Jewish Literary Journal, nrg, Ynet, and in various other publications, including anthologies such as Le Miroir (France) and Beit HaDyo (Israel). She Writes regularly for the children's magazine Eynaim. Her book reviews have been published in Haaretz daily and Iton 77 magazine.

||Shemesh wrote magazine articles for Bamakom of Yediot daily and Arim of Shoken daily, and as an independent journalist she published in The Jerusalem Post, The Jerusalem Report, nrg, Masa Acher, Masa Tsair and Ynet. She has been invited to give talks about her writing at Harvard University (2015), the National Library of New Zealand and The Shoa Center at Wellington (2016), at SIS University at Shanghai, China (2016) and the TOLI International Teachers Conference at Lisbon, Portugal (2018). She was awarded the MacDowell Fellowship in 2017.

== Personal life ==
Shemesh is married to Aldo Shemesh, professor at the Weizmann Institute of Science, and has three children (Noam, Yael, Omer). She lives in Rehovot, Israel

== Publications ==
=== Novels and short fiction ===
- Amstel (2007)
- The Sand Dunes of Paris (2013)
- Hotel Malta (2015)
- Go, Pave the Sea (2018)

=== Translation into Hebrew ===
- Barack Obama, Dreams from My Father
- John Berendt, The City of Falling Angels
- Tracy Chevalier, Burning Bright
- George Hagen, The Laments

== Awards, grants and fellowships ==
- 2002 – First prize in the radical feminist Noga magazine short story competition, for “Arabesque”
- 2002 – Women Writers of the Mediterranean Award (Marseilles, France), for “Arabesque” in its French translation
- 2004 – First Prize in the Iton 77 magazine anonymous short story competition, for “Into the Water”
- 2014 – Am HaSeffer translation grant by The Israeli Ministry of Culture, for the English translation of The Sand Dunes of Paris
- 2016 – Am HaSeffer translation grant by The Israeli Ministry of Culture, for the English translation of Hotel Malta
- 2016 – The Shanghai Writers Program (China)
- 2017 – The MacDowell Fellowship (USA)
