= Edana of Ireland =

Irish monastic

Saint Edana of Ireland
- Born: 6th century Ireland
- Died: 516; Ireland
- Venerated in: Roman Catholic Church
- Feast: July 5th

Edana of Ireland (also Edaene, Etaoin, Edna, Eidyn) was an Irish monastic who lived at the confluence of the River Shannon and Boyle River during the sixth century.

Her name means "little fire" or "little flame". Saint Patrick ordained Edana as a monastic. She is the patroness saint of several parishes in western Ireland including Tuam and Elphin. A "famous holy well", known for its healing properties, was named for her. Her feast day is July 5.

Some sources state that the city of Edinburgh, close to the site where she founded a convent, was named for her. She is sometimes confused with St. Modwenna of Whitby, although there is no evidence supporting it.
