= Edna Malone =

Canadian dancer

Edna Margaret Malone (February 1, 1899 - 1979) was a Canadian dancer. Her married names included Edna Siegrest, Edna Spangler; her stage name was Peggy Malone.

Malone was born in Nelson, British Columbia. She began her dance training with Gladys Attree in Nelson, and was invited to study at the Ruth St. Denis and Ted Shawn School in Los Angeles, California in 1917. She danced with St. Denis, Doris Humphrey and Betty Horst on a tour that crossed Canada.

In 1920 Malone worked as a dancer as part of the dinner vaudeville show at the Rose Room in San Francisco's Palace Hotel, where she was reviewed "Miss Edna Malone, the famous soloist danseuse is probably the highest developed type of an interpretative dancer appearing before the public today."

Works in her repertoire included The Inspiration of Wedgwood, The Moon of Love, A Chopin Fantasy and the Egyptian Palace Dance.
