= Edna Dee Woolford Saunders =

Music producer and civic leader

Edna Dee Woolford Saunders (August 31, 1880–December 21, 1963) was a music producer and civic leader in Houston.

== Early life ==
Saunders was born on August 31, 1880, the daughter of John Dunnock Woolford, the mayor of Houston from 1900 to 1902. Her mother was Ianthe Dealy Woolford. Saunders graduated from Houston High School, and attended the Stuart School in Washington, D.C. She studied music at the Gardner School in New York.

== Career ==
Saunders started organizing music events in Houston as early as 1901 as a member of the Woman's Choral Club. After her appointment as president of the club in 1913, she produced a guest performance of the Boston Opera Company and Anna Pavlova. In 1918 she booked performances at the Houston City Auditorium. In the 1920s, her production company scheduled orchestras from Cincinnati, Minneapolis, New York, and St. Louis, and individual performers such as Enrico Caruso, Sergei Rachmaninoff, and Marian Anderson. She brought in a diverse variety of international dance groups to perform in Houston during the 1930s.

== Death and legacy ==
Saunders died on December 21, 1963, in Houston. Her pallbearers included the president of the Houston Chronicle and two former mayors.

The Houston Endowment was a major contributor to an addition to Jones Hall in downtown Houston. In recognition of Saunders' contribution to music productions in Houston, Jones Hall, the main venue for performances of classical music, added the Green Room in her honor.
