= Edna Hibel =

American artist (1917–2014)

- Hibel in 2004
- Born: January 13, 1917; Brookline, Massachusetts, U.S.
- Died: December 5, 2014 (aged 97); Palm Beach Gardens, Florida, U.S.
- Occupation: Painter
- Spouse: Theodore Plotkin (m. 1940; died 2012)
- Children: 3

Edna Hibel Plotkin (January 13, 1917 – December 5, 2014) was an American artist. She painted for most of her life. Her work was once held at the Hibel Museum of Art; some of it now resides at Beloit College in Wisconsin.

== Early life and education ==
Edna Hibel was born on January 13, 1917, in Brookline, Massachusetts. Her parents were Jewish immigrants from Poland. She began to study watercolors when she was nine years old. According to her son, Hibel began painting after she finished her math schoolwork early. Hibel graduated from Brookline High School and enrolled at the Boston Museum School of Fine Arts, which she graduated from in 1939. She also studied in Mexico on a fellowship.

== Career ==
In 1988, an article by Tampa Bay Magazine reported that Hibel had painted Abraham Maslow-inspired work for over 50 years. She started working on lithographs in 1966. Hibel painted portraits of men and women expressing emotions or contemplating on ceramic, canvas, and Bavarian limestone. The limestones were 3 to 6 inches thick, polished, and grained. Hibel painted on the limestones with wax pencils, crayons, or inks made from grease. The final result was pressed onto paper as a lithograph that was signed by Hibel and then numbered. She also created porcelain lithography. In 1995, the National Archives Foundation commissioned Hibel to paint a piece that commemorated the 75th anniversary of women's suffrage in the United States. Hibel was the first female artist to paint in 10 different decades.

Author W. David Marx, in his 2022 book Status and Culture, lamented that "at the moment of this writing, there is no Wikipedia page for Edna Hibel, nor does her name appear in standard volumes on art history." Marx argued that Hibel was categorized as a "creator", not an "artist", because of a lack of institutional acceptance from the art world.

== Personal life ==
Hibel was married to Theodore Plotkin, who died in 2012. Together they had three children and seven grandchildren.

=== Death ===
Hibel died on December 5, 2014, at age 97 in Palm Beach Gardens, Florida. Hibel's art was held at the Hibel Museum of Art on the campus of Florida Atlantic University in Jupiter, Florida, until 2018, due to lease disagreements after Hibel's death. Some of her works were transferred to the Wright Museum of Art at Beloit College in Wisconsin.
