= Edna L. Emme =

American hairdresser and cosmetologist (1899–1995)

- Born: 14 April 1899
- Died: 22 August 1995 (aged 96)
- Occupation: Cosmetologist

Edna L. Emme (April 14, 1899 – August 22, 1995) was a cosmetologist. She founded the National Hairdressers and Cosmetologists Association, now known as the National Cosmetology Association. Emme served five times as the president of the association, and in 1938 visited the White House. The NHCA at that time represented the industry, even though the organization was all-white and thus all African-American beauty show owners and operators were excluded.

== Legacy ==
The brand name TRESemmé of the haircare products manufactured by the Godefroy Manufacturing Company, is a wordplay on the French for "well-loved" (French: très-aimé) and a reference to Edna L. Emme.
