= Edna Haviland =

Canadian chemist

- Born: March 1896; Toronto
- Died: April 1981 (aged 84–85); Waterloo, Ontario
- Education: McMaster University
- Occupation: Industrial chemist
- Employer: Dominion Rubber Company

Edna Marie Haviland (March 1896 - April 27, 1981) was a Canadian industrial chemist who spent her career researching rubber properties for the Dominion Rubber Company.

== Biography ==
Haviland was born in Toronto in March 1896. Her father was a Baptist minister and the family moved frequently. After graduating from Riverdale Collegiate she pursued a science degree at McMaster University, graduating with honours in 1918. At the time she was the only student left in the program as her male colleagues had left to serve in World War I. While at McMaster Haviland was vice-president of both her class and the Literary Society.

Recruited by Dominion Rubber Company in 1918, Haviland began her career with the company as a lab assistant in Montreal. The following year she relocated to Kitchener, Ontario where she advanced to Technical Assistant of the lab, becoming the first woman in the industry to obtain the type of position.

Haviland worked with rubber compounds and synthetic materials identifying the best formula or 'recipes' for rubber tires. Her work was particularly important during World War II when a shortage of natural rubber supplies hindered regular production schedules and processes requiring new approaches to tire production in order to support troops overseas. By 1955 Haviland was working with roughly 1,000 different types of rubber compounds suitable for different situations and conditions. She retired from the company 1960.

Haviland died at Sunnyside Home in Waterloo, Ontario on April 27, 1981. Following her death the Kitchener-Waterloo branch of the Canadian Federation of University Women established the Edna Haviland Science Award in her honour. The award is given to a graduating secondary female student in the Region of Waterloo with high standing in chemistry to encourage the pursuit of a career in the sciences. Haviland, along with ten other women, helped found the branch in 1922. She served as President during the 1926-1927 and 1934-1935 terms and was the first member to be awarded a lifetime membership.
