= Edna Andrews =

American linguist

Edna Andrews is an American linguist. She is the Nancy & Jeffrey Marcus Distinguished Professor of Slavic & Eurasian Studies at Duke University and holds an honorary doctorate by Saint Petersburg State University. Her current concerns are second language education.

== Early life and education ==
Andrews received a doctorate degree from Indiana University Bloomington.

== Books ==
- Conversations with Lotman: Cultural Semiotics in Language, Literature, and Cognition (2003).
