= Aunt Susan =

American journalist and radio personality

- Born: Edna Vance; March 24, 1893; Missouri, U.S.
- Died: September 27, 1972 (aged 79); Evergreen, Colorado, U.S.
- Known for: "Aunt Susan" column and radio show
- Spouse(s): Martin Adams (m. 1920–1933) Harold L. Mueller (m. 1943)

Aunt Susan (born Edna Vance; March 24, 1893 – September 27, 1972) was an American journalist and radio personality active in Oklahoma from the early to mid 20th century. She was raised in Oklahoma City and ran the "Aunt Susan" column for the Daily Oklahoman from 1928 to 1943. After leaving the Oklahoman, she worked for McCall's. She also published a cookbook in 1951: Aunt Susan's How-to-Cook Book.

== Early life and education ==
Edna Vance was born on March 24, 1893, to Asa Jasper Vance and Annie Russell in Missouri. Her family moved to Oklahoma City after 1900 and her father ran a small vegetable farm. She attended Oklahoma A&M College, but left before graduation to accept a teaching position in Yale, Oklahoma. She married Martin Adams in 1920.

== Career as Aunt Susan ==
Vance started working at the Daily Oklahoman after the retirement of Susan Abercrombie in 1928 and took over her "Aunt Susan" cooking column. From 1928 to 1942, she wrote under the name Aunt Susan for one of Oklahoma's largest newspapers. Her recipe for "Aunt Bill's Brown Candy" became a holiday favorite in the state reprinted for at least 15 years. In the 1930s she hosted a five-day-a-week show on WKY. In 1933, her husband died. She later moved to New York and was the food editor for McCall's. In 1943, she married Harold L. Mueller, an associate editor for the Daily Oklahoman and Oklahoma City Times. In 1947, she worked for General Mills editing precursors to what would become the Betty Crocker Cookbook. In 1951 she published her own cookbook: Aunt Susan's How-to-Cook Book.

== Later life and death ==
She retired in the 1960s and moved to Colorado to be closer to family. She died on September 27, 1972, in Evergreen, Colorado. She was a member of the Christian Science Church.
