= Edna Zyl Modie =

American painter (1886–1981)

Edna Zyl Modie (April 14, 1886 – November 14, 1981) was an American painter and founding member of the Pomona Valley Art Association.

== Early life ==
Modie was born in Willow Creek, a very small community in San Benito County, California (there's another Willow Creek, California near the California/Oregon border). her parents are Charles C. and Lillian Janette Modie. All 4 of her grandparents moved to California between 1848 - 1849, where here parents were born (Napa, California for Charles and Watsonville, California for Lillian).

Her family moved from Walnut Creek in 1887 to various places in Southern California, including Pomona, California, before settling in Los Angeles around 1891.

== Education ==
Modie graduated from Los Angeles High School in 1904, and from Los Angeles School of Art and Design in 1907. She also taught at the California School of Artistic Whistling in Los Angeles, California. Modie previously studied under Agnes Woodward, the founder of the school. Modie performed and helped other performed at venues. In the 1910's Modie switched her focus to her painting.
