= Brunswig Drug Company Building =

Historic building in San Diego, California, U.S.

Brunswig Drug Company
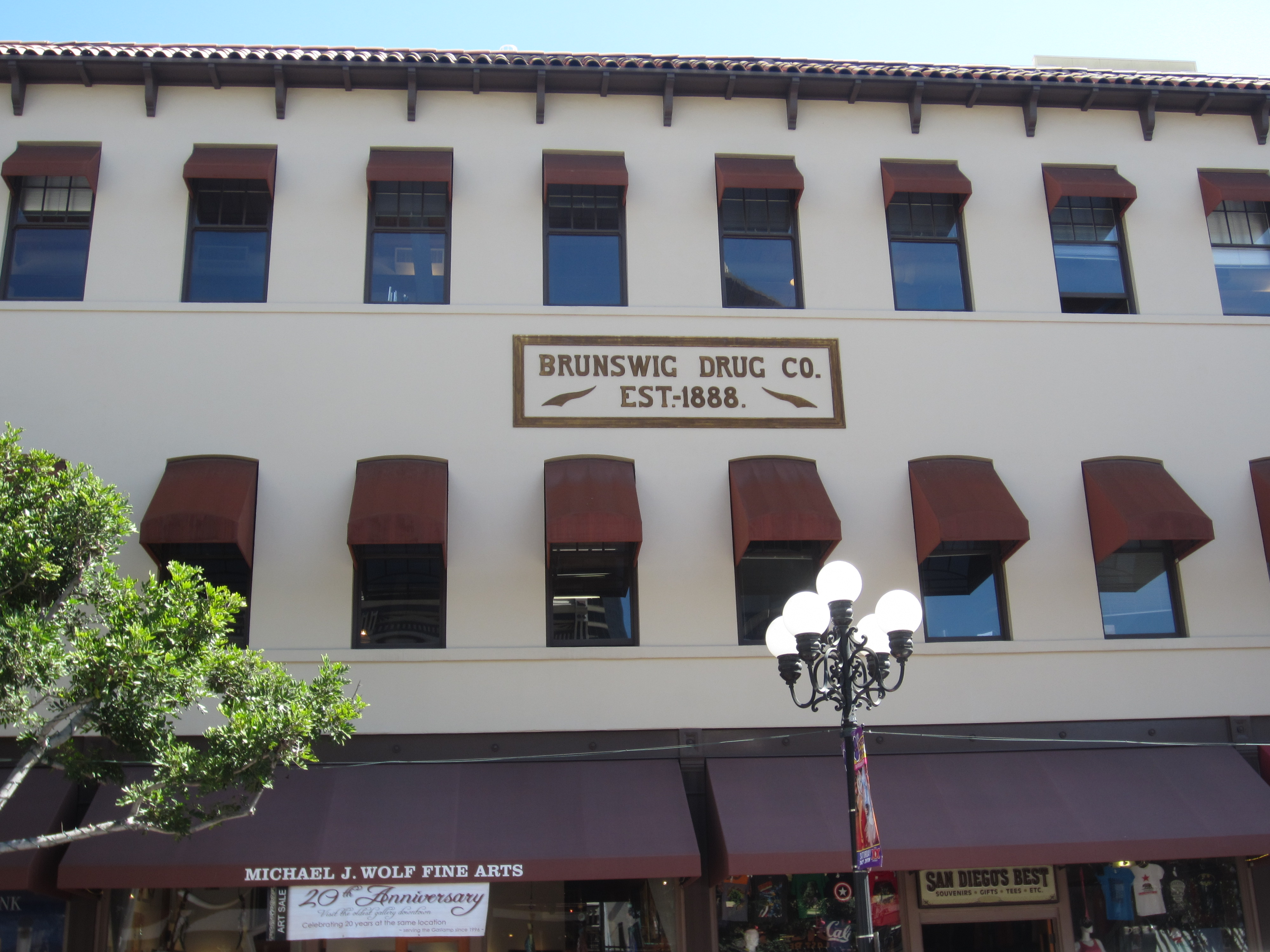
- The building's exterior in 2016
- Interactive map of the Brunswig Drug Company area

General information
- Location: 383 5th Avenue, San Diego, California, United States
- Coordinates: 32.709196°N 117.159971°W
- Completed: 1900

Technical details
- Floor count: 3 (originally 2)

Brunswig Drug Company Building is an historic structure located at 383 5th Avenue in San Diego's Gaslamp Quarter, in the U.S. state of California.

The two-story building was built in 1900 on land purchased for $10,500 in gold. It survived a fire in 1915. A third story was added to the building in 1925, giving it its present form.

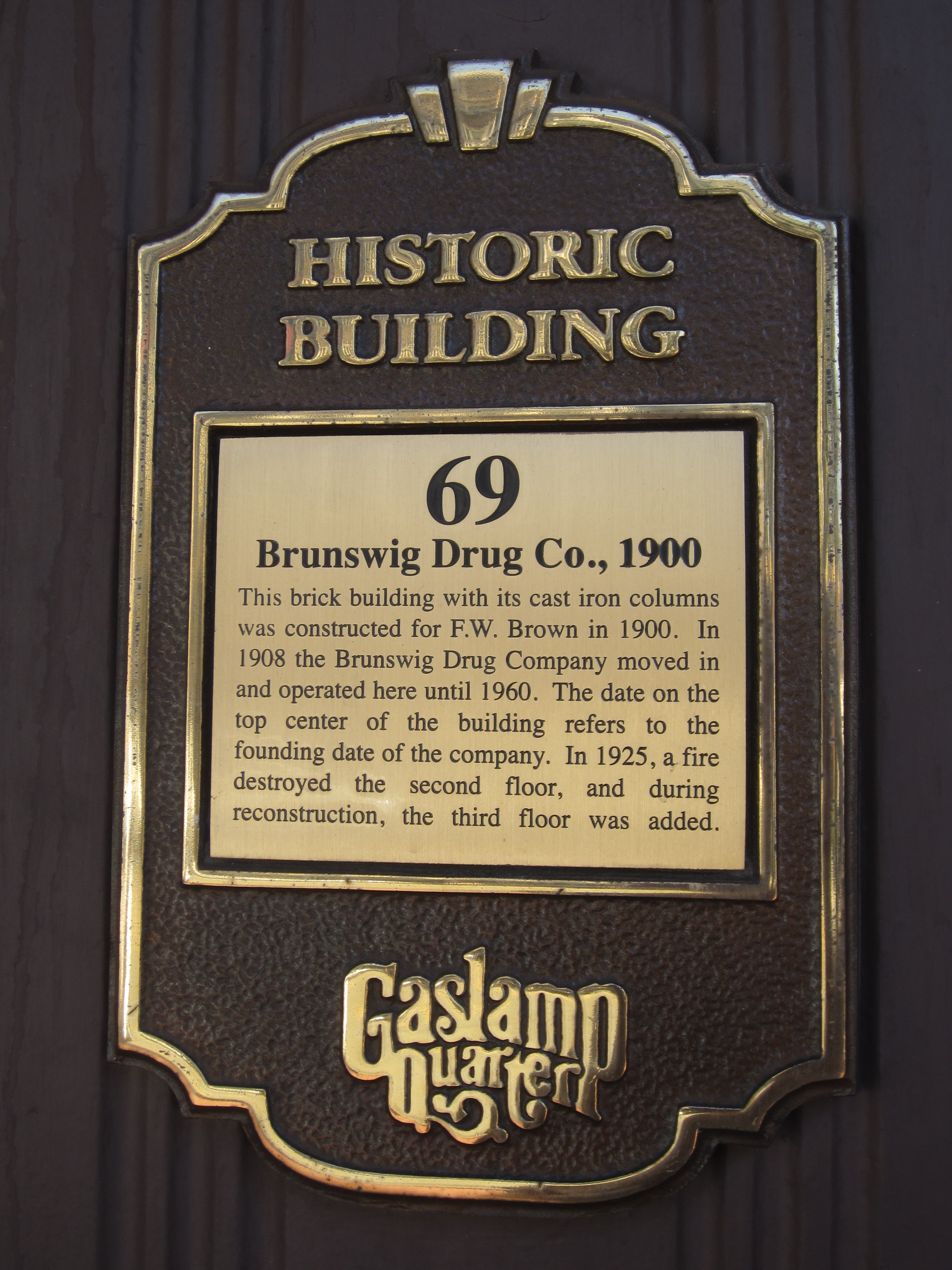
Plaque for the building, 2016

== See also ==
- List of Gaslamp Quarter historic buildings
