= Edna Lee Booker =

American journalist

- Born: October 4, 1897; Danville, Virginia, U.S.
- Died: October 27, 1994 (aged 97); Bethesda, Maryland, U.S.
- Occupation: journalist
- Notable work: News Is My Job: A Correspondent in War-Torn China; Flight from China
- Spouse: John Potter (m. 1923; died 1970)
- Children: Patricia Luce Chapman

Edna Lee Booker Potter (October 4, 1897 – October 27, 1994) was an American journalist who authored several books about China during the 1930s and 1940s.

== Biography ==
Born in Danville, Virginia, she later moved to California, where she worked at the Los Angeles Herald and the San Francisco Call-Bulletin.

She arrived in Shanghai in 1919 as foreign correspondent for the International News Service of New York City and as, in her own words, a "girl reporter" for the China Press, then the leading American daily in China. She became the first foreign woman correspondent to interview Chinese warlords Zhang Zuolin and Wu Peifu.

In 1923, Booker married businessman John Stauffer Potter in Shanghai, where he was director of the Bank of China after the Second World War. They were living in Shanghai in 1937, when Imperial Japan invaded and occupied China. Just days before the relocation of citizens to Japanese internment camps, Booker Potter and her children fled to the United States. However, her husband was interned for years.

She and her husband had a son, John Jr., and a daughter, Patricia. In 1947, her daughter married the son of newspaper magnate Henry Luce. She later wrote a memoir of the family's China years entitled Tea On The Great Wall, published in 2014.

== Works ==
- News Is My Job - A Correspondent in War-Torn China. 1940. New York, The Macmillan Company.
- Flight from China. with John S. Potter. Decorations by Peggy Bacon. 1945. New York, The Macmillan Company.

== See also ==
- Agnes Smedley
- Anna Louise Strong
