= Edna Blanchard Lewis =

American insurance broker

Edna Blanchard Lewis (c. 1876 − December 25, 1933) was an insurance broker.

She was born in Dutchess County, New York; her year of birth is given in a 1910 article as about 1876, and in her obituary as about 1882. She graduated from Detroit Normal School and became a teacher, and taught for ten years in New York, both at public schools and at the Institute for the Blind. She then became an insurance agent. Most of her business came from the women's colleges of Vassar, Wellesley, Smith and Mount Holyoke. After working as an agent for some time, she became an independent broker, and set up an office in New York's financial district, on Pine Street. In 1906, in the wake of the insurance scandal of that year, she expanded this into a company, the Women's Insurance Department, employing only women, and by 1910 she had licenses to operate in New York, New Jersey and Massachusetts. In 1910 she contributed an article about how to enter the insurance field to a book on vocational opportunities for women. That year she was described as managing "the only insurance department in the world run exclusively for women".

She was a strong believer in women's suffrage. She died in 1933 at her home in Manhattan on December 25, 1933.
