= Ednah Robinson Aiken =

American author, playwright, novelist

Ednah Robinson Alken
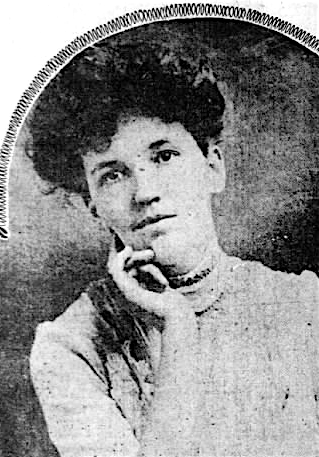
- Ednah Robinson Aiken, in portrait from a 1905 newspaper article about her wedding
- Born: September 7, 1878; San Francisco, California
- Died: 1960
- Occupations: writer and clubwoman
- Notable work: The River (1914); The Hate Breeders (1916)

Ednah Robinson Aiken (September 7, 1872 – 1960) was an American writer, editor, clubwoman, and playwright, based in the San Francisco Bay area.

== Early life and education ==
Ednah P. Robinson was born in San Francisco, California. Her parents were Cornelius Preston Robinson, a lawyer, and Ida Jarboe Robinson. Her grandfather Tod Robinson Jr. arrived in California in 1850, and soon after became a judge. Her great uncle was Cornelius Robinson, an Alabama politician.

Aiken attended the University of California at Berkeley, where she held a Phoebe Hearst scholarship as a member of the Class of 1898.

== Career ==
Alken's first novel, The River (1914), about California's Imperial Valley, is often cited as an example of California regional literature, and as an "irrigation novel" by Kevin Starr. Other novels by Aiken include The Hinges of Custom (1923); If Today Be Sweet (1923), about Prohibition; Love and I (1928); and Snow (1930), set in Alaska. Her one-act play about World War I, The Hate Breeders (1916), was published with an introduction by Belgian pacifist Henri la Fontaine. Her short stories and non-fiction articles also appeared in Harper's Magazine, Out West, Cosmopolitan Magazine and others.

Ednah Aiken was on the staff at Sunset Magazine, and edited for the Western Journal of Education. She also worked with the Bureau of Naturalization of the Department of Labor, and was state chair for americanization for the California Congress of Mothers, work she related to women's suffrage: "Women must understand citizenship also, for they now have the right to vote, and if ignorant will become a menace. Give them a modern and vital course in citizenship. Make them feel we need them to help us reach our common goal."

In 1904, Ednah Robinson was a founding member of the Sequoia Club of San Francisco. She was an officer of the San Francisco Federation of Women's Clubs for the 1918–1920 term, and a member of the Education committee. In 1927 she led a short story group for the Santa Clara County League of American Pen Women, and by 1929 she was elected president of the league.

== Personal life ==
Ednah Robinson married Sunset Magazine's first editor, Charles Sedgwick Aiken, in 1905. They had a son, Douglas Sedgwick Aiken, born in 1906. She was widowed when Charles died in 1911. She lived at "Lavender Farm" in Los Altos, and later in Palo Alto, where she mentored Stanford University students. She died in 1960, aged 88 years. Her papers are archived at the Bancroft Library.
