= Jan Egil Brekke =

Norwegian football midfielder (born 1974)

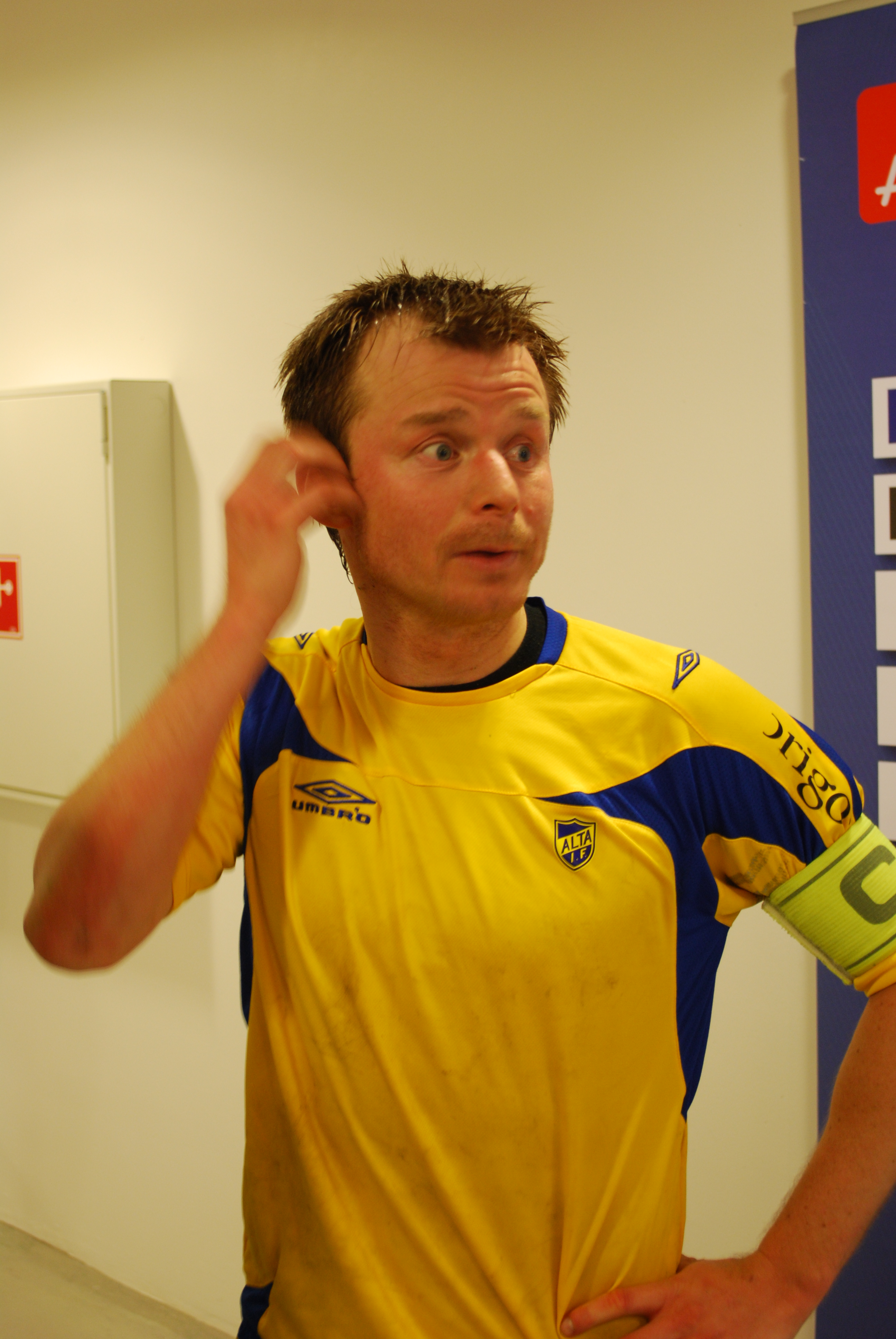

Personal information
- Date of birth: 14 June 1974 (age 52)
- Height: 1.75 m (5 ft 9 in)
- Position: Midfielder

Team information
- Current team: Alta IF

Senior career*
Years	Team	Apps	(Gls)
1993	IL Nordlys	22	(0)
1994–1995	FK Bodø/Glimt	21	(0)
1995	Alta IF	5	(1)
1996	IL Stalkameratene	16	(3)
1996–1997	Tromsdalen UIL	25	(10)
1998–2001	Tromsø IL	61	(0)
2000	Alta IF → loan	5	(0)
2002	Tromsdalen UIL	1	(0)
2003–2005	FK Bodø/Glimt	23	(0)
2005–	Alta IF	81	(9)
- * Club domestic league appearances and goals

Jan Egil Brekke (born 14 June 1974) is a Norwegian football midfielder who most recently played for Alta IF.

He has played in the Norwegian Premier League for FK Bodø/Glimt and Tromsø IL.

He grew up in Karasjok, and is the brother of fellow footballer Leif Arne Brekke. He has played for the Sápmi national football team.
