= Edna Moga Ramminger =

Brazilian pastor

Edna Moga Ramminger is a Brazilian theologian and pastor. Ordained on 13 November 1982, she was the first woman in Brazil to become a parish pastor in the Evangelical Church of the Lutheran Confession in Brazil.

On 13 November 1982, Ramminger, originally from Rio Claro, was ordained in Colorado do Oeste. She was not, however, the first woman in Brazil to have studied theology. Several others had graduated from the Faculty of Theology of São Leopoldo but had not entered the ministry. Rita Marta Panke was the first to serve the Lutheran Church, but she was not ordained. Now retired, Edna Moga Ramminger was ordained together with her husband Otto Hermann Ramminger. They have worked closely together.
