= Edna W. Underwood =

American poet

Edna Worthley Underwood (January 1873 – June 14, 1961) was an American author, poet, and translator.

== Biography ==
Born in Maine in January 1873, Edna Worthley received little education as a child, attending school occasionally, only when her family moved to Kansas in 1884. She undertook a program of extensive self-instruction, learning Latin and several of the major European languages. She began attendance at Garfield University in Wichita, Kansas, but later transferred to University of Michigan in Ann Arbor, where she received a B.A. in 1892.

Returning to Kansas, she taught at Arkansas City High School for three years before being dismissed because she refused to give up reading yellow-bound foreign-language books during her lunch hour, which her superiors believed to be dime novels.

After marrying Earl Underwood in August 1897, Edna moved to Kansas City and then to New York City. She immediately undertook various literary activities including the composition of poetry, plays and film scripts. Her first published book was a collaborative translation of a work by Nikolai Gogol in 1903.

The first published book that bore Underwood's name as author was the collection of short stories, A Book of Dear Dead Women (1911). With the sole exception of 'An Orchid of Asia', Underwood apparently wrote no more short stories. In 1919, she published Letters from a Prairie Garden, a collection of her letters to a famous artist who had visited the mid-West and undertaken a correspondence with her.

Underwood had published a book of poetry, The Garden of Desire (1913) but then turned to the writing of, for the most part, historical novels, drawing heavily upon the languages she had learned, the extensive travel she had undertaken, and her thorough grounding in history. The Whirlwind (1918) is about Catherine II of Russia. It was followed by The Penitent (1922), about Alexander I; The Passion Flower (1924), about Nicholas I and Alexander Pushkin. The Pageant-Maker was a novel planned but never completed or published. These novels gained favourable reviews, but by the late 1920s Underwood turned principally to poetry and translation. She had already issued translations from Polish (Sonnets from the Crimea, 1917) and other Slavic languages (Short Stories from the Balkans, 1919), as well as translations from Persian (Songs of Hafiz, 1917) and Japanese (Moons of Nippon, 1919). She then made several translations from the Chinese, including the eighth-century poet Tu Fu (now rendered as Du Fu); these translations were made in collaboration with Chi-Hwang Chu.

By the early 1930s she had turned to translating from the Spanish, including poets of Mexico, Haiti, and South America. She received wide recognition for her translations. The Latin American Institute of Culture of Buenos Aires awarded her the gold insignia for her Poets of Haiti (1935). Also, her translation of The Spirit of the Andes (1935), by the Peruvian poet Jose Santos Chocano, was dedicated by special permission to Alfonso XIII of Spain.

By 1940 Underwood appears to have given up her literary endeavours. She entered a sanatorium in 1953 suffering from dementia. She died on June 14, 1961.

Underwood's papers are collected at the Library of Kansas State University.
