= Adna (given name) =

Adna is a given name of Hebrew origin. Notable people with the name include:

- Adna Anderson (1827–1889), US engineer
- Adna Chaffee (1842–1914), Lieutenant General in the United States Army
- Adna R. Chaffee, Jr. (1884–1941), major general in the United States Army
- Joseph Adna Hill (1860–1938), American statistician
- Adna R. Johnson (1860–1938), U.S. Representative from Ohio
- Adna Wright Leonard (1874–1943), US Methodist bishop
- Adna mac Uthidir (fl. 1st-century AD), Irish poet
- LaMarcus Adna Thompson (1848–1919), US inventor and businessman
