= Edna Cooke Shoemaker =

American artist and illustrator (1889–1957)

Edna Cooke Shoemaker (June 19, 1889 – November 28, 1975) was an American artist and illustrator. Born in Philadelphia, she was the daughter of George Anderson and Elizabeth Ireton (Simon) Cook. She graduated from the Philadelphia High School for Girls in 1908 and was a student at the Pennsylvania Academy of the Fine Arts.

She illustrated magazine advertisements, magazine covers, including Ladies Home Journal (April 1920, June 1920, and August 1920); and Etude (October 1928); and children's books including Mother Goose, Heidi, Hans Brinker, Tommy Tip Toe, Stories of Mrs. Moleworth, Stories by Juliana Horatia Ewing, and East o’ the Sun, West o’ the Moon.

She married Orlando Shoemaker, a mechanical engineer, in 1924. They had three children.

Edna died at her home in Media, Pennsylvania, when she was 86 years old.
