= Eden T. Brekke =

American businessman and politician

- Brekke circa 1935 in Chicago
- Born: Edon Thoranius Brekke; December 22, 1893; Chicago, Illinois
- Died: July 29, 1978 (aged 84); Long Grove, Illinois
- Occupation: Commissioner of the West Chicago Park District

Eden Thoranius Brekke (December 21, 1893 – July 29, 1978) was a Chicago businessman and politician who served as the last Commissioner of the West Chicago Park District and was Republican Committeeman of the 36th Ward and 37th Ward.

== Biography ==
He was born as Edon Thoranius Brekke on December 21, 1893, in Chicago. He would later spell his name as "Eden". His siblings included: Mabel Brekke (1898–1980) who married a Bowie; John Brekke; and Evelyn Brekke who married a Mackett.

In 1910 Eden was working as a clerk and living at 815 North 51st in Chicago. Eden married Mae Danielson (1894–1986) in 1912. May was the daughter of Carrie Hansen. Together Mae and Eden had the following children: June E. Brekke (1914–1989) who married Charles N. Shaw; Donald E. Brekke (1915–1982) who died in Barrington; Fern M. Brekke (1917–1974) who married Stuart M. Williams (1913–1987); and William E. Brekke (1922–1990). On June 5, 1917, Eden registered for the draft for World War I while living at 1010 N. Latrobe Avenue and he was working as a coal and ice dealer.

Eden was working as a Superintendent of Parks for the City of Chicago from at least 1920. Charles Shaw writes:

Eden Brekke, was a rising Alderman and Committeeman for the 37th Ward, and the Commissioner of the West Chicago Park District, under the infamously corrupt William Hale "Big Bill" Thompson, chief political lickspittle to one Alphonse Capone. As Park Commissioner, my great-grandfather worked with the internationally renowned landscape architect Jens Jensen and his associates to build a number of smaller West Side parks including Austin, Davis, LaFollette, and Riis in the 37th Ward.

He was the 36th ward Republican committeeman from at least 1936 to 1956. In 1944 sought reelection in a difficult campaign. In 1956 a bomb was set off outside his house.

He died on July 29, 1978, at a nursing home in Long Grove, Illinois, and was buried in Mount Emblem Cemetery in Elmhurst, Illinois.
