= Supermodel Me =

Television series

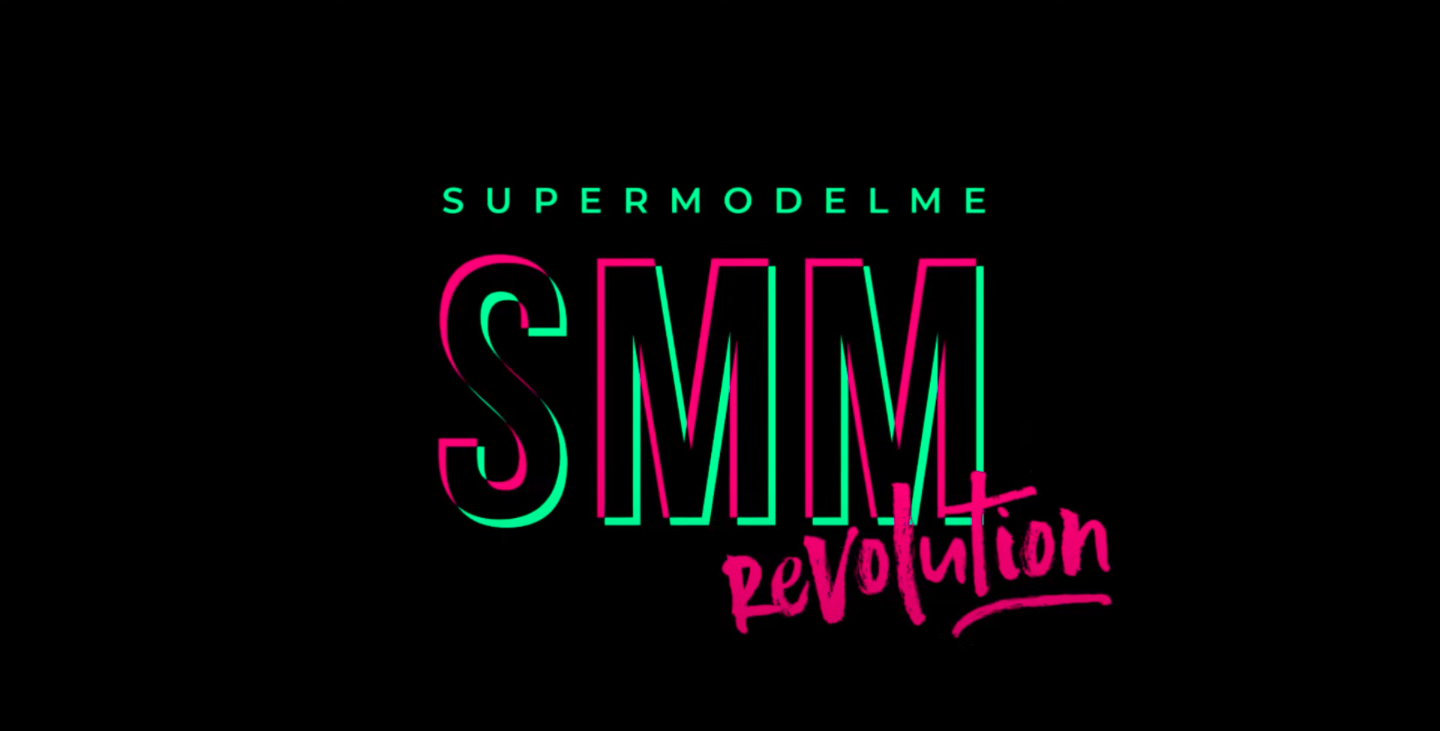
- Created by: Karen Seah
- Presented by: Charmaine Harn (1-2); Lisa Selesner (3-5); Cindy Bishop (6-present)
- Judges: Lisa Selesner (3-5); Dominic Lau (3-5); Ase Wang (3-present); Yu Tsai (6); Catriona Gray (6); Hanli Hoefer (6); Patricia Gouw (7-present)
- Theme music composer: Dave Tan
- Countries of origin: Hong Kong (4); Malaysia (5); Singapore (1-3, 6-current)
- Original language: English
- No. of seasons: 7
- No. of episodes: 118

Production
- Executive producer: Karen Seah
- Running time: 21-23 minutes (1-2); 60 minutes (3-6); 2-3 minutes (7)

Original release
- Network: AXN Asia (1, 6); KIX (2-3); Diva Universal (4-5); FlareFlow (7-present); TikTok (7-present)
- Release: June 16, 2009 – present

SupermodelMe is a multi-platform reality series in which a number aspiring models of Asian heritage compete for a chance to launch their career in the fashion industry.

Created by Karen Seah and produced by Refinery Media, SupermodelMe has run for three seasons and received nominations for "Best Cross-Platform Content" at the Asian Television Awards 2012 and "Best Non-Fiction" at the International Digital Emmy Awards in 2013.

The series was hosted by Singaporean model Charmaine Harn in its first two seasons. VJ and international Supermodel Lisa Selesner assumed the role of host from the third season to the fifth season. The latest two seasons are presented by Cindy Bishop, a Thai model and the former host of Asia's Next Top Model.

== Show format ==
Seasons 1 to 2 were 30-minute episodes and from Season 3, the show graduated to 60-minute episodes on cable, although on MediaCorp Channel 5, 30-minute episodes were specially produced. Throughout the series, the contestants are housed together under one roof and made to go through a series of tasks and photo-challenges, most of which bear a strong sporting and competitive angle. Each episode, one contestant is eliminated before a panel of judges until the winning model is chosen from a final three.

Show logo used from 2013 to 2014

== Transmedia presence ==
Supermodelme is an English language multi-platform, reality-based entertainment programme available across television, the internet and on mobile. Along with weekly television episodes, viewers can follow online webisodes that feature behind-the-scenes footage, extended footage and deleted scenes. Mobile content ranges from introductory biographies of the models to weekly "Confessional" videos. Supermodelme's cross-platform efforts earned it a nomination and "Highly Commended" position for "Best Cross-Platform Content" at the Asian Television Awards 2012, coming in behind CNN-IBN's "The Citizen Journalist Show".

=== Other technology integration ===
In 2010, Supermodelme became the first television showout of Asia to ink a deal with popular location-based application Foursquare. The collaboration saw the integration of brands such as DKNY Jeans, with followers of the branded Supermodelme game rewarded with discounts for every virtual ‘Check-In’. In 2011, Refinery Media entered into a partnership with Google's YouTube to distribute Supermodelme content on its site. Refinery Media also pioneered the use of “Hyperspot technology” with its integration into the show's website Supermodelme.tv. The use of “Hyperspot technology” on Supermodelme.tv allowed viewers to attain immediate information and access to whatever brands, products etc. they saw on screen while watching content on the website.

== Episodic breakdown ==
Sports & Action

Each episode, the models undertake a sports or action-oriented task that pits them against one another in a bid to determine one winner. The winner may receive prizes, rewards or in some cases, extra camera shots or time in their Photo Challenges. Following each task is a Photo Challenge, which is the key elimination element of the show. Here, the contestants are given a set number of camera shots to obtain their best picture for judging. The photo shoots require the utilization of skills acquired from the respective preceding physical tasks. After the photo challenge is over, the contestants will face Supermodelme's celebrity judging panel that will provide feedback on their performance and photographs and proceed to eliminate one contestant.

== Judges ==
| Judge | Seasons | | | | | | | |
| Judge | 1 (2009) | 2 (2011) | 3 (2012) | 4 (2013-2014) | 5 (2014-2015) | 6 (2021) | 7 (2026) | 8 (2026) |
|---|---|---|---|---|---|---|---|---|
| Charmaine Harn | Main | Main | | | | | | |
| Olivier Henry | Main | Main | | | | | | |
| Geoff Ang | Main | | | | | | | |
| Grace Lee | Main | | | | | | | |
| Jeanette Ejlersen | Main | | | | | | | |
| Elisabeth Gwee | | Main | Guest | | | | | |
| Terence Lee | | Main | | | | | | |
| Lee Zhuan | Guest | Main | | | | | | |
| Lisa Selesner | | | | Main | Main | Main | | |
| Ase Wang | | | Main | Main | Main | Main | Main | |
| Dominic Lau | | | Main | Main | Main | | | |
| Sharon Lim | | | Main | | | | | |
| Kim Robinson | | Guest | | Main | | | | |
| Cindy Bishop | | | Guest | | | Main | Main | Main |
| Yu Tsai | | | | | | Main | | |
| Catriona Gray | | | | | | Main | | |
| Hanli Hoefer | | | | | | Main | | |
| Patricia Gouw | | | | | | | Main | |
| Nguyễn Minh Tú | | | | | | | | Main |
| Brandon Espiritu | | | | | | | | Main |

== Series evolution ==
Season 1 of Supermodelme was initially produced for online consumption with 20 webisodes of 10–12 minute lengths and was broadcast on the website Supermodelme.tv. The show was subsequently picked up by cable channel AXN, reformatted for television broadcast and shown in 27 countries.

Season 2 saw Lionsgate's Celestial Tiger Entertainment co-produce Supermodelme for television broadcast in high definition. Weekly 30-minute episodes debuted on KIX and MediaCorp while the series retained its digital content and transmedia presence with accompanying webisodes and mobisodes.

Season 3 (Supermodel Me: Fast & Furious) of Supermodelme was co-produced through a tri-party deal between Celestial Tiger Entertainment, MediaCorp TV and Refinery Media. It saw the introduction of Lisa S., a new host.

Season 4 (Supermodel Me: Femme Fatale) and Season 5 (Supermodel Me: Sirens) have aired, launches on Diva (Asian TV channel) and Azio TV. Season 5 was take place in Malaysia.

Season 6 (Supermodel Me: Revolution) started to air in October 2021 after a seven-year hiatus, with the shooting location being moved back to Singapore. The previous judging panel are mostly replaced by the judging panel of Asia's Next Top Model, with Thai model Cindy Bishop appointed as host and head judge, and Yu Tsai appointed as creative consultant. Ase Wang will return to the judging panel for the fourth time. The show will also mark as the debut of Catriona Gray and Hanli Hoefer in the show's judging panel. Asia's Next Top Model Dana Slosar and Monika Santa Maria were added as the task master.

Season 7 (Supermodel Me: Make It or Break It) released on 18 August 2026 exclusively on FlareFlow and TikTok Mini Drama Series. This is the first vertical reality season. Cindy Bishop and Ase Wang retained their positions in the judging Panel. Patricia Gouw replaced all other judges from the previous season. The season was recorded in Singapore sometime around April or May.

Season 8 (Supermodel Me: The Runway Kings) Set to be the franchises Eighth Season, this season will be the first season featuring an all-male cast. The season will be released sometime in October 2026 and will also use Vertical Reality. The judging panel will consist of Cindy Bishop, Nguyễn Minh Tú, and Brandon Espiritu. The season was recorded in Singapore sometime around April or May.

== Partnerships ==
In 2010 Celestial Tiger Entertainment, the Asian arm of Lionsgate, entered into a partnership with Refinery Media to produce Season 2 and 3 of Supermodelme while additionally securing the rights to broadcast Season 1.

It was announced in 2012 that Supermodelme would make its first foray into China through Sohu and Qiyi and the United States via MYX TV, with the network purchasing the rights to all three seasons of the series. In addition, Supermodelme announced in July 2012 a collaboration with Audi Fashion Festival (AFF) 2013 – the largest annual fashion event in Singapore.

== Series overview ==
| Cycle | Premiere date | Winner | Runner-up | Other contestants in order of elimination | Number of contestants | International Destinations |
|---|---|---|---|---|---|---|
| 1 Singapore | 16 June 2009 | Evelyn Leckie | Christabel Campbell | Helen Swale, Emilia Soh, Yuen Sze Jia, Ciara Schmalfeld, Jenny Fuglsang, Fiona Thomas, Anna Syuhada, Kathlene McKinney | 10 | None |
| 2 Singapore | 17 March 2011 | Avalon Haloho | Melinda Widjanarko | Niki Niu (quit), Syakella Jazmyn-Saiden, Roshni Kaur Soin, Emiko Thein & Anny Lou, Kiani Lee, Elizabeth Moulden, Tanja Widing, Rosie Choovichian, Kym Toussaint | 12 | Bali |
| 3 Singapore | 13 March 2012 | Tiffany Warne | Nansi Sanya | Petrina Pinto, Lynn Yang Wolf (disqualified), Lila Swain, Charlotte Beck, Danielle Lim, Isabelle Du, Venus Hung, Deanna Ibrahim, Jacqueline Milner, Asha Cuthbert | 12 | None |
| 4 Hong Kong | 18 November 2013 | Katherine Rigby | Sasha Quahe | Karina Curlewis, Stephanie Shen, Chloe Lane, Georgie Gampang-Millar, Ashleigh Martin, Dominique Nguyen, Roelene Coleman, Yumika Hoskin, Lilly Nguyen, Ying Liu | 12 | Macau |
| 5 Malaysia | 24 November 2014 | Alexandria Brouhard | Gabriela Leonardo | Nadia Christian, Francine Zauner, Irish Ong, Kea Lee, Nicole Söderström, Jasmine Ng, Sharin Keong, Shi Lim, Victoria Blom, Rafaella Leonardo | 12 | None |
| 6 Singapore | 11 October 2021 | Quỳnh Anh Nguyễn | Nikki de Moura | Claire Lee, Cassandra Laforteza, Wiwi Nguyễn, Jennifer Fredin, Prisca Klose, Melanie Fernandez, TJ Bennett, Isabelle Zhang, Zeline Prabowo, Hannah Cheng-Bradshaw | 12 | None |
| 7 Singapore | 18 August 2026 | Habie Mondido | Dabi Lee | Ketty Chang & Ashley Soo, Moonique Larsen & Juhi Nar Singh, Tatyana Alexi Austria & Mint Ngọc, Nara Rahayu & Cathrina Torres | 10 | None |

=== SupermodelMe: The Runway Kings ===
| Cycle | Premiere date | Winner | Runner-up | Other contestants in order of elimination | Number of contestants | International Destinations |
|---|---|---|---|---|---|---|
| 1 Singapore | 9 October 2026 | Sahil Sharma | Albert Trần | Noel Hein & Nathanael Driyanto, Jaxson Huang & Julian Pieringer, Stephen Kutamura & Raihan Fahrizal Iskandar, Yunus Yanin Abdullahoglu, Noah Alvarez Webb | 10 | None |

== Contestants per country ==
This is the list of each contestants that competed in Supermodel Me, each country has 1-3 representatives per edition.

SupermodelMe contestants per country
| Country/Region | Season | | | | | | | |
| Country/Region | 1 | 2 | 3 | 4 | 5 | 6 | 7 | 8 |
|---|---|---|---|---|---|---|---|---|
| Australia | **Evelyn Leckie** Fiona Thomas Helen Swale | **Avalon Haloho** Kym Toussaint Elizabeth Moulden Kiani Lee | **Tiffany Warne** Lilanette Swain | —N/a | | | | |
| China | —N/a | Anny Lou Niki Niu (Note: The contestant decided to quit the competition.) | —N/a | Stephanie Shen Ying Liu | —N/a | Isabelle Zhang | —N/a | |
| Hong Kong | —N/a | | Asha Cuthbert Venus Hung | **Katherine Rigby** | —N/a | TJ Bennett | —N/a | Jaxson Wong |
| India | —N/a | | | Roelene Coleman | —N/a | | | **Sahil Sharma** |
| Indonesia | —N/a | Melinda Widjanarko | —N/a | | Francine Zauner | Zeline Prabowo | Ketty Chang Nara Vina Rahayu | Nathanael Driyanto Raihan Fahrizal Iskandar |
| Japan | —N/a | | | Yumika Hoskin | Gabriela Leonardo Rafaella Leonardo | —N/a | | |
| Malaysia | Anna Syuhada Yuen Sze Jia | Syakella Jazmyn | Deanna Ibrahim | Georgie Millar | Kea Lee | Prisca Klose | —N/a | |
| Myanmar | —N/a | | Lynn Yang Wolf (Note: The contestant was disqualified in her respective season.) | —N/a | | | | Noel Hein |
| Philippines | —N/a | | Jacqueline Milner | Karina Curlewis | Irish Ong Jasmine Ng | Nikki de Moura Cassandra Laforteza; Melanie Fernandez | **Habie Mondido** Cathrina Torres; Tatyana Austria | Noah Webb Stephen Kutamura |
| Singapore | Christabel Campbell Emilia Soh | Emiko Thein; Roshni Soin | Danielle Lim; Petrina Ann | Ashleigh Martin Sasha Quahe | Sharin Keong; Shi Lim | Claire Lee Hannah Cheng-Bradshaw | Ashley Soo; Juhi Nar Singh | —N/a |
| South Korea | Jenny Fuglsang | —N/a | | | **Alexandria Brouhard** Nadia Christian | —N/a | Dabi (Jisu Lee) | —N/a |
| Thailand | Kathlene McKinney | Rosie Choovichian Tanja Widing | Charlotte Beck Nansi Sanya | Chloe Lane | Nicole Söderström Victoria Blom | Jennifer Fredin | Moonique Larsen | Yunus Yanin |
| Taiwan | —N/a | | | | | | | Julian Pieringer |
| USA | Ciara Schmalfeld | —N/a | | | | | | |
| Vietnam | —N/a | | Isabelle Du | Dominique Nguyen Lilly Nguyen | —N/a | **Nguyễn Quỳnh Anh** Wiwi Nguyễn | Mint (Ngô Bảo Ngọc) | Albert Tran |

The contestant in bold won in her respective season.
The contestant in italic placed as a runner-up in her respective season.

== Distributions ==
Supermodelme has distribution in 13 countries across the globe with a cable television reach of about 30 million people. It is also available all over the world (except China) on Netflix, in original language (English) and subtitles.

From Season 7, the distribution of Supermodelme is available on FlareFlow App and TikTok Mini Me Drama Series.

| Country | Provider |
|---|---|
| Singapore | MediaCorp Channel 5, Singtel Mio TV, Celestial Tiger, KIX |
| Malaysia | Astro, Celestial Tiger, KIX |
| Korea | Celestial Tiger, KIX |
| Philippines | Skycable, Celestial Tiger, KIX |
| Indonesia | Indovision, Centrin TV, Skynindo, Groovia TV, Aora, OkeVision, Celestial Tiger, KIX |
| Cambodia | Celestial Tiger, KIX |
| Vietnam | Celestial Tiger, KIX |
| Thailand | bbtv, 1-Sky, Celestial Tiger, KIX |
| Hong Kong | TVB Pearl, bbtv, now TV |
| USA | DIRECTV, Myx TV, RCN, Time Warner Cable, Cox |
| China | Sohu.com, Qiyi.com |
