= Supermodel Me season 4 =

Supermodel Me
- Season 4
- Season 4 cast
- Judges: Lisa Selesner; Ase Wang; Dominic Lau; Kim Robinson
- No. of contestants: 12
- Winner: Katherine Rigby
- No. of episodes: 12

Release
- Original network: AXN, Diva Universal, Azio TV
- Original release: 18 November 2013 – 3 February 2014

Season chronology
- ← Previous; Season 3 Next → Season 5

The fourth season of Supermodel Me or (Supermodel Me: Femme Fatale) aired in 2013, with the shooting location being moved from Singapore to Hong Kong. The judging panel this season include Lisa Selesner, Ase Wang, Dom Lau and Kim Robinson. Special appearances for the show included: Kevin Ou, Gordon Lam, Qi Qi, Queenie Chu, Jennifer Tse, Zing, Ananda Everingham, Carmen Soo, Alvin Goh.

This Season 4 have aired, launches on Diva (Asian TV channel), Azio TV, and was subsequently picked up by cable channel AXN, reformatted for television broadcast and shown in 27 countries. Along with weekly television episodes, viewers can follow online webisodes that feature behind-the-scenes footage, extended footage and deleted scenes.

This season will feature 12 contestants; two each from China, Singapore and Vietnam, one each from Hong Kong, India, Japan, Malaysia, the Philippines and Thailand.

The prizes for this cycle were a modelling contract with the top agency in Asia, appeared on a 12-page magazine editorials spread of Prestige Hong Kong, a cash prize of 35.000S$ and will be the face of AFF Fashion Show 2014.

The winner was 22-year-old Katherine Rigby from Hong Kong.

== Contestants ==
(Ages stated are at time of contest)

Country	Contestant	Age	Hometown	Finish	Place
Philippines	Karina Curlewis	22	1.70 m (5 ft 7 in)	Episode 1	12
China	Stephanie Shen	23	1.80 m (5 ft 11 in)	Episode 2	11
Thailand	Chloe Lane	25	1.68 m (5 ft 6 in)	Episode 3	10
Malaysia	Georgie Millar	23	1.73 m (5 ft 8 in)	Episode 4	9
Singapore	Ashleigh Martin	21	1.70 m (5 ft 7 in)	Episode 5	8
Vietnam	Dominique Nguyễn	24	1.71 m (5 ft 7 1/2 in)	Episode 7	7
India	Roelene Coleman	19	1.75 m (5 ft 9 in)	Episode 8	6
Japan	Yumika Hoskin	24	1.74 m (5 ft 8 1/2 in)	Episode 9	5
Vietnam	Lilly Nguyễn	19	1.75 m (5 ft 9 in)	Episode 10	4
China	Ying Liu	25	1.88 m (6 ft 2 in)	Episode 12	3
Singapore	Sasha Quahe	19	1.74 m (5 ft 8 1/2 in)	Episode 12	2
Hong Kong	Katherine Rigby	22	1.77 m (5 ft 9 1/2 in)	Episode 12	1

== Results ==
Order	Episodes										
Order	1	2	3	4	5	6	7	8	9	10	12
1	Ying	Katherine	Ying	Lilly	Lilly	Katherine	Yumika	Sasha	Lilly	Sasha	Katherine
2	Roelene	Lilly	Katherine	Yumika	Roelene	Sasha	Sasha	Ying	Katherine	Katherine	Sasha
3	Katherine	Ying	Ashleigh	Sasha	Ying	Roelene	Ying	Katherine	Sasha	Ying	Ying
4	Ashleigh	Georgie	Lilly	Roelene	Yumika	Dominique	Lilly	Yumika	Ying	Lilly	
5	Lilly	Dominique	Roelene	Ying	Katherine	Ying	Katherine	Lilly	Yumika		
6	Sasha	Ashleigh	Dominique	Dominique	Dominique	Yumika	Roelene	Roelene			
7	Yumika	Sasha	Yumika	Ashleigh	Sasha	Lilly	Dominique				
8	Chloe	Chloe	Sasha	Katherine	Ashleigh						
9	Dominique	Yumika	Georgie	Georgie							
10	Georgie	Roelene	Chloe								
11	Stephanie	Stephanie									
12	Karina										

The contestant was eliminated
The contestant was originally eliminated from the competition but was saved
The contestant won the competition
.

=== Runaway guide ===
- Episode 1 = Insectivora Tunnel Fashion
- Episode 2 = Runway Style Of 12 Months
- Episode 3 = Upscale End Street Show Above The Lakes In Pairs
- Episode 4 = Chinese New Year Special Runway
- Episode 5 = Elegance Performance Show Of "Mermaid Fairy Art" Above Water With Fish
- Episode 6 = Survival Runway Challenge
- Episode 7 = High Fashion Catwalk In The Air With The Theme "Hanging Against Gravity With The Obstacle In Fashion"
- Episode 8 = "Out Of The Death To Redemption" With Mystique Avant Garde Show
- Episode 9 = Caribbean Style Undersea Runway
- Episode 10 = Road Of Finale Spectacular Catwalk Show In Ice Lake Resort Canada
- Episode 12 = Modern Korean Culture Runway Show At Kyongbokkung Temple, Korean-Pop Superstar Special Finale Catwalk Show

=== Average call-out order ===
Final three is not included.

Rank by average	Place	Model	Call-out total	Number of call-outs	Call-out average
1	3	Ying	30	10	3.00
2	1	Katherine	32	10	3.20
3	4	Lilly	34	10	3.40
4	2	Sasha	40	10	4.00
5	6	Roelene	38	8	4.75
6	5	Yumika	45	9	5.00
7	8	Ashleigh	28	5	5.60
8	7	Dominique	43	7	6.14
9	9	Georgie	32	4	8.00
10	10	Chloe	26	3	8.67
11	11	Stephanie	22	2	11.00
12	12	Karina	12	1	12.00

== Bottom three/two ==
Episode	Contestants			Eliminated
1	Karina, Stephanie, & Georgie			Karina
2	Roelene, Stephanie, & Yumika			Stephanie
3	Sasha, Georgie, & Chloe			Chloe
4	Katherine, Georgie, & Ashleigh			Georgie
5	Sasha, Ashleigh, & Dominique			Ashleigh
6	Yumika, Lilly, & Ying			None
7	Katherine, Roelene, & Dominique			Dominique
8	Roelene, Yumika, & Lilly			Roelene
9	Ying	&	Yumika	Yumika
10	Ying	&	Lilly	Lilly
12	Katherine, Sasha, & Ying			Ying
12	Katherine	&	Sasha	Sasha

The contestant was eliminated after their first time in the bottom two/three
The contestant was eliminated after their second time in the bottom two/three
The contestant was eliminated after their third time in the bottom two/three
The contestant was eliminated after their fourth time in the bottom two/three
The contestant was eliminated after their fifth time in the bottom two/three
The contestant was eliminated in the first round of elimination and placed third
The contestant was eliminated and placed as the runner-up
