= Supermodel Me season 3 =

Supermodel Me
- Season 3
- Judges: Lisa Selesner; Ase Wang; Dominic Lau; Sharon Lim
- No. of contestants: 12
- Winner: Tiffany Leigh Warne
- No. of episodes: 12

Release
- Original network: KIX, MYX
- Original release: 13 March – 29 May 2012

Season chronology
- ← Previous; Season 2 Next → Season 4

The third season of Supermodel Me or (Supermodel Me: Fast & Furious) aired in 2013, with the shooting location in Singapore.

From this season: the show will aired from 30 to 60 minute and the entire judging panel change (Lisa Selesner will replace Charmaine Harn as the host with 3 brand new resident judges: Actress & Model Ase Wang, Model & TV Host Dom Lau and Editor-in-Chief of Elle Singapore Sharon Lim). Special appearances for the show included: Deborah Henry, Wykidd Song, Marcus A. C, Junita Simon, Jennifer Tse, Joanne Peh, Utt, Qi Qi, Elisabeth Gwee, Rebecca Lim, Ana R, Lum May Yee, Danielle Graham, Daniel Boey, Cindy Bishop, Kevin Ou. Same as the previous season, this third season was aired in HD quality on MYX TV Channel across Asia.

This third season has received some nominations for "Best Cross-Platform Content" at the Asian Television Awards 2012 and "Best Non-Fiction" at the International Digital Emmy Awards in 2013.

It was announced that Supermodelme season 3 would make its first foray into China through Sohu and Qiyi and the United States via MYX TV, with the network purchasing the rights to all three seasons of the series. In addition, Supermodelme announced in July 2012 a collaboration with Audi Fashion Festival (AFF) 2013 - the largest annual fashion event in Singapore.

This season will feature 12 contestants; two each from Australia, Hong Kong, Singapore and Thailand, one each from Malaysia, Myanmar, the Philippines and Vietnam.

The prizes for this cycle were a modelling contract with the top agency in Singapore, a modelling contract with Model One in Hong Kong and a cash prize of 20.000S$.

The winner was 18-year-old Tiffany Leigh Warne from Australia.

== Contestants ==
(Ages stated are at time of contest)

Country	Contestant	Age	Height	Finish	Place
Singapore	Petrina Ann	18	1.75 m (5 ft 9 in)	Episode 1	12
Myanmar	Lynn Yang Wolf	22	1.70 m (5 ft 7 in)	Episode 3	11 (DQ)
Australia	Lila Swain	22	1.73 m (5 ft 8 in)	Episode 3	10
Thailand	Charlotte Beck	22	1.68 m (5 ft 6 in)	Episode 4	9
Singapore	Danielle Lim	23	1.76 m (5 ft 9 1/2 in)	Episode 5	8
Vietnam	Isabelle Du	26	1.69 m (5 ft 6 1/2 in)	Episode 6	7
Hong Kong	Venus Hung	21	1.78 m (5 ft 10 in)	Episode 7	6
Malaysia	Deanna Ibrahim	27	1.75 m (5 ft 9 in)	Episode 8	5
Philippines	Jacqueline Milner	18	1.75 m (5 ft 9 in)	Episode 10	4
Hong Kong	Asha Cuthbert	20	1.72 m (5 ft 7 1/2 in)	Episode 12	3
Thailand	Nansi Sanya	22	1.74 m (5 ft 8 1/2 in)	Episode 12	2
Australia	Tiffany Warne	18	1.73 m (5 ft 8 in)	Episode 12	1

== Results ==
Order	Episodes										
Order	1	2	3	4	5	6	7	8	9	10	12
1	Deanna	Charlotte	Deanna	Tiffany	Tiffany	Jacqueline	Tiffany	Jacqueline	Jacqueline	Tiffany	Tiffany
2	Jacqueline	Asha	Tiffany	Asha	Nansi	Asha	Asha	Tiffany	Tiffany	Asha	Nansi
3	Nansi	Lynn	Nansi	Deanna	Venus	Deanna	Nansi	Asha	Nansi	Nansi	Asha
4	Isabelle	Lila	Isabelle	Nansi	Deanna	Nansi	Jacqueline	Nansi	Asha	Jacqueline	
5	Venus	Isabelle	Charlotte	Isabelle	Jacqueline	Venus	Deanna	Deanna			
6	Asha	Jacqueline	Venus	Venus	Asha	Tiffany	Venus				
7	Lynn	Nansi	Jacqueline	Danielle	Isabelle	Isabelle					
8	Danielle	Danielle	Asha	Jacqueline	Danielle						
9	Tiffany	Venus	Danielle	Charlotte							
10	Lila	Tiffany	Lila								
11	Charlotte	Deanna	Lynn								
12	Petrina										

The contestant was eliminated
The contestant was immune from elimination
The contestant was disqualified from the competition
The contestant was originally eliminated from the competition but was saved
The contestant won the competition

- In episode 3, Jacqueline and Lynn broke the competitions rules by sneaking out of the model's house without permission. Therefore, the producers have to ask 8 remaining girls to vote the one who should be disqualified. As a result, Lynn got the most votes and is disqualified. At the elimination, Deanna, who was eliminated in previous episode, return into the competition.
- In episode 9, Asha was originally eliminated from the competition but was saved by Lisa
- Episode 11 was the recap episode.

=== Photo shoot guide ===
- Episode 1 photo shoot: La Perla swimwear at the abandoned house
- Episode 2 photo shoot: Velvet Underground shoot inside Zouk Club in groups with male models
- Episode 3 photo shoot: Running in the forest on a treadmill runway
- Episode 4 photo shoot: La Perla Lingerie With a Horse
- Episode 5 photo shoot: Last kiss inside a car with Utt
- Episode 6 photo shoot: Underwater
- Episode 7 photo shoot: Roller Girls
- Episode 8 photo shoot: Bank Robbery
- Episode 9 photo shoot: Wire Stunt Fighter
- Episode 10 photo shoot: Rockstars
- Episode 12 photo shoot: Beautiful chaos at the race track

=== Average call-out order ===
Final three is not included.

Rank by average	Place	Model	Call-out total	Number of call-outs	Call-out average
1	1	Tiffany	34	10	3.40
2	2	Nansi	35	10	3.50
3	3	Asha	36	10	3.60
4	4	Jacqueline	38	10	3.80
5	5	Deanna	32	7	4.57
6	11	Lynn	10	2	5.00
7	7	Isabelle	31	6	5.17
8	6	Venus	39	7	5.57
9	9	Charlotte	25	4	6.25
10	8	Danielle	39	5	7.80
11	10	Lila	24	3	8.00
12	12	Petrina	12	1	12.00

== Bottom three/two ==
Episode	Contestants			Eliminated
1	Charlotte	Petrina	Lila	Petrina
2	Venus	Deanna	Tiffany	Deanna
3	Danielle	Asha	Lila	Lila
4	Charlotte	Danielle	Jacqueline	Charlotte
5	Danielle	Asha	Isabelle	Danielle
6	Venus	Tiffany	Isabelle	Isabelle
7	Venus	&	Deanna	Venus
8	Nansi	&	Deanna	Deanna
9	Nansi	&	Asha	None
10	Nansi	&	Jacqueline	Jacqueline
12	Nansi	Asha	Tiffany	Asha
12	Nansi	&	Tiffany	Nansi

The contestant was eliminated after their first time in the bottom two/three
The contestant was eliminated after their second time in the bottom two/three
The contestant was eliminated after their third time in the bottom two/three
The contestant was eliminated after their fourth time in the bottom two/three
The contestant was eliminated after their fifth time in the bottom two/three
The contestant was eliminated in the first round of elimination and placed third
The contestant was eliminated and placed as the runner-up
