= Supermodel Me season 2 =

Supermodel Me
- Season 2
- Judges: Charmaine Harn; Olivier Henry; Elisabeth Gwee; Terence Lee; Lee Zhuan
- No. of contestants: 12
- Winner: Avalon Hona Haloho Sinabutar
- No. of episodes: 12

Release
- Original network: KIX, MYX
- Original release: 17 March – 2 June 2011

Season chronology
- ← Previous; Season 1 Next → Season 3

The second season of Supermodel Me aired in 2011, with the shooting location in Singapore. The judging panel this season include Charmaine Harn, Geoff Ang, Olivier Henry, Elisabeth Gwee, Terence Lee and Lee Zhuan. Special appearances for the show included: Nadya Hutagalung, Antonia Chang, Paul Foster, Amber Chia, Deborah Henry, Rebecca Tan, Kim Robinson, Furqan Saini, Grego Oh, Gaile Lai. The premiere of thus season was held on March 17, 2011, in Marina Bay Sands - Singapore, the event was also attended by the previous winner Evelyn Alice Leckie.

This season also remarks Supermodel Me became the first television showout of Asia to ink a deal with popular location-based application Foursquare. The collaboration saw the integration of brands such as DKNY Jeans, with followers of the branded Supermodelme game rewarded with discounts for every virtual ‘Check-In’. In this season, Refinery Media entered into a partnership with Google - YouTube to distribute Supermodelme content on its site. Refinery Media also pioneered the use of “Hyperspot technology” with its integration into the show's website Supermodelme.tv, the use of “Hyperspot technology” on Supermodelme.tv allowed viewers to attain immediate information and access to whatever brands, products etc. they saw on screen while watching content on the website. This season also aired for the first time in HD quality on the MYX television channel.

This season will feature 12 contestants; four from Australia, two each from China, Singapore, Thailand, one from Indonesia, and Malaysia. The prizes for this cycle were a cash prize of 20,000S$ value FEVO Mastercard and many other prizes from the sponsors.

The winner was 16-year-old Avalon Hona Haloho Sinabutar from Australia.

== Contestants ==
(Ages stated are at time of contest)

Country	Contestant	Age	Height	Finish	Place
China	Niki Niu	23	1.78 m (5 ft 10 in)	Episode 1	12 (quit)
Malaysia	Syakella Jazmyn-Saiden	23	1.74 m (5 ft 8 1/2 in)	Episode 2	11
Singapore	Roshni Kaur Soin	23	1.74 m (5 ft 8 1/2 in)	Episode 3	10
China	Anny Lou Yu Jie	20	1.68 m (5 ft 6 in)	Episode 5	9-8
Singapore	Emiko Thein Lin Min Yi	21	1.77 m (5 ft 9 1/2 in)	Episode 5	9-8
Australia	Kiani Trisna Lee	17	1.74 m (5 ft 8 1/2 in)	Episode 6	7
Australia	Elizabeth Moulden	17	1.72 m (5 ft 7 1/2 in)	Episode 7	6
Thailand	Tanja Felicia Widing	20	1.78 m (5 ft 10 in)	Episode 8	5
Thailand	Nattakorn 'Rosie' Choovichian	24	1.75 m (5 ft 9 in)	Episode 10	4
Australia	Kym Toussaint Rosser	21	1.73 m (5 ft 8 in)	Episode 12	3
Indonesia	Melinda Priskila Widjanarko	25	1.79 m (5 ft 10 1/2 in)	Episode 12	2
Australia	Avalon Hona Haloho Sinabutar	16	1.73 m (5 ft 8 in)	Episode 12	1

== Results ==
Order	Episodes									
Order	1	2	3	4	5	6	7	8	10	12
1	Elizabeth	Rosie	Kym	Anny	Rosie	Tanja	Avalon	Avalon	Avalon	Avalon
2	Kym	Kym	Rosie	Melinda	Melinda	Rosie	Melinda	Kym	Melinda	Melinda
3	Anny	Melinda	Elizabeth	Kym	Avalon	Kym	Rosie	Rosie	Kym	Kym
4	Tanja	Avalon	Avalon	Kiani	Elizabeth	Elizabeth	Kym	Melinda	Rosie	
5	Kiani	Elizabeth	Kiani	Rosie	Tanja	Melinda	Tanja	Tanja		
6	Emiko	Tanja	Tanja	Avalon	Kym	Avalon	Elizabeth			
7	Rosie	Kiani	Anny	Tanja	Kiani	Kiani				
8	Syakella	Emiko	Melinda	Emiko	Anny; Emiko					
9	Avalon	Anny	Emiko	Elizabeth	Anny; Emiko					
10	Roshni	Roshni	Roshni							
11	Niki	Syakella								
12	Melinda									

The contestant was eliminated
The contestant quit the competition
The contestant was originally eliminated but was saved
The contestant won the competition

- In episode 1, Melinda was safe due to Niki quitting.
- In episode 9, there was no call-out and elimination
- Episode 11 was the recap episode.

=== Photo shoot guide ===
- Episode 1 photo shoot: Rugby player in group
- Episode 2 photo shoot: Jurong Fishery Port catwalk
- Episode 3 photo shoot: La Perla lingerie
- Episode 4 photo shoot: Girl Fight
- Episode 5 photo shoot: Balancing on Club21b outfit with balloon
- Episode 6 photo shoot: Runaway debutanted
- Episode 7 photo shoot: Close-up beauty shot
- Episode 8 photo shoot: La Perla bikini in Bali
- Episode 9 photo shoot: B&W body cover of clay properties at the beach
- Episode 10 photo & commercial: DKNY jeans beside the pool
- Episode 12 photo shoot: Greek goddesses

=== Average call-out order ===
Final three is not included.

Rank by average	Place	Model	Call-out total	Number of call-outs	Call-out average
1	3	Kym	26	9	2.89
2	4	Rosie	28	9	3.11
3	1	Avalon	35	9	3.89
4	2	Melinda	40	9	4.44
5	6	Elizabeth	32	7	4.57
6	5	Tanja	39	8	4.88
7	8-9	Anny	28	5	5.60
8	7	Kiani	35	6	5.83
9	8-9	Emiko	39	5	7.80
10	11	Syakella	19	2	9.50
11	10	Roshni	30	3	10.00
12	12	Niki	11	1	11.00

== Bottom two ==
Episode	Contestants			Eliminated
1	Niki	&	Melinda	Niki
2	Roshni	&	Syakella	Syakella
3	Emiko	&	Roshni	Roshni
4	Emiko	&	Elizabeth	None
5	Anny	&	Emiko	Anny
5	Anny	&	Emiko	Emiko
6	Avalon	&	Kiani	Kiani
7	Tanja	&	Elizabeth	Elizabeth
8	Melinda	&	Tanja	Tanja
10	Kym	&	Rosie	Rosie
12	Avalon	Melinda	Kym	Kym
12	Avalon	&	Melinda	Melinda

The contestant withdrew from the competition
The contestant was eliminated after their first time in the bottom two/three
The contestant was eliminated after their second time in the bottom two/three
The contestant was eliminated after their third time in the bottom two/three
The contestant was eliminated after their fourth time in the bottom two/three
The contestant was eliminated after their fifth time in the bottom two/three
The contestant was eliminated in the first round of elimination and placed third
The contestant was eliminated and placed as the runner-up
