= Supermodel Me season 5 =

Supermodel Me
- Season 5
- Judges: Lisa Selesner; Ase Wang; Dominic Lau
- No. of contestants: 12
- Winner: Alexandria Brouhard
- No. of episodes: 12

Release
- Original network: Diva Universal, Azio TV
- Original release: 24 November 2014 – 9 February 2015

Season chronology
- ← Previous; Season 4 Next → Season 6

The fifth season of Supermodel Me or (Supermodel Me: Sirens) aired in 2014, with the shooting location being moved from Hong Kong to Malaysia. The judging panel this season include Lisa Selesner, Ase Wang and Dom Lau.

This fifth season have aired, launches on Diva (Asian TV channel) and Azio TV. This season 5 was also take place in Kuala Lumpur, Malaysia for the very first time in Supermodel Me show history.

This season will feature 12 contestants; two each from Japan, the Philippines, Singapore, South Korea and Thailand, one each from Indonesia and Malaysia.

The prizes for this cycle were a modelling contract with Premier Model Management in London and a cash prize of S$35,000.

The winner was 26-year-old Alexandria Brouhard from South Korea.

== Contestants ==
(Ages stated are at time of contest)

Country	Contestant	Age	Hometown	Finish	Place
South Korea	Nadia Christian	25	1.75 m (5 ft 9 in)	Episode 1	12
Indonesia	Francine Zauner	21	1.72 m (5 ft 7 1/2 in)	Episode 2	11
Philippines	Irish Ong	20	1.78 m (5 ft 10 in)	Episode 3	10
Malaysia	Kea Lee	21	1.76 m (5 ft 9 1/2 in)	Episode 4	9
Thailand	Nicole Söderström	24	1.75 m (5 ft 9 in)	Episode 5	8
Philippines	Jasmine Ng	21	1.70 m (5 ft 7 in)	Episode 6	7
Singapore	Sharin Keong	22	1.72 m (5 ft 7 1/2 in)	Episode 7	6
Singapore	Shi Lim	25	1.77 m (5 ft 9 1/2 in)	Episode 9	5
Thailand	Victoria Lisa Chaon Blom	20	1.78 m (5 ft 10 in)	Episode 10	4
Japan	Rafaella Leonardo	21	1.74 m (5 ft 8 1/2 in)	Episode 12	3
Japan	Gabriela Leonardo	21	1.75 m (5 ft 9 in)	Episode 12	2
South Korea	Alexandria Brouhard	26	1.72 m (5 ft 7 1/2 in)	Episode 12	1

== Results ==
Order	Episodes										
Order	1	2	3	4	5	6	7	8	9	10	12
1	Alexandria	Rafaella	Victoria	Jasmine	Gabriela	Gabriela	Alexandria	Shi	Gabriela	Rafaella	Alexandria
2	Gabriela	Alexandria	Gabriela	Nicole	Victoria	Alexandria	Gabriela	Rafaella	Rafaella	Alexandria	Gabriela
3	Sharin	Sharin	Rafaella	Shi	Alexandria	Rafaella	Rafaella	Alexandria	Alexandria	Gabriela	Rafaella
4	Rafaella	Victoria	Alexandria	Alexandria	Shi	Sharin	Victoria	Gabriela	Victoria	Victoria	
5	Victoria	Irish	Shi	Gabriela	Rafaella	Victoria	Shi	Victoria	Shi		
6	Shi	Gabriela	Jasmine	Victoria	Jasmine	Shi	Sharin				
7	Jasmine	Shi	Nicole	Rafaella	Sharin	Jasmine					
8	Irish	Kea	Kea	Sharin	Nicole						
9	Kea	Nicole	Sharin	Kea							
10	Francine	Jasmine	Irish								
11	Nicole	Francine									
12	Nadia										

The contestant was eliminated
The contestant was originally eliminated from the competition but was saved
The contestant won the competition

- In episode 8, Victoria was originally eliminated from the competition but was saved by Lisa
- Episode 11 was the recap episode.

=== Photo shoot guide ===
- Episode 1 photo shoot: Deadly Sirens
- Episode 2 photo shoot: Natural shoot
- Episode 3 photo shoot: Snake Instinct
- Episode 4 photo shoot: Fight Club with male model
- Episode 5 photo shoot: Krumping Block Party
- Episode 6 photo shoot: Living Mannequins
- Episode 7 photo shoot: Bold & Fearless Woman
- Episode 8 photo shoot: Journey Through Time watch in an old fashion love story
- Episode 9 photo shoot: Castaway
- Episode 10 video shoot: Versatility as Models
- Episode 12 photo shoot: Blazing Sirens

=== Average call-out order ===
Final three is not included.

Rank by average	Place	Model	Call-out total	Number of call-outs	Call-out average
1	1	Alexandria	24	10	2.40
2	2	Gabriela	27	10	2.70
3	3	Rafaella	32	10	3.20
4	4	Victoria	40	10	4.00
5	5	Shi	42	9	4.67
6	6	Sharin	39	7	5.57
7	7	Jasmine	37	6	6.17
8	8	Nicole	37	5	7.40
9	10	Irish	23	3	7.67
10	9	Kea	34	4	8.50
11	11	Francine	21	2	10.50
12	12	Nadia	12	1	12.00

== Bottom three/two ==
Episode	Contestants			Eliminated
1	Nadia, Francine, & Nicole			Nadia
2	Nicole, Francine, & Jasmine			Francine
3	Sharin, Irish, & Kea			Irish
4	Kea, Sharin, & Rafaella			Kea
5	Sharin, Jasmine, & Nicole			Nicole
6	Victoria, Jasmine, & Shi			Jasmine
7	Sharin, Victoria, & Shi			Sharin
8	Victoria	&	Gabriela	None
9	Victoria	&	Shi	Shi
10	Gabriela, Alexandria, & Victoria			Victoria
12	Rafaella, Alexandria, & Gabriela			Rafaella
12	Alexandria	&	Gabriela	Gabriela

The contestant was eliminated after their first time in the bottom two/three
The contestant was eliminated after their second time in the bottom two/three
The contestant was eliminated after their third time in the bottom two/three
The contestant was eliminated after their fourth time in the bottom two/three
The contestant was eliminated after their fifth time in the bottom two/three
The contestant was eliminated in the first round of elimination and placed third
The contestant was eliminated and placed as the runner-up
