= Cambodia's Next Top Model season 1 =

Cambodia's Next Top Model
- Season 1
- No. of episodes: 16

Release
- Original network: MYTV
- Original release: November 14, 2014 – March 27, 2015

Cambodia's Next Top Model, Season 1 is the first installment of an upcoming reality television show hosted by Yok Chenda in which a number of women compete for the title of Cambodia's Next Top Model along with the chance to begin their career in the modeling industry. The other three judges are Kouy Chandanich, Remy Hou, and Chem Vuth Sovin.

The show's first season included 50 semi-finalists, which were revealed on a weekly basis in clusters of five on the show's official Facebook page. The same was done for the revealing of the top 35. Fifteen finalists were selected to move on to the main competition.

Casting calls and auditions were held in Cambodia from May through June 2014. Contestants were required to be between the ages of 18 and 27, and meet a minimum height requirement of 1.65 meters (5 ft 5 in, excluding the Maltese adaptation of the Top Model franchise, this is the lowest height cut-off in any adaptation). The show began to air on November 14, 2014.

The winner of the competition was 22-year-old Chan Kong Kar from Banteay Meanchey. Apart from winning the title of Cambodia's Next Top Model, she will receive; a talent contract with MYTV, a cash prize of $10,000, the opportunity to appear on the cover of Sovrin Magazine in Cambodia, and a one year membership with The Place Gym in Phnom Penh.

== Contestants ==
(ages stated are at start of contest)

Contestant	Age	Height	Hometown	Finish	Place
Pheng Sombath Meas	19	1.65 m (5 ft 5 in)	Phnom Penh	Episode 1	18 (quit)
Veun Ostin	19	1.67 m (5 ft 5 1/2 in)	Phnom Penh	Episode 2	17–16 (quit)
Heang Sreypov	27	1.75 m (5 ft 9 in)	Phnom Penh	Episode 2	17–16 (quit)
Kheang Kanika	22	1.67 m (5 ft 5 1/2 in)	Phnom Penh	Episode 2	15
Suon Daroth	23	1.65 m (5 ft 5 in)	Siem Reap	Episode 3	14
Trinh Phalla	26	1.65 m (5 ft 5 in)	Phnom Penh	Episode 4	13 (quit)
Peng Thida	24	1.72 m (5 ft 7 1/2 in)	Pailin	Episode 5	12
Tang Sovannak Phoung	27	1.65 m (5 ft 5 in)	Senmonorom	Episode 6	11
Kim Karona	19	1.66 m (5 ft 5 1/2 in)	Sihanoukville	Episode 7	10
Prem Prey Sovothana	22	1.76 m (5 ft 9 1/2 in)	Takéo	Episode 8	9
Srun Kunthy	20	1.66 m (5 ft 5 1/2 in)	Phnom Penh	Episode 9	8
Moun Mich Samnang	18	1.69 m (5 ft 6 1/2 in)	Pursat	Episode 10	7
Moeung Sopheak	22	1.65 m (5 ft 5 in)	Phnom Penh	Episode 12	6
Nin Malyneth	21	1.72 m (5 ft 7 1/2 in)	Phnom Penh	Episode 13	5
Hang Soriyan	21	1.65 m (5 ft 5 in)	Phnom Penh	Episode 14	4
Lun Bodalis	23	1.65 m (5 ft 5 in)	Koh Kong	Episode 17	3
Ke Chankesey	25	1.68 m (5 ft 6 in)	Kampong Thom	Episode 17	2
Chan Kong Kar	22	1.69 m (5 ft 6 1/2 in)	Banteay Meanchey	Episode 17	1

== Episodes ==
=== Episode 1 ===
Original Airdate: November 14, 2014

Casting episode.

- Quit: Pheng Sombath Meas
- Featured photographer: Cheky Athiporn

=== Episode 2 ===
Original Airdate: November 28, 2014

- Quit: Heang Sreypov & Veun Ostin
- Entered: Tang Sovannak Phoung & Trinh Phalla
- First call-out: Moun Mich Samnang
- Bottom two: Kheang Kanika & Prem Prey Sovothana
- Eliminated: Kheang Kanika
- Featured photographer: Jack Malipan

=== Episode 3 ===
Original Airdate: December 5, 2014

- First call-out: Meung Sopheak
- Bottom two: Peng Thida & Suon Daroth
- Eliminated: Suon Daroth
- Featured photographer: Alex Tee

=== Episode 4 ===
Original Airdate: December 12, 2014

- First call-out: Ke Chankesey
- Quit: Trinh Phalla
- Bottom two: Nin Malyneth & Peng Thida
- Originally eliminated: Peng Thida

=== Episode 5 ===
Original Airdate: December 19, 2014

- First call-out: Chan Kong Kar
- Bottom two: Peng Thida & Prem Prey Sovothana
- Eliminated: Peng Thida
- Featured photographer: Cheky Athiporn

=== Episode 6 ===
Original Airdate: December 26, 2014

- First call-out: Ke Chankesey
- Bottom two: Kim Karona & Tang Sovannak Phoung
- Eliminated: Tang Sovannak Phoung
- Featured photographer: Alex Tee

=== Episode 7 ===
Original Airdate: January 2, 2015

- First call-out: Hang Soriyan
- Bottom two: Kim Karona & Meung Sopheak
- Eliminated: Kim Karona
- Featured photographer: Mars Mario

=== Episode 8 ===
Original Airdate: January 9, 2015

- First call-out: Lun Bodalis
- Bottom two: Chan Kong Kar & Prem Prey Sovothana
- Eliminated: Prem Prey Sovothana
- Featured photographer: Balazs Maar

=== Episode 9 ===
Original Airdate: January 16, 2015

- First call-out: Lun Bodalis
- Bottom two: Nin Malyneth & Srun Kunthy
- Eliminated: Srun Kunthy
- Featured photographer: Natacha Van

=== Episode 10 ===
Original Airdate: January 23, 2015

- First call-out: Hang Soriyan
- Bottom two: Meung Sopheak & Moun Mich Samnang
- Eliminated: Moun Mich Samnang
- Featured photographer: Natacha Van

=== Episode 11 ===
Original Airdate: January 30, 2015

- First call-out: Chan Kong Kar
- Bottom two: Lun Bodalis & Nin Malyneth
- Eliminated: None

=== Episode 12 ===
Original Airdate: February 6, 2015

- First call-out: Chan Kong Kar
- Bottom two: Moeung Sopheak & Nin Malyneth
- Eliminated: Moeung Sopheak

=== Episode 13 ===
Original Airdate: February 13, 2015

- First call-out: Chan Kong Kar
- Bottom two: Lun Bodalis & Nin Malyneth
- Eliminated: Nin Malyneth
- Featured photographer: Chem Vuth Sovin

=== Episode 14 ===
Original Airdate: February 20, 2015

- First call-out: Chan Kong Kar
- Bottom two: Lun Bodalis & Hang Soriyan
- Eliminated: Hang Soriyan

=== Episode 15 ===
Original Airdate: February 27, 2015

Recap episode.

=== Episode 16 ===
Original Airdate: March 6, 2015

Interview to look back to the journey of the final three contestants.

=== Episode 17 ===
Original Airdate: March 27, 2015

- Eliminated: Lun Bodalis
- Final two: Chan Kong Kar & Ke Chankesey
- Cambodia's Next Top Model: Chan Kong Kar

== Summaries ==
=== Call-out order ===
Order	Episodes														
Order	1	2	3	4	5	6	7	8	9	10	11	12	13	14	17
1	Kunthy	Samnang	Sopheak	Chankesey	Kong Kar	Chankesey	Soriyan	Bodalis	Bodalis	Soriyan	Kong Kar	Kong Kar	Kong Kar	Kong Kar	Kong Kar
2	Sovothana	Soriyan	Malyneth	Phalla	Soriyan	Sopheak	Malyneth	Soriyan	Sopheak	Kong Kar	Chankesey	Bodalis	Chankesey	Chankesey	Chankesey
3	Thida	Kong Kar	Soriyan	Kong Kar	Sopheak	Soriyan	Bodalis	Chankesey	Soriyan	Bodalis	Sopheak	Soriyan	Soriyan	Bodalis	Bodalis
4	Daroth	Malyneth	Chankesey	Bodalis	Chankesey	Bodalis	Kong Kar	Kunthy	Chankesey	Chankesey	Soriyan	Chankesey	Bodalis	Soriyan	
5	Karona	Thida	Kunthy	Samnang	Kunthy	Kong Kar	Chankesey	Malyneth	Samnang	Malyneth	Bodalis; Malyneth	Malyneth	Malyneth		
6	Soriyan	Phalla	Samnang	Sopheak	Samnang	Samnang	Samnang	Sopheak	Kong Kar	Sopheak	Bodalis; Malyneth	Sopheak			
7	Ostin	Chankesey	Sovothana	Karona	Karona	Kunthy	Sovothana	Samnang	Malyneth	Samnang					
8	Bodalis	Kunthy	Bodalis	Soriyan	Malyneth	Malyneth	Kunthy	Kong Kar	Kunthy						
9	Sreypov	Sopheak	Phalla	Sovothana	Bodalis	Sovothana	Sopheak	Sovothana							
10	Malyneth	Bodalis	Kong Kar	Kunthy	Phoung	Karona	Karona								
11	Kanika	Karona	Phoung	Phoung	Sovothana	Phoung									
12	Meas	Daroth	Karona	Malyneth	Thida										
13	Chankesey	Phoung	Thida	Thida											
14	Samnang	Sovothana	Daroth												
15	Kong Kar	Kanika													
16	Sopheak	Ostin; Sreypov													
17		Ostin; Sreypov													

The contestant quit the competition.
The contestant was eliminated.
The contestant was the original eliminee but was saved.
The contestant was part of a non-elimination bottom two.
The contestant won the competition.

- Episode 1 began with 50 contestants. The first preliminary photo shoot determined the top 35 semi-finalists. An interview with the judges saw another 13 girls eliminated. A final photo shoot was used to narrow the pool of 22 to the final 15 contestants. Meas was originally chosen to be a part of the top fifteen, but decided to quit after the finalists had been selected. Due to the number opening, Sopheak was allowed to enter the competition.
- In episode 2, Ostin and Sreypov quit the competition. Phalla and Phoung were brought in as their replacements.
- In episode 4, Phalla quit the competition. As a result, Thida was allowed to remain in the competition.
- In episode 11 Bodalis and Malyneth landed in the bottom two. Neither of them was eliminated.
- Episode 15 was the recap episode.
- Episode 16 was the interview special featuring the contestants who participated during the season. Daroth, Phalla and Karona decided not to take part in this episode.

=== Photo shoot guide ===
- Episode 1 photo shoot: Modeling Levi's jeans in B&W
- Episode 2 photo shoot: Floating in a pool of flowers
- Episode 3 photo shoot: Jewelry beauty shots with tarantulas and lizards
- Episode 4 photo shoot: Motorcycles on a railroad track
- Episode 5 photo shoot: Adidas boxing advertisements
- Episode 6 photo shoot: Movement on a trampoline
- Episode 7 photo shoot: Fairy tale couture
- Episode 8 photo shoot: Covered in paint
- Episode 9 photo shoot: Lost in an island with a male model
- Episode 10 photo shoot: Lighting candles in a canoe
- Episode 11 photo shoot: Pedro handbags over the Cambodian skyline
- Episode 12 commercial: Natural republic creamy lipstick
- Episode 13 photo shoot: Portraying film actresses
- Episode 14 photo shoot: Cambodian goddesses
- Episode 17 photo shoots: Sovrin magazine covers; posing live onstage

== Judges ==
- Yok Chenda (Host)
- Kouy Chandanich (Model)
- Remy Hou (Designer)
- Chem Vuth Sovin (Photographer)
