= Hutagalung =

Batak surname originating in Indonesia

Hutagulung is one of Toba Batak clans originating in North Sumatra, Indonesia. People of this clan bear the clan's name as their surname. Notable people of this clan include:

- Jesse Hutagalung (born 1985), Dutch-Indonesian professional tennis player
- Nadya Hutagalung (born 1974), Indonesian-Australian model, actress, and presenter
