= Supermodel Me season 6 =

Supermodel Me
- Season 6
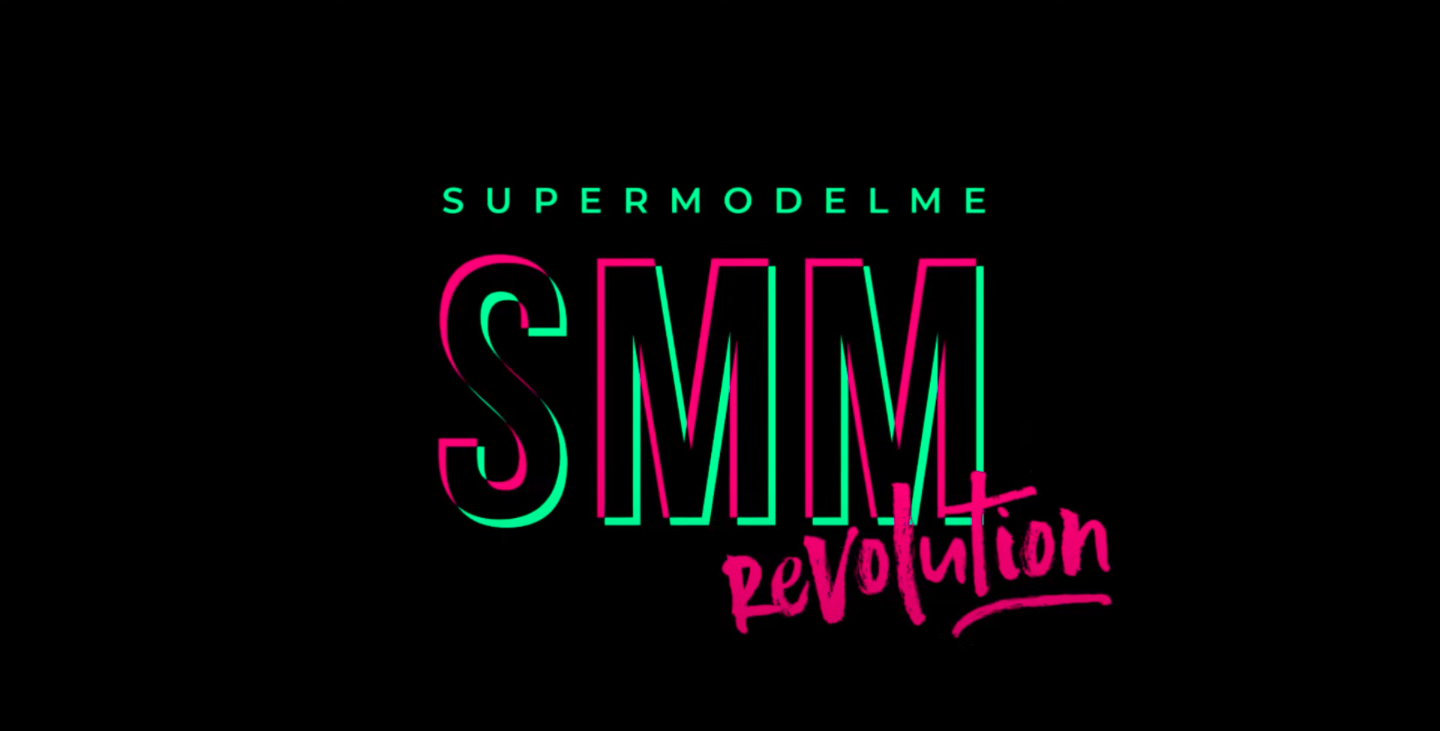
- Judges: Cindy Bishop; Yu Tsai; Ase Wang; Catriona Gray
- No. of contestants: 12
- Winner: Nguyễn Quỳnh Anh
- No. of episodes: 10

Release
- Original network: AXN Asia, iQiyi
- Original release: 11 October – 13 December 2021

Season chronology
- ← Previous; Season 5 Next → Season 7

The sixth season of Supermodel Me (or Supermodel Me: Revolution) aired on 11 October 2021 after a 7-year hiatus, with the shooting location being moved back to Singapore. The previous judging panel were mostly replaced by the judging panel of Asia's Next Top Model, with Thai model Cindy Bishop appointed as the host and head judge, and Yu Tsai appointed as the creative consultant. Ase Wang returned to the judging panel for the fourth time. The show marked as the debut of Hanli Hoefer and Catriona Gray (finale episode) in the show's judging panel. Asia's Next Top Model alumni Dana Slosar and Monika Santa Maria were added as the task master.

This season features 12 contestants; three from the Philippines, two each from Singapore and Vietnam, and one each from China, Hong Kong, Indonesia, Malaysia and Thailand.

The prizes for this season are: a new Subaru car with the chance to become the brand's ambassador, a cover on Harper’s Bazaar and a modelling contract with Storm Model Management.

The winner was 21-year-old Quỳnh Anh Nguyễn from Vietnam.

This season is available to watch through streaming platform Netflix from December 2, 2022.

This season won Best Editing at the Asian Academy Creative Awards 2022 on December 7, 2022.

== Contestants ==
(Ages stated are at time of contest)

Country	Contestant	Age	Hometown	Finish	Place
Singapore	Claire Lee	21	1.75 m (5 ft 9 in)	Episode 1	12
Philippines	Cassandra Laforteza	25	1.78 m (5 ft 10 in)	Episode 2	11
Vietnam	Wiwi Nguyễn	24	1.70 m (5 ft 7 in)	Episode 3	10
Thailand	Jennifer Fredin	20	1.70 m (5 ft 7 in)	Episode 4	9
Malaysia	Prisca Klose	24	1.73 m (5 ft 8 in)	Episode 5	8
Philippines	Melanie Jane Fernandez	21	1.72 m (5 ft 7 1/2 in)	Episode 6	7
Hong Kong	Tiffany Jane 'TJ' Bennett	24	1.70 m (5 ft 7 in)	Episode 7	6
China	Isabelle Zhang	19	1.75 m (5 ft 9 in)	Episode 8	5
Indonesia	Zeline Prabowo	26	1.77 m (5 ft 9 1/2 in)	Episode 9	4
Singapore	Hannah Cheng-Bradshaw	21	1.73 m (5 ft 8 in)	Episode 10	3
Philippines	Nikki Advincula de Moura	17	1.68 m (5 ft 6 in)	Episode 10	2
Vietnam	Nguyễn Quỳnh Anh	21	1.73 m (5 ft 8 in)	Episode 10	1

== Results ==
=== Call-out order ===
Order	Episodes									
Order	1	2	3	4	5	6	7	8	9	10
1	Quỳnh Anh	Hannah	Jennifer	Nikki	Quỳnh Anh	Zeline	Zeline	Nikki	Hannah	Quỳnh Anh
2	TJ	Nikki	Isabelle	Melanie	Isabelle	Hannah	Quỳnh Anh	Hannah	Quỳnh Anh	Nikki
3	Jennifer	TJ	Melanie	Hannah	TJ	Nikki	Hannah	Zeline	Nikki	Hannah
4	Nikki	Zeline	Zeline	Isabelle	Nikki	Isabelle	Nikki	Quỳnh Anh	Zeline	
5	Prisca	Prisca	Quỳnh Anh	TJ	Zeline	Quỳnh Anh	Isabelle	Isabelle		
6	Zeline	Quỳnh Anh	Nikki	Prisca	Hannah	TJ	TJ			
7	Wiwi	Jennifer	Hannah	Quỳnh Anh	Melanie	Melanie				
8	Hannah	Melanie	Prisca	Zeline	Prisca					
9	Isabelle	Isabelle	TJ	Jennifer						
10	Melanie	Wiwi	Wiwi							
11	Cassandra	Cassandra								
12	Claire									

The contestant won the task-challenge
The contestant was eliminated
The contestant won the task-challenge and was eliminated
The contestant won the competition

=== Photo shoot guide ===
- Episode 1 photoshoot: Survival of The Fiercest: Fly Fearless with La Perla Lingerie
- Episode 2 photoshoot: Time to Transform: Sugar & Spice Inside Singapore's First Museum of Ice cream
- Episode 3 photoshoot: Raising The Heat: Get Wet & Wild on Sentosa Infinity Pool
- Episode 4 photoshoot: Fast Forward: Supreme Machine with Subaru Forester
- Episode 5 photoshoot: Total Knock Out: Steal The Chinese Opera Show
- Episode 6 photoshoot: Beast Unleashed: Delicate Bare Beauty in The Wetland Pond
- Episode 7 photoshoot: Rule The World: Roll Striking with Finest Handcrafted KrisShop Collection
- Episode 8 photoshoot: Be The Fantasy: Fairy Muse Out of The Woodland
- Episode 9 photoshoot: The Fast Lane: Light, Camera & Action with Subaru Outback
- Episode 10 photoshoot: Final Showdown: Flaunt The Shifty Look of Disco Generation

=== Average call-out order ===
Rank by average	Place	Model	Call-out total	Number of call-outs	Call-out average
1	2	Nikki	30	10	3.00
2	1	Quỳnh Anh	34	10	3.40
3	3	Hannah	36	10	3.60
4	4	Zeline	36	9	4.00
5	6	TJ	34	7	4.86
6-7	5	Isabelle	40	8	5.00
6-7	9	Jennifer	20	4	5.00
8	7	Melanie	37	6	6.17
9	8	Prisca	32	5	6.40
10	10	Wiwi	27	3	9.00
11	11	Cassandra	22	2	11.00
12	12	Claire	12	1	12.00

== Bottom three/two ==
Episode	Bottom three/two Contestants			Eliminated
1	Cassandra	Claire	Melanie	Claire
2	Isabelle	Wiwi	Cassandra	Cassandra
3	Wiwi	TJ	Prisca	Wiwi
4	Quỳnh Anh	Jennifer	Zeline	Jennifer
5	Hannah	Prisca	Melanie	Prisca
6	Quỳnh Anh	TJ	Melanie	Melanie
7	Isabelle	&	TJ	TJ
8	Isabelle	&	Quỳnh Anh	Isabelle
9	Nikki	&	Zeline	Zeline
10	Quỳnh Anh	Hannah	Nikki	Hannah
10	Quỳnh Anh	&	Nikki	Nikki

The contestant was eliminated after their first time in the bottom two/three
The contestant was eliminated after their second time in the bottom two/three
The contestant was eliminated after their third time in the bottom two/three
The contestant was eliminated in the first round of elimination and placed third
The contestant was eliminated and placed as the runner-up
