= The Fast and the Furious (disambiguation) =

Fast & Furious is a media franchise centered on a series of action films.

The Fast and the Furious, Fast and Furious, and their variations, may also refer to:

== Older films ==
- Fast and Furious (1927 film), a silent film directed by Melville W. Brown
- Fast and Furious (1939 film), a film directed by Busby Berkeley
- The Fast and the Furious (1954 film), an American crime drama

== Fast & Furious franchise ==
- The Fast and the Furious (2001 film), the first film in the series
  - The Fast and the Furious (soundtrack), the soundtrack to the 2001 film
  - The Fast and the Furious (2004 video game), a video game based on the 2001 film
- The Fast and the Furious (2006 video game), a video game based on The Fast and the Furious: Tokyo Drift
- Fast & Furious (2009 film), the fourth film in the series
  - Fast & Furious (soundtrack), the soundtrack to the 2009 film
  - Fast & Furious (score), the movie score soundtrack to the 2009 film

== Television ==
- Fast and Furry-ous, a 1949 Warner Bros. Looney Tunes cartoon and the debut appearance of Wile E. Coyote and the Road Runner
- "The Furious and the Fast", the seventh episode in the second season of the 2012 television series Dallas
- "The Fast and the Furious", a two-part episode airing in the third season of the 1981 television series B. J. and the Bear
- Supermodel Me: Fast & Furious, the third season of the Asian television series Supermodel Me

== Other uses ==
- Operation Fast and Furious, a "gunwalking" operation by the Phoenix division of the United States Bureau of Alcohol, Tobacco, Firearms and Explosives

== See also ==
- Tom and Jerry: The Fast and the Furry, a 2005 animated film
