= Supermodel Me season 7 =

2026 season of a television series

Supermodel Me
- Season 7
- Judges: Cindy Bishop; Patricia Gouw; Ase Wang
- No. of contestants: 10
- Winner: Habie Mondido
- No. of episodes: 50

Release
- Original network: FlareFlow; TikTok
- Original release: 18 August 2026

Season chronology
- ← Previous; Season 6

The seventh season of Supermodel Me (or Supermodel Me: Make It or Break It) was released on 18 August 2026 through FlareFlow and TikTok, marking the show's return after a five-year hiatus, with production based in Singapore. It was also the first season to be filmed and released in a digital, vertical format. Thai model Cindy Bishop returned as host and head judge for a second consecutive season. Ase Wang returned to the judging panel for the fifth time. The show marked as the debut of Indonesian model Patricia Gouw in the show's judging panel.

The season featured ten contestants: three from the Philippines, two each from Indonesia and Singapore, and one each from South Korea, Thailand, and Vietnam. The season ran for 50 episodes, with two models eliminated after every 10 episodes.

The prizes for this season are: a modelling contract with Basic Models Management in Singapore and will start in an micro-drama on Flareflow.

The winner was 19-year-old Habie Mondido from the Philippines, with Dabi Lee of South Korea finishing as the runner-up.

== Contestants ==
(Ages stated are at time of contest)

Country	Contestant	Age	Height	Finish	Place
Singapore	Ashley Soo	26	1.78 m (5 ft 10 in)	Episode 10	10–9
Indonesia	Ketty Chang	30	1.73 m (5 ft 8 in)	Episode 10	10–9
Singapore	Juhi Nar Singh	28	1.68 m (5 ft 6 in)	Episode 20	8–7
Thailand	Moonique Larsen	29	1.75 m (5 ft 9 in)	Episode 20	8–7
Vietnam	Mint Ngô	31	1.74 m (5 ft 8 1/2 in)	Episode 30	6–5
Philippines	Tatyana Alexi Austria	23	1.75 m (5 ft 9 in)	Episode 30	6–5
Philippines	Cathrina Torres	29	1.69 m (5 ft 6 1/2 in)	Episode 40	4–3
Indonesia	Nara Rahayu	30	1.75 m (5 ft 9 in)	Episode 40	4–3
South Korea	Jisoo 'Dabi' Lee	25	1.72 m (5 ft 7 1/2 in)	Episode 50	2
Philippines	Habie Mondido	19	1.74 m (5 ft 8 1/2 in)	Episode 50	1

== Results ==
=== Call-out order ===
Order	Episodes				
Order	10 (Note: Immediately after Ashley and Ketty's elimination, Juhi entered the competition.)	20 (Note: Immediately after Juhi and Moonique's elimination, Nara entered the competition.)	30	40	50 (Note: The winner of the season was determined by the votes of the eight eliminated models and three panelists.)
1	Habie	Habie	Nara	Dabi	Habie
2	Dabi	Mint	Dabi	Habie	Dabi
3	Moonique	Cathrina	Cathrina	Cathrina; Nara	
4	Tatyana	Dabi	Habie	Cathrina; Nara	
5	Cathrina	Tatyana	Mint; Tatyana		
6	Mint	Juhi; Moonique	Mint; Tatyana		
7	Ashley; Ketty	Juhi; Moonique			
8	Ashley; Ketty				

The contestant was eliminated
The contestant won the competition

=== Photo shoot guide ===
- Episodes 1-10 photoshoot: Bodysuit Promotion
- Episodes 11-20 photoshoot: Emotion Roulette
- Episodes 21-30 photoshoot: Urban Velocity
- Episodes 31-40 photoshoot: The Heatwave
- Episodes 41-50 photoshoot: Two Worlds
