= Ayu Gani =

Indonesian model

- Born: Ayu Lestari Putri Gani; 13 August 1991 (age 35); Nganjuk, East Java, Indonesia
- Occupation: Model
- Years active: 2011–present
- Modeling information
- Height: 173 cm (5 ft 8 in)
- Hair color: Black
- Eye color: Brown

Ayu Lestari Putri Gani (born 13 August 1991) is an Indonesian fashion model. She is best known for winning the third cycle of Asia's Next Top Model and became the first Indonesian to win the show.

== Early life ==
Gani was born to ethnic Chinese parents in Nganjuk in East Java, Indonesia, before she moved to Yogyakarta. She studied at Sanata Dharma University majoring in English literature, and received a scholarship from Cincinnati, Ohio, for one year because of her talent in music. After that, she finally moved back to Jakarta and is now studying fashion business at LaSalle College Jakarta.

== Pre-show career ==
Gani began her career when she joined a modelling competition called "Wajah Femina", where she was awarded "The Most Favorite" title. After that, she walked in several fashion shows around Indonesia and became the icon of Jakarta Fashion Week 2012. She has also been featured in numerous magazine covers, spreads, and interviews like Surface Magazine, Femina Indonesia, Grazia, Nylon, HighEnd, and Harper's Bazaar Singapore as the winner of Asia's Next Top Model (season 3). She has also modeled for Zalora.

== Asia's Next Top Model ==
Gani was one of the fourteen contestants on the third season of Asia's Next Top Model. She was one of three contestants representing Indonesia, the others being Tahlia Raji and Rani Ramadhany. She received three best photo or first call-outs in weeks 2, 6 and 12 – the second highest number after Monika Sta. Maria with four. She won the competition against Sta. Maria and Aimee Cheng-Bradshaw, winning a Subaru XV STI, a cover of Harper's Bazaar Singapore, a contract Storm Model Management in London and a campaign with TRESemmé.

== Post Asia's Next Top Model Career ==
Since Asia's Next Top Model, Gani has landed several jobs in Europe for commercial photo shoots and magazine spreads, as well as The Body Shop winter campaign. In 2017, she collaborated with Indonesian fashion brand Minimal. In 2021, she appeared in reality competition show Indonesia's Next Top Model, where she became a judge for two cycles.

Awards and achievements
Preceded by (Malaysia) Sheena Liam	Asia's Next Top Model; 2015 (season 3)	Succeeded by (Thailand) Tawan Kedkong
