= Cambodia's Next Top Model =

- Created by: Tyra Banks
- Presented by: Yan Linda (2-); Yok Chenda (1)
- Judges: Kouy Chandanich; Chem Vuth Sovin; Remy Hou
- Opening theme: Wanna be on top?
- Country of origin: Cambodia
- No. of episodes: 17

Production
- Running time: 60 minutes

Original release
- Network: MYTV
- Release: November 14, 2014 – present

Cambodia's Next Top Model (Khmer: កំពូលតារាបង្ហាញម៉ូដកម្ពុជា)(Cambodia'sNTM or CamNTM) is a Cambodian reality TV series, based on Tyra Banks' America's Next Top Model.

The show is produced by Cambodian television channel MYTV and CTN. Casting calls for the show began during early April and ended on May 31, 2014. The judges for the show have been revealed to be Cambodian model Kouy Chandanich, fashion photographer Chem Vuth Sovin, Cambodian-American fashion designer Remy Hou, and Cambodian TV presenter Yok Chenda. Chenda serves the role of Tyra Banks as head judge and host of the show. The semi-finalists chosen to compete for season one were revealed on the show's official Facebook page.

== Seasons ==
Season	Premiere date	Winner	Runner-up	Other contestants in order of elimination	Number of contestants
1	14 November 2014	Chan Kong Kar	Ke Chankesey	Pheng Sombath Meas (quit), Heang Sreypov (quit) & Veun Ostin (quit), Kheang Kanika, Suon Daroth, Trinh Phalla (quit), Peng Thida, Tang Sovannak Phuong, Kim Karona, Prem Prey Sovothana, Srun Kunthy, Moun Mich Samnang, Meung Sopheak, Nin Malyneth, Hang Soriyan, Lun Bodalis	18
