= E! (Asian TV channel) =

- Country: Singapore
- Broadcast area: Southeast Asia
- Network: NBCUniversal International Networks
- Affiliates: Diva
- Headquarters: Marina Bay Sands, 10 Bayfront Avenue, Marina Bay, Downtown Core, Singapore

Programming
- Picture format: 1080i HDTV (16:9)

Ownership
- Owner: NBCUniversal
- Sister channels: CNBC Asia; Diva

History
- Launched: 30 November 1997; 28 years ago (as entertainment pay television channel)
- Closed: 1 January 2020; 6 years ago

Links
- Website: Official website

E! was a high-definition entertainment channel, owned by NBCUniversal International Networks. It was officially launched in Asia on 30 November 1997 with Hallmark Channel Asia, later known as Diva. For the most part outside of a few local programmes, it mainly carried programmes from the American E! network with dubbing or subtitling where appropriate.

== History ==
E! Asia was officially launched on 30 November 1997 as Singaporean 24-hour English pay television channel. It was broadcast from Singapore and aired throughout Southeast Asia.

E! Asia's production facilities were located in Singapore. Among the popular reality shows included Keeping Up with the Kardashians.

On 28 January 2015, the HD version of E! was launched.

=== Closure ===
As part of a restructuring at NBCUniversal International Networks and the launch of Hayu in Asia, E! Entertainment Television along with its sister channel Diva officially ceased broadcasting on 1 January 2020 at midnight. All selected E! shows were moved to CNBC Asia.

== Former original programming ==
In December 2014, the channel launched its first local Malaysian miniseries Facing Up to Fazura. E! Asia also produced E! News Asia Specials, focusing profiles of national celebrities such as Aaron Aziz, Anne Curtis, Jay Park, and Lisa Surihani.

== Final programming ==
- Keeping Up with the Kardashians
- Revenge Body with Khloé Kardashian
