= Supermodel Me season 1 =

Supermodel Me
- Season 1
- Judges: Charmaine Harn; Geoff Ang; Jeanette Ejlersen; Olivier Henry; Grace Lee
- No. of contestants: 10
- Winner: Evelyn Alice Lee-Ann Leckie
- No. of episodes: 10

Release
- Original network: AXN Asia
- Original release: 16 June – 18 August 2009

Season chronology
- Next → Season 2

The first season of Supermodel Me aired in 2009, with the shooting location in Singapore.

The judging panel this season include Charmaine Harn, Geoff Ang, Jeanette Ejlersen, Olivier Henry and Grace Lee. Special appearances for the show included: Andrew Tan, Elaine Daly, David Gan, Frederick Lee, Marcus A. C, Lee Zhaun, Patrick Sin, Rizal Ahyar, Rick Tan, Furqan Saini, and more.

This season will feature 10 contestants; three from Australia, two each from Malaysia and Singapore, and one each from South Korea, Thailand and The United States.

The prizes for this cycle were a cash prize of 10,000S$ value FEVO Mastercard, a cover shoot with JetStar Asia inflight magazine, four days three nights stay at Somerset Azabu East in Tokyo, an Acer F900 Windows Mobile Phone, a Redken & M.A.C. hampers and a modelling contract with Diva Models.

The winner was 17-year-old Evelyn Alice Lee-Ann Leckie from Australia.

== Contestants ==
(Ages stated are at time of contest)

Country	Contestant	Age	Height	Finish	Place
Australia	Helen Mary Swale	22	1.78 m (5 ft 10 in)	Episode 2	10
Singapore	Emilia Soh Ling Hui	20	1.78 m (5 ft 10 in)	Episode 3	9
Malaysia	Yuen Sze Jia	22	1.80 m (5 ft 11 in)	Episode 4	8
United States	Ciara Roxanne Schmalfeld	22	1.73 m (5 ft 8 in)	Episode 5	7
South Korea	Jenny Susanne Fuglsang	20	1.77 m (5 ft 9 1/2 in)	Episode 6	6
Australia	Fiona Melissa Thomas	23	1.73 m (5 ft 8 in)	Episode 7	5
Malaysia	Anna Syuhada	22	1.75 m (5 ft 9 in)	Episode 8	4
Thailand	Kathlene Orasa McKinney	17	1.71 m (5 ft 7 1/2 in)	Episode 10	3
Singapore	Christabel Campbell	21	1.78 m (5 ft 10 in)	Episode 10	2
Australia	Evelyn Alice Lee-Ann Leckie	17	1.80 m (5 ft 11 in)	Episode 10	1

== Episodes ==
No. overall	No. in season	Title	Original release date
1	1	"Episode 1"	16 June 2009
10 girls from all over Asia had arrived in Singapore for the competition. Host Charmaine meets them outside the house they’ll be staying in and tells them about the bed situation. The girls race in to get first pick of their beds. Next, the girls head to The Red Dot Design Museum where Rick Tan, model-turned-host and the catwalk expert, teaches them different styles of walking before having a catwalk challenge, which Yuen won and receive a pair of high heels. Back at the house, Charmaine came to tell the rules and they have one last call to their loved one. The models are tested on their courage and confidence in showing off their catwalk and posing skills, but will takes place in front of a very public audience in Orchard Road. They have to time their pace according to the lights at the pedestrian crossing and still be able to strike a pose. At the first elimination, Christabel won the best performance and receive 10-extra-shot in the next photoshoot. And in the end, Charmaine decided that no one will be eliminated.: Featured photographers: Invy Ng; Special guests: Rick Tan
2	2	"Episode 2"	23 June 2009
The 10 models head to Toni & Guy Hair Studio and have their makeover by stylish Roy Sng and Marcus AC, who decide what new haircuts the girls should get. After that, Marcus met the girls back to the model's house and are put to the test by styling themselves using TopShop clothes and M.A.C. cosmetics based on their new look while only have 5 minutes. Fiona won the challenge and won a 500$ worth of M.A.C. cosmetics. The models head to GeoffStudio for a Her World magazine cover photoshoot, where they learn not all shoots take place in spacious conditions. The models have to pose in a tiny photo booth where tight, close-up shots are taken for the Cover Challenge and they got their hair styled by well-known celebrity stylist David Gan. At the elimination, Jenny won the best performance and will be on the cover for Her World online. And in the end, Helen is the first girl to be eliminated.: Featured photographers: Geoff Ang; Special guests: Marcus AC, Roy Sng, David Gan
3	3	"Episode 3"	30 June 2009
9 remained girls have a morning stint on an inverted bungee ride. With their nerves still ajitter, they head to Jitterbugs dance studio for a dance lesson with show choreographer Misha Hajab. After learning some dance moves, the girls are split into 3 teams for a challenge to choreograph their own creative ending to a song. Anna, Fiona & Jenny won the challenge and won a spa package. The models head to GeoffStudio for the next photoshoot. This time, fashion choreographer Rizal Ahyar styles the girls and colorful scarves are tied to their wrists for dramatic effect. Here’s where their experience on the inverted bungee and dance class come to play as they try to strike graceful poses and maintaining control of their facial expressions as they will pose while jumping on the trampoline. At the elimination, Yuen won the best performance and Emilia is the next girl to be eliminated.: Featured photographers: Jeremiah Ang; Special guests: Misha Hajab, Rizal Ahyar, Lee Zhuan
4	4	"Episode 4"	7 July 2009
The 8 girls head to Honey Pot Waxing Boutique for their Brazilian waxes and then on to bikini shopping at Rip Curl, Paragon with model Elaine Daly. After that, the girls and Elaine hang out by the pool where she gets to know them a bit better. The girls went to Olivier Henry’s studio to have their next photoshoot inspired by the movie Stockholm Syndrome, where they have to reenact a kidnapping scenario. Wearing just a bikini, the girls have to play hostages while their captors in clown masks are terrorizing them and dragging them into a giant container. Their goal is to look sexy while striking adventurous poses and experimenting with their body movements. At the elimination, Fiona won the best performance and to everyone's shock, Yuen is the next girl to be eliminated despite having a best performance last time.: Featured photographers: Olivier Henry; Special guests: Elaine Daly
5	5	"Episode 5"	14 July 2009
7 remained girls arrived at The Red Dot Design Museum, where they meet actress Irene Ang and she teaches them how to act. The girls are assigned to act like animals and ‘interact’ with one another through animal actions and sounds. After which, the girls are given some props and they must ‘sell’ these products according to specific themes i.e. sexy, hip-hop, sign language, etc. Later, the girls are then split into 3 teams and given revised movie scenarios for an act-out challenge. Lead to the result in Christabel, Jenny & Kathleen won the challenge as the group with Anna also won as individual, and they will get a shopping spree at River Island, VivoCity. The girls arrived at Milk Photography for a close-up beauty shoot with Olivier Henry. They have to wear minimal makeup as they will be captured in their natural state. Instead of the usual fashion poses, the girls to use their facial expressions to express their inner emotions while sit in a small booth with natural lighting from the window. At the elimination, Kathleen won the best performance and Ciara is the next girl to be eliminated.: Featured photographers: Olivier Henry; Special guests: Irene Ang
6	6	"Episode 6"	21 July 2009
6 girls are facing their fearness as they have to reach inside a glass tank fill with hundred of worms to get an envelopes which one of them contain a Supermodelme word, and Anna got that one so she will get an advantage in the next challenge. Later, the girls went to Forest Adventure for an obstacle-course challenge and Anna won the challenge for being the fastest girls to conquer the course. As a result, she won a gift from Puma, plus she got to choose 4 more girls for a night-out and she choose Christabel, Evelyn, Fiona & Kathlene. The models head to a giant machinery warehouse at Kranji Road in blazing hot weather for their next photoshoot. They were styled by Furqan Saini in Max Studio dresses and have to pose on a cherry picker five metres off the ground. The models prove if they can overcome their fear of heights and impress the judges with their shots. At the elimination, Christabel won the best performance and Jenny is the next girl to be eliminated.: Featured photographers: Jingna Zhang; Special guests: Ziv Soon, Furqan Saini
7	7	"Episode 7"	28 July 2009
The 5 remaining models were taken to the Jurong Frog Farm and the girls’ dexterity are tested as they are required to pick up five live frogs and put them into a tank while being timed. Fiona won the challenge for being the fastest and receive a 300$ worth of Redken products, while Anna & Kathleen were unable to catch a frog will have to do the punishment is to clean the entire house. Afterwards, the girls are taken to Wild Wild Wet where they have fun with the water attractions. The models head to GeoffStudio for an underwater photoshoot, but they will have to hold a big squid and pose gracefully with it in the water. They are tested on how bold and professional they can be in front of the photographer. At the elimination, Christabel won the best performance and Jenny is the next girl to be eliminated.: Featured photographers: Geoff Ang; Special guests: Marcus AC
8	8	"Episode 8"	4 August 2009
The remaining four girls experience the Land ZOVB for the first time. In pairs, they dive into a giant bubble ball and roll down a hill. Thereafter, running like a hamster back up the hill. They then head home for a shower, get dressed and head out to Toca Me Bar for a karaoke challenge with model Rebecca Tan, which they to sing their heart out throughout the song. Kathllen won the challenge and won a 200$ worth of M.A.C. cosmetics. The girls later got to a workers’ dormitory and greeted by the unfamiliar sights, sounds and smells of the dormitory upon arrival. They then have their next photoshoot with a big group of curious and very friendly Bangladeshi workers and the concept of the shoot is the girls having fun with their friends, which is the Bangladeshi workers.: Featured photographers: Olivier Henry; Special guests: Rebecca Tan, Frederick Lee, Marcus AC, Patrick Sin
9	9	"Episode 9"	11 August 2009
The final three are pushed to the limits of their comfort zone in the boldest photoshoot ever, when they will be wearing nothing but the make-up done by renowned make-up artist, Clarence Lee, during the photoshoot. Later, the girls went on a go-see with designer from KOOPS, Keith Png. Afterward, the finalist are dressed in delicate and luxurious La Perla lingerie for their next photoshoot, but they will have to pose inside a -5 degree ice freezer at Tuck Lee ice works warehouse. The pressure is on, and the girls do their best to outshine one another. Later, the girls went on a go-see with Andrea Bonardi & Elvire Blasset from La Perla lingerie, which Christobelle got booked and will get to walk on their latest fashion show for La Perla.: Featured photographers: Geoff Ang, Olivier Henry; Special guests: Keith Png, Marcus AC, Andrea Bonardi, Elvire Blasset
10	10	"Episode 10"	18 August 2009
The final 3 have their next photoshoot in the 1920s concept in mind, Marcus styles and directs the models on set. It’s no easy shoot as this challenge is a first in the series. All three models are dressed in the same outfit and their challenge is to bring out the outfit in their own personal style. Moving from the past to the future, the second shoot is all about Avant Garde style. Later, with a circus set as their canvas, featuring a contortionist, a fire eater and a stilt walker, the models have to bring their individual essence to the second photoshoot. Posing in big voluminous dresses in such a demanding set is no easy task for our three finalists. Afterward. met all of the eliminated contestant for a dinner with Charmaine, where they have a talk about every moment of this competition. The next day, all 10 girls have a rehearsal with Rizal for the final showdown at Zouk club. At the final showdown, the 3 remaining girls have a final photoshoot in bikini with male models and a final runway. Final result, Evelyn became the first winner of Supermodel Me.: Special guests: Rebecca Tan, Rizal Ahyar, Rick Tan, Furqan Saini, Jingna Zhang

== Results table ==
Place	Episodes									
Place	1	2	3	4	5	6	7	8	9	10
1	**Christabel**	**Jenny**	**Yuen**	**Fiona**	**Kathlene**	Christabel	**Evelyn**	**Christabel**	**Christabel**	**Evelyn**
2	Emilia	**Evelyn**	**Fiona**	Ciara	Evelyn	Anna	Anna	Kathlene	Evelyn	**Christabel**
3	Evelyn	Fiona	Evelyn	Kathlene	Fiona	Kathlene	Kathlene	Evelyn	Kathlene	**Kathlene**
4	Jenny	Emilia	Jenny	Evelyn	Christabel	Evelyn	Christabel	**Anna**		
5	Fiona	Ciara	Anna	Jenny	Jenny	Fiona	**Fiona**			
6	Ciara	Anna	Christabel	Christabel	Anna	Jenny				
7	Helen	Christabel	Ciara	Anna	**Ciara**					
8	Yuen	Yuen	Kathlene	**Yuen**						
9	Anna	Kathlene	**Emilia**							
10	**Kathlene**	**Helen**								

The contestant won Supermodel Me.
The contestant was a runner-up.
The contestant was eliminated in the finale.
The contestant won the challenge.
The contestant received positive critiques and was ultimately declared safe.
The contestant received negative critiques but was ultimately declared safe.
The contestant was eliminated.

- In episode 1, no one was eliminated
- In episode 9, there is no elimination
- There are no call-out orders for the entire photo shoot from the beginning of the episode to the end, except for the model who gets the best photo and the model who is eliminated and if the host (Charmaine) tells a few call-out orders from each model.
- Model names in **bold** are official call-out orders from Supermodel Me, and model names that are not in bold are models for which there are no call-out orders (safe for surviving models) and there is no calculation of the performance of each model

=== Photo shoot guide ===
- Episode 1 photo shoot: Guerilla-style catwalk
- Episode 2 photo shoot: Her World magazine cover
- Episode 3 photo shoot: Trampoline shot
- Episode 4 photo shoot: Human trafficking
- Episode 5 photo shoot: B&W beauty shoot
- Episode 6 photo shoot: Posing at the construction
- Episode 7 photo shoot: Ploating in the water with squid
- Episode 8 photo shoot: Photoshoot with Bangladeshi workers
- Episode 9 photo shoots: B&W Nude; Lingerie in ice
- Episode 10 photo shoots: Vintage ladies; Circus; Bikini with male models
