= Asia's Next Top Model =

Reality television series

- Also known as: AsNTM
- Genre: Reality television
- Created by: Tyra Banks
- Based on: America's Next Top Model
- Presented by: Nadya Hutagalung; Georgina Wilson; Cindy Bishop
- Judges: Todd Anthony Tyler; Daniel Boey; Joey Mead King; Mike Rosenthal; Adam Williams; Alex Perry; Kelly Tandiono; Yu Tsai; Cara G. McIlroy
- Original language: English
- No. of seasons: 6
- No. of episodes: 75

Production
- Executive producers: Karen Seah; Mark Arbitrario; Sam Gollestani; Glenn Sims
- Running time: 43–45 minutes
- Production companies: Ice-TV (C1) activeTV (C2); Beach House Pictures (C3); FremantleMedia Asia (C4); Refinery Media (C5-6)

Original release
- Network: Star World (2012–2017); Fox Life (2018)
- Release: 25 November 2012 – 24 October 2018

Asia's Next Top Model (abbreviated as AsNTM) is a reality television show based on the American franchise America's Next Top Model in which a number of aspiring models compete for the title of Asia's Next Top Model and a chance to start their career in the modeling industry. The show features models from the entire Far East region (East Asia, South Asia, and Southeast Asia).

== Search for contestants ==
An extensive online search takes place for the selection process. Models of Asian descent or nationality are all allowed to apply, but they must be able to speak and write in English. All applicants are required to be at least 16 and no older than 27 years of age, and at least 5 ft 6 in (1.68 m) tall. Contestants who have previously participated in another Top Model franchise can still apply for the competition as long as they were not the winner, and are not currently under contractual obligations with an agency or endorsing any product or brand.

== Format ==
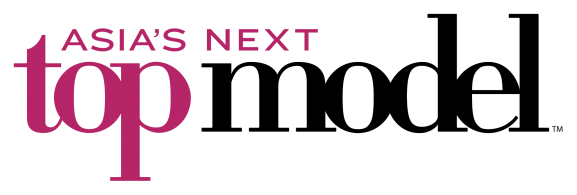
Show logo used from 2012–2017

Each cycle of Asia's Next Top Model has about 12-13 regular episodes, with a special recap episode which airs near the end of each cycle. Each cycle generally begins with about 14–16 contestants. Contestants are judged weekly on their overall appearance, participation in challenges, and their best photos from that week's photo shoot.

Each episode, one contestant is eliminated, though in rare cases a double elimination or non-elimination was given by consensus of the judging panel. Makeovers are given to contestants early in the cycle (usually after the first or second elimination) and a trip to an international destination is sometimes scheduled about two-thirds of the way through the cycle.

In contrast the American version, the contestants receive instruction from a mentor who helps coach them in various aspects of the modelling industry and acts as a general assistant during photo shoots and challenges. Past mentors have included Joey Mead King (cycles 1–3), Kelly Tandiono (cycle 4) and Cara G. McIlroy (cycle 5). Beginning with cycle 4, the show adapted the scoring system introduced in the American version. The scores included the judges' scores of photoshoot and the challenge scores.

== Judges ==
For the sixth cycle, Cindy Bishop and Yu Tsai returned to the panel as the host and creative consultant of the show, respectively. Cara G. McIlroy did not return for the sixth cycle. Instead, she was replaced by Monika Sta. Maria from cycle 3, Shikin Gomez and Minh Tu Nguyen from cycle 5 as model mentors throughout the sixth cycle. However, they did not participate in the judging panel.

Previous judges of the show include photographers Todd Anthony Tyler (cycle 1), Mike Rosenthal (cycles 2–3), creative director Daniel Boey (cycle 1 & 4) and fashion designer Alex Perry (cycle 3), model mentor Joey Mead King (cycles 1–3), Kelly Tandiono (cycle 4), and Cara G. McIlroy (cycle 5), catwalk coach Adam Williams (cycle 2), and head judges/hosts Nadya Hutagalung (cycles 1–2), and Georgina Wilson (cycle 3).

Judge/Mentor	Cycles					
Judge/Mentor	1 (2012-2013)	2 (2014)	3 (2015)	4 (2016)	5 (2017)	6 (2018)
Hosts
Nadya Hutagalung	Main	Main				
Georgina Wilson			Main	Guest		
Cindy Bishop				Main	Main	Main
Judging Panelists
Daniel Boey	Main			Recurring	Recurring	
Joey Mead King	Main	Main	Main			
Todd Anthony Tyler	Main					
Mike Rosenthal		Main	Recurring			
Adam Williams	Guest	Main				
Alex Perry		Guest	Main			
Kelly Tandiono				Main		
Yu Tsai				Main	Main	Main
Cara G. McIlroy	Guest		Guest	Guest	Main	Guest

== Series overview ==
Cycle	Premiere date	Winner	Runner-up	Other contestants in order of elimination	Number of contestants	International destination/s
1 Singapore	25 November 2012	Jessica Amornkuldilok	Kate Ma & Stephanie Retuya	Kyla Tan, Monica Benjaratjarunun (quit), Bei Si Liu, Jee Choi & Filantropi Witoko, Thuy Trang Nguyen, Rachel Erasmus, Melissa Th'ng, Helena Chan, Aastha Pokharel, Sofia Wakabayashi	14	Batam; Hong Kong
2 Malaysia	8 January 2014	Sheena Liam	Jodilly Pendre	Jessie Yang, Elektra Yu, Bona Kometa, Jihye Moon, Nhu Thao Phan, Poojaa Gill, Sneha Ghosh & Janice Hermijanto, Tia Taveepanichpan, Natalie Pickles, Josephine Tan, Nicole Lee, Marie Nakagawa, Katarina Rodriguez	16	Hong Kong
3 Singapore	25 March 2015	Ayu Gani	Monika Sta. Maria	Shareeta Selvaraj, Kiana Guyon, Rani Ramadhany, Lorretta Chow & Celine Duong, Franchesca Lagua, Melissa Tan, KB Barlow, Tahlia Raji, Amanda Chan, Barbara Katsuki, Aimee Cheng-Bradshaw	14	None
4 Singapore	9 March 2016	Tawan Kedkong	Patricia Gunawan & Sang-in Kim	Maya Goldman, Tugs Saruul, Quynh Mai Ngo, Gwen Ruais, Alaiza Malinao (quit), Jessica Lam, Aldilla Hopkin-Hamid, May Myat Noe, Tuti Noor, Angie Watkins, Julian Flores	14	None
5 Singapore	5 April 2017	Maureen Wroblewitz	Minh Tu Nguyen & Shikin Gomez	Anjelica Santillan, Heidi Grods, Jennica Sanchez, Layla Ong, Alicia Amin, Randhawa Nametha (disqualified), Valerie Krasnadewi & Dorothy Petzold, Veronika Krasnasari, Cindy Chen, Clara Tan	14	Kuala Lumpur
6 Thailand	22 August 2018	Dana Slosar	Adela Marshall & Mia Sabathy	Lena Saetiao & Hody Yim, Sharnie Fenn, Iko Bustomi, Jesslyn Lim, Rubini Sambanthan, Yi Han Si, Jachin Manere, Thanh Vy Nguyen, Pim Bubear & Beauty Thet Thinn	14	None

== Contestants per country ==
Asia's Next Top Model contestants per country
Country/Region	Cycle					
Country/Region	1	2	3	4	5	6
China	Bei Si Liu	Jessie Yang	—N/a			
Hong Kong	Helena Chan	Elektra Yu	Kirsteen "KB" Barlow; Lorretta Chow	Jessica Lam	—N/a	Hody Yim
India	Rachel Erasmus	Sneha Ghosh	—N/a			
Indonesia	Filantropi Witoko	Janice Hermijanto; Bona Kometa	**Ayu Gani**; Tahlia Raji; Rani Ramadhany	Patricia Gunawan; Aldilla Zahra	Clara Tan; Veronika Krasnadewi; Valerie Krasnadewi	Jesslyn Lim; Iko Bustomi
Japan	Sofia Wakabayashi	Marie Nakagawa	Barbara Katsuki	—N/a		Sharnie Fenn
Malaysia	Melissa Th'ng	**Sheena Liam**; Josephine Tan	Melissa Tan; Shareeta Selvaraj	Tuti Noor	Shikin Gomez; Alicia Amin	Rubini Sambanthan
Mongolia	—N/a			Tugs Saruul	—N/a	
Myanmar	—N/a			May Myat Noe	—N/a	Beauty Thet Thinn
Nepal	Aastha Pokharel	—N/a				
Philippines	Stephanie Retuya	Jodilly Pendre; Katarina Rodriguez	Monika Sta. Maria; Amanda Chan; Franchesca Lagua	Julian Flores; Alaiza Malinao (Note: The contestant decided to quit the competition.); Gwen Ruais	**Maureen Wroblewitz**; Jennica Sanchez; Anjelica Santillan	Adela Marshall; Jachin Manere
Singapore	Kyla Tan	Nicole Lee; Poojaa Gill	Aimee Cheng-Bradshaw	Angie Watkins	Randhawa Nametha (Note: The contestant was disqualified in her respective season.); Layla Ong	Yi Han Si
South Korea	Jee Choi	Jihye Moon	—N/a	Sang-in Kim	—N/a	
Taiwan	Kate Ma	Natalie Pickles	—N/a		Cindy Chen	Mia Sabathy
Thailand	**Jessica Amornkuldilok**; Monica Benjaratjarunun	Tia Taveepanichpan	Kiana Guyon	**Tawan Kedkong**; Maya Goldman	Dorothy Petzold; Heidi Grods	**Dana Slosar**; Pim Bubear; Lena Saetiao
Vietnam	Thuy Trang Nguyen	Nhu Thao Phan	Celine Duong	Mai Ngô Quỳnh	Minh Tu Nguyen	Thanh Vy Nguyen

The contestant in bold won in her respective season.
The contestant in italic placed as a runner-up in her respective season.

== Controversies ==
=== Glenn Tan ===
Subaru executive Glenn Tan, who was a guest panelist in the fourth episode of cycle 4, sparked backlash on social media after reprimanding South Korean contestant Sang In Kim. Kim, who was told by Tan, "Who the fuck do you think you are to roll your eyes at me? If I'm the client, I am never, ever going to hire you!", was defended by fans of the show on Facebook. Executive producer of Asia's Next Top Model Sam Gollestani told the BBC, "Glenn provides the perspective of a client when choosing a model to front campaigns for products, which is why he was invited to be a guest judge this season. This scene is reflective of what considerations go into making these decisions when working in the fashion and modelling industry."

=== Mai Ngo ===
In May 2016, twelfth-placing contestant Mai Ngo Quynh, from Vietnam, was fined VND22,500,000 (US$1,000) by the Ministry of Culture, Sports and Tourism (MCST), after it was ruled that she had entered Asia's Next Top Model illegally. Vietnam's official rules specify that all people who participate in beauty competitions abroad must obtain secure permission from the MCST and have won at least one national title. Mai had previously competed on the Vietnamese version of Top Model and in Miss Universe Vietnam, but had not won any titles. It was reported that she was summoned to report to the MCST three times but had failed to do so. The MCST had previously banned her from walking in Vietnam International Fashion Week in April. Mai claimed she did not know that the rule applied to non-professional models, and applied for mitigation of penalty.

== Viewership ==
Cycle	Timeslot (UTC+08/+07)	Season premiere	Season finale	Network	Season	Regional viewers (in millions)	
1	Sun 8:55/7:55 pm	25 November 2012	17 February 2013	Star World	2012-2013	39	
2	Wed 9:40/8:40 pm	8 January 2014	9 April 2014	Star World	2014	—N/a	
3	Wed 8:45/7:45 pm	25 March 2015	17 June 2015	Star World	2015	—N/a	
4	Wed 9:00/8:00 pm	9 March 2016	1 June 2016	Star World	2016	—N/a	
5	Wed 9:00/8:00 pm	5 April 2017	28 June 2017	Star World	2017	15	Television
5	Wed 9:00/8:00 pm	5 April 2017	28 June 2017	Star World	2017	23	YouTube
6	Wed 9:00/8:00 pm	22 August 2018	24 October 2018	Fox Life	2018	N/A	

== International broadcasts ==
Asia's Next Top Model was broadcast in all parts of Asia via cable channel Star World (then Fox Life). The first, fifth and sixth cycle of the series were free to watch on the show's official YouTube channel, but the videos are currently set to private viewing. All other local free-to-air channels aired the series on a one-week delayed schedule.

Country/Region	Channel	Date	Translated title	Dub/Subtitle
Arab World	OSN Al Yawm (cycle 1)	12 January 2013	—N/a	—N/a
Hong Kong	TVB	TBA	—N/a	—N/a
Indonesia	RCTI (cycle 1)	7 December 2012	—N/a	Subtitled in Indonesian
Indonesia	TV One (cycle 4, 5)	20 March 2016 – 15 April 2017	—N/a	Subtitled in Indonesian
Indonesia	NET. (cycle 2, 6)	8 February 2014 – 22 August 2018	—N/a	Subtitled in Indonesian
Indonesia	INews (cycle 3)	25 March – 17 June 2015	—N/a	Subtitled in Indonesian
Japan	TV Asahi (cycle 1)	9 March 2013	—N/a	Dubbed in Japanese
Philippines	Studio 23 (cycle 1)	9 December 2012 – 3 March 2013	—N/a	—N/a
Philippines	Velvet (cycle 1)	9 December 2012 – 3 March 2013	—N/a	—N/a
Philippines	TV5 (cycles 2, 4-5)	16 January 2014 – 24 April 2014	—N/a	—N/a
Philippines	TV5 (cycles 2, 4-5)	23 March 2016	—N/a	—N/a
Philippines	GMA Network (cycle 3)	19 April 2015 – 12 July 2015	—N/a	—N/a
Singapore	Channel 5 (cycle 1)	2 December 2012	—N/a	—N/a
Singapore	Mio (cycle 3)	22 May 2015	—N/a	—N/a
Singapore	StarHub (cycle 3)	15 May 2015	—N/a	—N/a
South Korea	OnStyle (cycle 3)	13 December 2015	—N/a	—N/a
Thailand	Channel 8 (cycle 1)	4 December 2012	—N/a	Dubbed and subtitled in Thai
Thailand	Channel V Thailand (cycle 2)	15 January 2014	—N/a	Dubbed and subtitled in Thai
Thailand	3 SD (cycle 3)	21 April 2015	—N/a	Dubbed and subtitled in Thai
Thailand	3 Family (cycle 4,5)	20 March 2016	—N/a	Dubbed and subtitled in Thai
Thailand	3 Family (cycle 4,5)	15 April 2017	—N/a	Dubbed and subtitled in Thai
Thailand	Fox Thailand (cycle 5,6)	5 April 2017	—N/a	Dubbed and subtitled in Thai
Thailand	Fox Thailand (cycle 5,6)	22 August 2018		Dubbed and subtitled in Thai
Thailand	GMM 25 (cycle 6)	24 August 2018		Dubbed and subtitled in Thai
Vietnam	VTC – Let's Viet (cycle 1)	2 December 2012	Dubbed in Vietnamese	—N/a
Vietnam	VTC1 (cycle 4)	27 March 2016	Dubbed in Vietnamese	—N/a
Vietnam	VTV3 (cycle 5)	April 2017	Dubbed in Vietnamese	—N/a

== See also ==
- Cambodia's Next Top Model
- China's Next Top Model
- India's Next Top Model
- Top Model India
- Indonesia's Next Top Model
- Korea's Next Top Model
- The Models
- Philippines' Next Top Model
- Thailand's Next Top Model
- Vietnam's Next Top Model
