= Joey Mead King =

Filipino-Iranian television personality

Joey Mead-King
- Born: Joanne del Pilar Angeles; 12 September 1974 (age 52); Manila, Philippines
- Occupations: Television personality, fashion lifestyle host, runway coach, model mentor
- Years active: 1992–present
- Modeling information
- Height: 1.76 m (5 ft 9 1/2 in)
- Website: www.joeymeadking.com

Joey Mead King (born 12 September 1974) is a Filipino-Iranian television personality, fashion lifestyle host, runway coach and is the model mentor/co-judge on popular reality show, Asia's Next Top Model cycles two and three. She was named the BBC among the 100 Women of 2018. 2022 Released first autobiography Runaway Model publishes by Summit media Host of Metro Channel lifestyle show Women of Style Season 1 & 2 2023 Hosted the official launch of Vogue Philippines 2025 Hosted the first Philippine Music Awards held in SM Arena

== Early life ==
Mead was born in the Philippines. Her mother, Josephine del Pilar-Mead, is a Filipina, while her biological father is of Iranian descent. When she was four, she and her mother settled in Adelaide, Australia, with her Australian stepfather, Leslie Bertram Mead. She was raised in South Australia until her early teen years.

== Career ==
Mead started her modelling career at 15, while living in Manila, and continued to model in Bangkok and Hong Kong. Having picked up Australian and American accent tones from living in Australia and Asia, Joey can imitate accents. She is able to speak in Filipino, Australian, American, and British accents. Currently based in the Philippines, Mead can also speak and understand basic Tagalog.

She was a video jockey for Channel [V] International in Hong Kong from 1996 to 2000, and as a commercial model appeared on over 40 magazine covers, ad campaigns and commercials covers in Singapore, Malaysia, Thailand, Japan and Indonesia. She has lived and worked in New York City as a Ford model and is currently with Ford Los Angeles and San Francisco, and was the first Philippine model to lead in advertisements for Head & Shoulders and Lexus airing in USA and Canada.

She notably posed nude for the cover of the Eraserheads‘ 1997 album, Sticker Happy.

In 2008, a magazine cover with Mead wearing the Philippine flag as a bodysuit caused an uproar in local media, as it was seen as profanation violating the Flag and Heraldic Code of 1998. In her defense, Mead said:

Yes, I wore a representation of the Philippine flag on a magazine cover. This image for me is something that is inspiring, the same way sports brands have produced their Philippine flag-inspired track sports jackets and limited edition shoes. It is the same logic why people put Philippine flag or map tattoos on their bodies.

When you’ve done as many magazine covers as I have, you’d want to do something that meant more to you — this means a lot to me, it represents my work, and I’m not embarrassed about the female form. I wanted to make a statement. I wanted to be part of something that breaks the “rules” and provoke people to think and feel...

She returned to Singapore in 2005 to host entertainment show Ebuzz on AXN channel, where she interviewed Hollywood celebrities such as Keanu Reeves, Morgan Freeman, Liam Neeson, Katie Holmes, Ken Watanabe, Christian Bale and directors Francis Lawrence and Christopher Nolan. In 2006, she hosted the World Cup series in Singapore for StarHub, and worked a presenter for HBO Asia from 2008 to 2009.

Her hosting skills won her work for lifestyle, corporate, red carpet, and live interviews. In 2012, it was announced that she would be the model mentor and co-judge for Asia's Next Top Model for three cycles. In 2015 Joey joined The History Channels first season of Celebrity Car Wars. Joey co-presented the Miss Universe 2016 pageant at the Mall of Asia Arena in Pasay, Metro Manila, on January 30, 2017. 2017 to 2019 Joey hosted two seasons of Metro Channels lifestyle show Women Of Style. Winning an award for best Lifestyle show in the Philippines. In 2022 Joey released her first autobiography titled Runaway Model sharing three decades of life experiences in modeling ,television and personal challenges. Published by summit media.

== Personal life ==
An ambassador for the Philippine Animal Welfare Society (PAWS), Mead is an advocate of animal rights and is against animal cruelty. She moved back to the Philippines in 2007, and in 2011 married Chinese Filipino businessperson Angelina "Angie" Mead King in November 2011. In 2016, Angie came out as a transgender woman, with Mead’s support. In 2017, TLC premiered "The Kings", a special about the couple's relationship since Angie's transition.
