= Mitigation (law) =

Principle in law

Mitigation in law is the principle that a party who has suffered loss (from a tort or breach of contract) has to take reasonable action to minimize the amount of the loss suffered. As stated by the Canadian Federal Court of Appeal in Redpath Industries Ltd. v. Cisco (The), "It is well established that a party who suffers damages as a result of a breach of contract has a duty to mitigate those damages, that is to say that the wrongdoer cannot be called upon to pay for avoidable losses which would result in an increase in the quantum of damages payable to the injured party." The onus on showing a failure to mitigate damages is on the defendant. In the UK, Lord Leggatt describes the "function of the doctrine of mitigation" as enabling the law

to distinguish between effects on the claimant's financial position which are to be regarded as caused by the defendant's breach of contract and for which damages can therefore be recovered and effects which are attributed to the claimant's own action or inaction in response to the breach and for which the defendant is not liable.

Iain Drummond notes that in English law there is no duty to mitigate loss. Rather, the principle is that "damages will be limited by an assumption that [a plaintiff] has taken reasonable steps in mitigation of loss", regardless of whether they have not in fact taken such steps. Even where case law speaks of a "duty to mitigate", the duty has been cited as "not a demanding one".

The issue of what is reasonable is especially contentious in personal injury cases where the plaintiff refuses medical advice. This can be seen in cases such as Janiak v. Ippolito.

The antonym of mitigation is aggravation.

== Examples ==
For example, consider a tenant who signs an agreement to rent a house for a year, but moves out (and stops paying rent) after only one month. The landlord may be able to sue the tenant for breach of contract: however, the landlord must mitigate damages by making a reasonable attempt to find a replacement tenant for the remainder of the year. The landlord may not simply let the house lie empty for eleven months and then sue the tenant for eleven months' rent.

The actions of the defendant may also result in the mitigation of damages which would otherwise have been due to the successful plaintiff. For example, the Civil Law (Wrongs) Act 2002 (ACT) provides that mitigation of damages for the publication of defamatory matter may result from any apology made by a defendant and any correction published (s. 139I).

In Manton Hire & Sales Ltd v Ash Manor Cheese Co Ltd. (appeal judgment in 2013), the hirer of an unsuitably wide fork lift truck was justified in rejecting the supplier's proposed mitigation when the supplier had "only [made] an unclear offer to modify the product without specifying "the exact extent" to which the truck was to be modified.

In the case of Thai Airways International Public Company Ltd v KI Holdings Co Ltd. (2015), a number of mitigating actions are listed which had been taken by Thai Airways in response to a supplier's failure to deliver airplane seating which had been ordered for its planes. In this case the airline had a number of alternative means of mitigating its loss.

== See also ==
- Mitigating factor
