= Lynn Yang Wolf =

Burmese-German model

- Born: June 30, 1989 (age 37)
- Education: Nanyang Technological University
- Years active: 2003–present
- Known for: Supermodel Me contestant

Lynn Yang Wolf (born June 30, 1989) is a Myanmar-German model and business woman best known for representing Myanmar in Supermodel Me (season 3). She has graced the covers of several magazines in Myanmar, including Focus Online, Lifestyle, Fashion Image, and SH, and has been featured in FHM (Singapore) and Female (Singapore). She has completed her bachelor's degree in Digital Filmmaking at the Art, Design & Media school of Nanyang Technological University.

== Model career ==
Her first break was in 2003 when she was approached by Adidas Myanmar to be featured in their campaign. She was quickly found by Star Cola soon after which led on to major billboards in Yangon. She was nicknamed "The Star Cola Girl." However the modeling industry in Myanmar at that time was not interested in Pan-Asian faces.

In Singapore Lynn had better luck finding jobs especially in print ads and music videos. However, there was a large number of Pan-Asian models in the market which made it hard to stand out.

Her big break came in 2011 when she was selected to participate in Supermodel Me (Season 3), a reality TV show that consisted of a group of models competing for an array of prizes. She was the first contestant in Supermodel Me history to be disqualified.

She was then featured FEMALE magazine's "FEMALE's 50 Gorgeous People" (November 2011) and FHM (Singapore) (August 2012).

== Controversy ==
During the filming of Supermodel Me (Season 3) Lynn and another competitor snuck out of the model house in the middle of the night and came back 2 hours later, intoxicated. She claimed to not be the person in charge of the arrangement of sneaking out but was still disqualified in an unexpected elimination. Her competitor was voted to still compete but with a disadvantage at the next photoshoot.

The New Paper later reported that Lynn's cat had died during her filming of Supermodel Me (Season 3) something she only found out when she snuck out of the model house and into her own house in Singapore, and therefore, was not in a mood to put up a good explanation to avoid disqualification.

Lynn also claimed that a rival competitor had tricked her to sneak out, and in the Reunion episode of Supermodel Me (Season 3) was able to clear the air with the audience of her sudden disqualification.
