= Roshni Kaur Soin =

Singaporean model (born 1986)

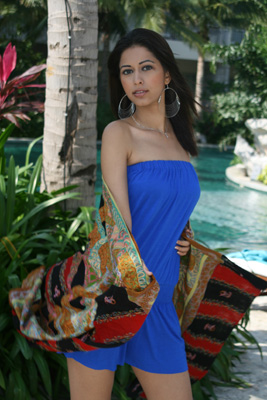
- Born: Roshni Kaur Soin; 1986 (age 39–40); Singapore
- Beauty pageant titleholder
- Title: Miss Singapore 2007

Roshni Kaur Soin is a Singaporean model and beauty pageant titleholder who was named Miss Singapore World 2007 and went on to represent Singapore in Miss World 2007 in China. She studied for a Psychology diploma in MDIS and works as a model.

In 2010, she joined the cast of Supermodel Me (season 2) as one of the 12 aspiring models.
