= MYTV International =

MYTV International Ltd is a company in digital entertainment media industry. The field of operations includes business music and music video service for DJs and VJs, IPTV development, and digital signage. MYTV product family combines the multimedia and networking technology to produce a digital media networking system that provides control and flexibility of delivering entertaining and promotional content. The products of MYTV International Ltd. are TrendSign and miXJay.

MYTV was established in Finland in 2000. At the beginning MYTV was part of UCM Group Oy. CEO Petteri Honkaniemi was founder of MYTV concept in UCM Group. In January 2002 shareholders of MYTV International bought the business model from publishing company UCM Group and started to develop the MYTV concept as core business of MYTV International and MYTV Finland Ltd. MYTV International is private owned company. At the present MYTV International has offices in 9 countries worldwide.
