= Terence Lee =

Japanese comedian

Terence Lee (テレンス・リー (Terensu Rī), 1964–), born Yoshiteru Katō 加藤善照 (Katō Yoshiteru), is a Japanese comedian. He is a self-styled ex-mercenary who claims to have been scouted as mercenary in the United Kingdom, and to have worked as a gifted sniper.

On December 9, 2009, it was reported that he was severely injured by a drunkard attack, which occurred around Sagamihara Station.
