= Nadya Hutagalung =

Australian model, actress, and presenter (born 1974)

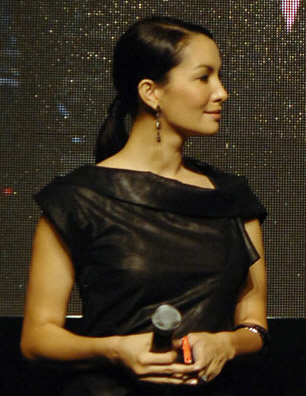
- Nadya Hutagalung, November 2009
- Born: Nadya Yuti Hutagalung; 28 July 1974 (age 52); Sydney, New South Wales, Australia
- Occupations: Model; actress; presenter
- Years active: 1995–present
- Spouse: Desmond Koh (m. 2006)
- Children: 3
- Modeling information
- Agency: Fly Entertainment

Nadya Yuti Hutagalung is an Australian model, actress, and presenter. She is known as the host and judge of the first two cycles of Asia's Next Top Model, one of the first VJs on MTV Asia, and a VJ on American MTV.

She was born in Sydney to an Australian mother and an Indonesian Batak father. Her first marriage was with Korean stuntman Jung Doo-hong in 1998. She later married Desmond Koh at the Uma Ubud in Bali on 16 December 2006, and currently resides in Singapore. She practices Buddhism.

Besides her modeling, she's also a MediaWorks artist, painter, and jewelry designer. She launched her sustainable jewelry line called OSEL, which means ŒClear Light¹ in Tibetan.

== Parody formats (impersonate) ==
1. Sule : Nadya Sule (Big Show - TPI)
2. Wendy Cagur : Wendy Hutagalung (Big Show - TPI)
3. Denny Cagur : Wawan Hutagalung (Sahur Segerr & Opera Van Java - Trans7)
4. Gilang Dirga : Gilang Hutagalung (Opera Van Java - Trans7)
