= Cindy Bishop =

Thai model and actress (born 1978)

- สิรินยา เบอร์บริดจ์
- Bishop in 2026
- Born: Cynthia Carmen Burbridge; 30 December 1978 (age 47); Bangkok, Thailand
- Other name: Sirinya Burbridge
- Occupations: Model; actress; activist; television presenter
- Height: 1.78 m (5 ft 10 in)
- Spouse: Byron Bishop (m. 2005)
- Children: 2
- Beauty pageant titleholder
- Title: Miss Thailand World 1996
- Years active: 1996–present
- Hair color: Black
- Eye color: Blue
- Major competitions: Miss Thailand World 1996 (Winner); Miss World 1996 (Unplaced)

Cindy Burbridge (born 30 December 1978) or Sirinya Burbridge (Thai: สิรินยา เบอร์บริดจ์), better known as Cindy Bishop, is a Thai model, actress, beauty pageant titleholder, activist, and amateur artist. She is best known as the former host and judge on reality competition show Asia's Next Top Model.

== Early life ==
Bishop was born in Bangkok and raised in Pattaya. She is an only child born to elderly parents. Her father, William Burbridge, is American and her mother, Patricia, is half English, one-quarter Indian and one-quarter Thai. Bishop attended Ruamrudee International School in Bangkok and graduated from Public Relations at Bangkok University

In 2005, she married Byron Bishop, a Japanese American model. They have two children.

== Career ==
Bishop started diving at the age of 5 and through this landed her first modelling contract for an underwater commercial shoot for a diving equipment store.

In 1996, Bishop won the Miss Thailand World pageant and represented Thailand in the Miss World pageant in Bangalore, India where she was unplaced and didn't make it to the semi-finals.

Bishop's work in films include The King Maker, which she was nominated for best supporting actress at the 2005 Suphanahong Awards in Thailand, and All I See is You (2016). She has also starred in numerous Thai drama series such as Gossip Girl: Thailand, playing the role of Lily Wijitranukul, City Of Light (The OC Thailand) (Thai adaptation of the original American series), Clueless and From Dreams to Eternity.

In 2016, Bishop presented the fourth cycle of Asia's Next Top Model and still continues her role until the sixth cycle in 2018. She also hosted 2 episodes of Britain's Next Top Model Cycle 12.

In 2021, Bishop starred in F4 Thailand: Boys Over Flowers, the Thai adaptation of the popular Japanese shōjo manga Boys Over Flowers by Yoko Kamio. She played the role of Thyme's (Bright aka Vachirawit Chivaaree) mother.

She was co-host of the inaugural Eurovision Song Contest Asia 2026.

== Activism ==
In 2018, Bishop launched a social-media campaign, #DontTellMeHowToDress. Later she posted a video with her message "Don’t tell women what to wear; tell men to respect women" that has taken the internet by storm. Bishop teamed up with the Thai Women and Men Progressive Movement Foundation and UN Women turned the campaign into an exhibition, starting Jun 25, 2018, to raise awareness of sexual harassment and victim-blaming in Thailand.

== Awards ==
Bishop was on the list of the BBC's 100 Women announced on 23 November 2020.

== Filmography ==
=== Film ===
Year	Title	Role	Notes
2003	Sin Sisters (ผู้หญิง 5 บาป)		
2005	The King Maker (กบฏท้าวศรีสุดาจัน)	Maria	
2016	All I See Is You		United States
2021	Kate	Mother (Deleted uncredited role)	United States
2022	Karmalink	Dr. Sophia	

=== Television ===
==== TV Series ====
Year	Title	Role	Network
1996	Madame Mod (มาดามมด)		
1997	Sanaeha Payabaht (เสน่หาพยาบาท)	Michelle	Channel 3
1998	Jark Fun Su Nirandon (จากฝันสู่นิรันดร)	Ranee	Channel 3
1999	Ruk Lae Patubai (รักเล่ห์เพทุบาย)		Channel 3
1999	Ror Wan Chan Mee Ther (รอวันฉันมีเธอ)		Channel 3
2000	Prakasit Ngern Tra (ประกาศิตเงินตรา)	Sharon	Channel 3
2002	Jom Kon Plon Pa Lok (จอมคนปล้นผ่าโลก)	Sikharin	Channel 7
2002	Plerng Maya (เพลิงมายา)	Kirana	Channel 7
2004	Jao Sao Glua Fon (เจ้าสาวกลัวฝน)	Chonwasa	Channel 3
2005	Kularb See Dum (กุหลาบสีดำ)	Songthip	Channel 3
2006	Likit Ruk Likit Luerd (ลิขิตรัก ลิขิตเลือด)	Helen	Channel 5
2009	Sakul Ka (สกุลกา)	Walai	Channel 5
2013	Paap Ataan (ภาพอาถรรพณ์)	Pinsuda	Channel 5
2014	Leh Nang Fah (เล่ห์นางฟ้า)	Grace Miller	Channel 5
2015	Ugly Betty Thailand (ยัยเป็ดขี้เหร่)	Sofia	Thairath TV
2015	Gossip Girl Thailand (แสบใสไฮโซ)	Lily van der Woodsen	Channel 3
2015	Thephabutra Sud Waeha (เทพบุตรสุดเวหา)	Lady Supakawadee	Channel 3
2015	Torfun & Marwin (ทอฝันกับมาวิน)	Wipada	One HD
2016	The O.C. Thailand (กรุงเทพ..มหานครซ้อนรัก)	Jane	One HD
2016	Plerng Naree (เพลิงนรี)	Kanda	Channel 3
2016	O-Negative (รัก-ออกแบบไม่ได้)	Doung	GMM25, Netflix
2018	The Crown Princess (ลิขิตรัก)	Princess Mona	Channel 3
2018	Back in Bangkok	Candy	TBA
2021–2022	F4 Thailand: Boys Over Flowers	Rosalyn Paramaanantra	GMM25
2023	Home School (นักเรียนต้องขัง)	Headmaster Yani	GMM25, Amazon Prime Video
2024	Don't Come Home (อย่ากลับบ้าน)	Panida	Netflix

==== TV program ====
Year	Title	Role	Network
2016	Asia's Next Top Model (cycle 4)	Main Judge (host)	STAR World
2017	Asia's Next Top Model (cycle 5)	Main Judge (host)	STAR World
2017	Britain's Next Top Model (cycle 12)	Judge (host) (Episodes 8–9)	Lifetime (UK and Ireland)
2018	Miss Tiffany's Universe: The Reality Season 2	Mentor	GMM 25
2018	Asia's Next Top Model (cycle 6)	Main Judge (host)	Fox Life
2018	Miss Thailand World 2018 The Reality	Main Judge (host)	Channel 3 (Thailand) SD
2021	Supermodel Me (Season 6)	Main Judge (host)	AXN Asia
2026	Supermodel Me (Season 7)	Main Judge	FlareFlow, TikTok
2026	The Face Thailand season 7	Mentor	Channel 3 (Thailand); Netflix

== Awards and nominations ==
Year	Award	Category	Nominated work	Results
1996	Miss Thailand World 1996			Winner
1996	Miss World 1996			Unplaced
2005	Suphannahong National Film Awards	Best Supporting Actress	The King Maker (กบฏท้าวศรีสุดาจัน)	Nominated

Awards and achievements
Preceded by Yasumin Leautamornwattanai	Miss Thailand World; 1996	Succeeded by Tanya Suesuntisook
