= Kevin Ou =

Kevin Christopher Ou
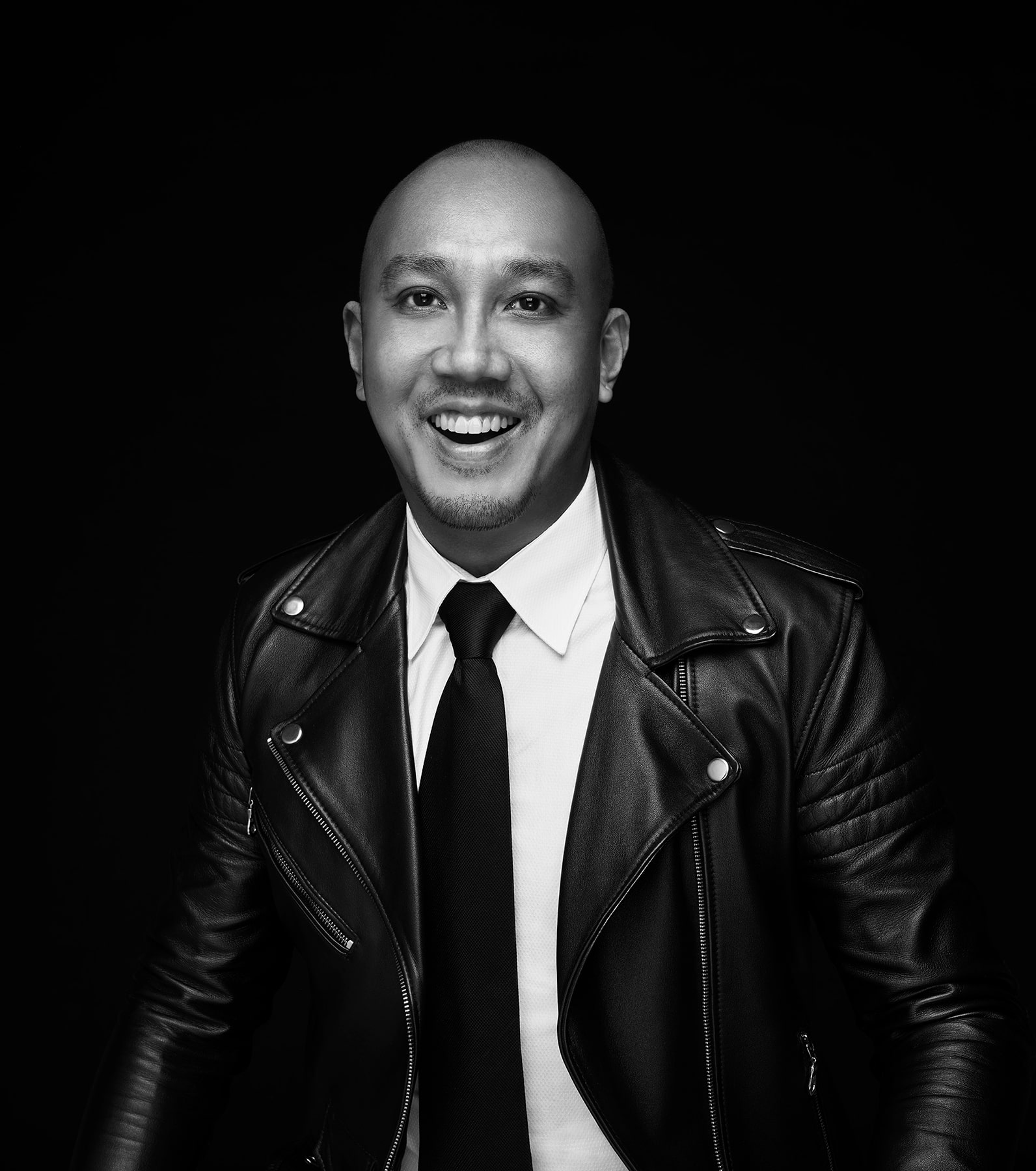
- Born: Kevin Christopher Ou; March 4, 1979 (age 47); Singapore
- Occupations: Photographer, Entrepreneur
- Years active: 1997–present
- Website: imkevinou.com

Kevin Christopher Ou (born March 4, 1979) is a Singaporean-American photographer.

== Biography ==
Ou was born in Singapore, on March 4, 1979. He attended St. Joseph's Institution International High-School and graduated in 1991. Later, he attended Catholic Junior College in 1997. In 1999, he enrolled in the Mass Communications program at Ngee Ann Polytechnic. Ou left Singapore after being "turned away" from a photography class.

He moved to Los Angeles in 2000 after getting a Mass Communications diploma from Ngee Ann Polytechnic. He studied photography and art at the Art Center College of Design in Pasadena, California, and graduated in 2004. After graduation, Kevin worked as a photographer on national advertising campaigns for a number of automobile manufacturers. After the automobile industry's shift to CGI-based work, he pivoted to do work for celebrities, politicians, music artists, and actors, who included Ludacris, Elijah Wood and Mariah Carey.

In 2011, Ou served as a judge for a photography contest held by CMYK magazine.

== Career ==
After graduation, Ou began his career working on national advertising campaigns for automobile manufacturers. As the industry shifted towards CGI-based work, he transitioned to photographing celebrities, politicians, musicians, and actors.
