= Diva (Asian TV channel) =

Defunct Asian pay television channel (1997-2019)

- Country: Singapore
- Broadcast area: Southeast Asia/ASEAN (including Singapore)
- Network: NBCUniversal International Networks
- Headquarters: Marina Bay Sands, 10 Bayfront Avenue, Marina Bay, Downtown Core, Singapore

Programming
- Languages: English; Chinese (Mandarin/Cantonese); Indonesian; Malay; Thai; Filipino; Vietnamese
- Picture format: 1080i (HDTV 16:9)

Ownership
- Owner: NBCUniversal
- Sister channels: CNBC Asia; E!

History
- Launched: 30 November 1997; 28 years ago
- Closed: 1 January 2020; 6 years ago
- Former names: Hallmark Channel (1997-2010); Diva Universal (2010-2014)

Links
- Website: divatv.asia

Diva (formerly Diva Universal) was an English-language pay television channel in Singapore. It launched on 30 November 1997 as Hallmark Channel, along with E! to viewers across Southeast Asia and ASEAN. In 2010, the channel was renamed Diva Universal and then Diva in 2014. It closed on 1 January 2020, after 22 years of broadcasting in anticipation of the launch of the streaming service Hayu in the region after the channel space created in 2001 by Hallmark Channel ceased to exist.

== History ==
Hallmark Channel Asia was launched on 30 November 1997 with E!. It had four different feeds including the Philippine one, which was launched on 19 August 2009.

Hallmark Channel Asia was rebranded as Diva Universal on 19 September 2010, after its brand licensing agreement with Crown Media ended, as part of Universal Networks International's efforts to refocus its network portfolio. Coinciding with the launch of its high-definition feed, the SD channel started broadcasting in 16:9 widescreen on 1 February 2014. On 16 June 2014, Diva Universal's name was simplified to Diva.

On 28 January 2015, the HD version of Diva was launched.

On 1 January 2020 at midnight, Diva ceased broadcasting.

== Former operating channels ==
- Diva Asia - Available in Singapore, Kuala Lumpur, Manila, Hong Kong, Taipei, Bangkok, Jakarta, Hanoi and Ho Chi Minh City in SD format.
- Diva Asia HD - Same as the Asian feed, available in Singapore, Indonesia, Philippines, Hong Kong, Malaysia, Thailand, Taiwan and Vietnam.

== See also ==
- Diva Universal in various countries
