= Lisa S. =

American–Monegasque model based in Hong Kong

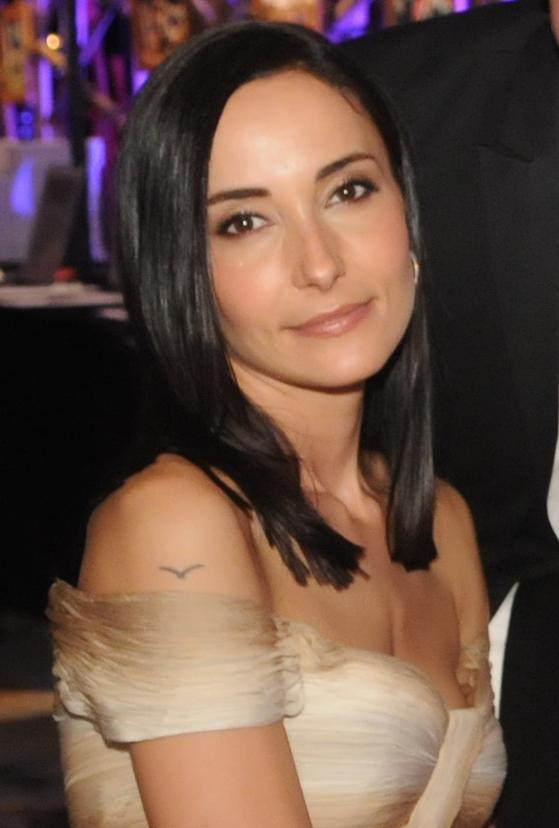
- Lisa S. at the Extravagant Simplicity Crossroads Foundation Fundraising Gala 2011
- Born: Lisa Selesner; May 26, 1978 (age 48); Monaco
- Occupations: Model; actress; television host
- Spouse: Daniel Wu (m. 2010)
- Children: 1

Lisa Selesner (born May 26, 1978), professionally known as Lisa S., is an American model, actress and Channel V video jockey based in Hong Kong.

== Early life ==
Lisa Selesner was born on May 26, 1978, in Monaco to an American mother and a father of French and Chinese descent. She was raised in New York City where she was talent-scouted to be a model at age 14. She was raised by her mother and her stepfather, Gary Selesner, who is the president of Caesars Palace.

She stated that she shortened her surname from Selesner to the initial "S" because after moving to Hong Kong in 2000, "no one could pronounce it".

== Career ==
In Hong Kong, she became a top model who appeared in advertisements for Citibank, De Beers and Olay. She has been described as a "bewitching designer-clad international model." She hosted a lifestyle programme on TV in Hong Kong. She also starred in three Hong Kong movies: Silver Hawk (2004), Rob-B-Hood (2006), A Mob Story (2007) and cameoed in the Chinese movie Inseparable (2011) which starred Daniel Wu and Kevin Spacey.

She is the founder of the monthly beauty box subscription 'Glamabox' which is provided in China, Taiwan, Hong Kong and Singapore.

== Personal life ==
On April 6, 2010, Lisa S. married Daniel Wu in South Africa, after eight years of dating. Their daughter was born in 2013. Prior to their marriage, their privacy was occasionally invaded by paparazzi.
