= The Apartment - Passion For Design =

- No. of episodes: 10

Release
- Original network: Sony Channel; AXN
- Original release: March 24 – May 26, 2018

Season chronology
- ← Previous; Season 5 Next → Season 7

The Apartment: Passion For Design is the sixth season of the reality show competition The Apartment, which is the longest running reality television show in Asia. The contestants are 12 up-and-coming interior designers competing for a luxury apartment at Johor Bahru, Malaysia. Its judges are Laurence Llewelyn-Bowen, Tyler Wisler, and Cat Arambulo-Antonio. With the sixth season, an online digital series, The Apartment Unboxed, was launched, including additional content. Fashion designer Stephanie Dods won the competition, becoming the second Filipino to win, after Deankie and Tiara in Season 3.

== Contestants ==
Contestant	Profession	From	Finish	Place
Aung Naing Linn "Linnk"	Interior decorator & artist	Singapore	Episode 2	12
Olga Ivanova	Model	Thailand	Episode 3	11
Mike V Piroon	DJ and hip-hop artist	Thailand	Episode 4	10
Elin Nguyen	Interior decorator	Vietnam	Episode 5	9
Rocket	Photographer and creative director	United States	Episode 6	8
Lisa Marie White	Beauty Queen	Singapore	Episode 7	7
Shana Wang	Entrepreneur	United States	Episode 8	6-5
Vlad Musson	Model	Australia	Episode 8	6-5
Eugene del Rosario	Interior designer	Philippines	Episode 9	4-3
Jesy Cruz	Interior Decorator	Philippines	Episode 9	4-3
Rachel Lee	Makeup artist	Malaysia	Episode 10	2
Stephanie Dods	Fashion designer	Philippines	Episode 10	1

== Judges ==
- Jamie Durie
- Laurence Llewelyn-Bowen
- Tyler Wisler
- Cat Arambulo-Antonio

== Episodes ==
No.	Original air date	Title	Guest judge	Winner	Eliminated
1	March 24, 2018	"Let The Design Begin (Living Room)"	Jeremy Rowe	Team Rocket	None
As the competition begins, the first quick challenge tests the designer's knowledge of colours, tools, and famous designs and designers, while simultaneously placing them into one of four teams. Then they have to decorate the living room as the first main challenge. At the judging room, team Rocket win the challenge and team Vlad are the worst of the week. Vlad was the original eliminee but was saved by Laurence Llewelyn-Bowen.
2	March 31, 2018	"Time For Work Out (Workout Room)"	Todd Anthony Tyler	Team Rachel	Aung Naing Linn "Linnk"
3	April 7, 2018	"Touchdown To Planet Cat (Bedroom)"	None	Team Elin	Olga Ivanova
4	April 14, 2018	"Welcome To The Jungle (Garden)"	Jamie Durie	Team Jesy; Team Stephanie	Mike V Piroon
5	April 21, 2018	"Design For Care (The Orphanage)"	Jamie Durie	Team Jesy	Elin
6	April 28, 2018	"Blank Space (The White Room)"	None	Shana Wang	Rocket
7	May 5, 2018	"Love & War (Nursery)"	Jeremy Rowe	Team Eugene	Lisa Marie White
8	May 12, 2018	"Let's Cook! (Dining Room & Kitchen)"	Young Lim	Team Eugene	Vlad Musson & Shana Wang
9	May 19, 2018	"Order From The Devil (LLB'S Room)"	None	None	Eugene del Rosario & Jesy Cruz
10	May 26, 2018	"The Passionate Of Them All (Finale)"	Jeremy Rowe; KK Wong; Cameron Woo; Young Lim	Stephanie Dods	Rachel Lee

== Teams ==
Episode	Team		
Episode	Team	Captain	Members
1	Lisa Marie	Lisa Marie	Eugene, Linnk
1	Rachel	Rachel	Jesy, Mike
1	Rocket	Rocket	Olga, Stephanie
1	Vlad	Vlad	Elin, Shana
3	Eugene	Eugene	Lisa Marie
3	Rachel	Rachel	Jesy, Mike
3	Rocket	Rocket	Olga, Stephanie
3	Elin	Elin	Shana, Vlad
4	Stephanie	Stephanie	Lisa Marie, Shana
4	Rocket	Rocket	Elin, Rachel
4	Vlad	Vlad	Mike
4	Jesy	Jesy	Eugene
5	Stephanie	Stephanie	Lisa Marie, Shana
5	Rocket	Rocket	Elin, Rachel
5	Jesy	Jesy	Eugene, Vlad
6	Lisa Marie	Lisa Marie	Shana, Stephanie
6	Rocket	Rocket	Rachel
6	Jesy	Jesy	Eugene, Vlad
7	Eugene	Eugene	Lisa Marie, Stephanie
7	Shana	Shana	Rachel
7	Jesy	Jesy	Vlad
8	Eugene	Eugene	Rachel, Shana
8	Stephanie	Stephanie	Jesy, Vlad
9	Eugene	Eugene	Rachel
9	Stephanie	Stephanie	Jesy
10	Rachel	Rachel	Eugene, Vlad
10	Stephanie	Stephanie	Jesy, Shana

== Elimination ==
Elimination chart
Contestant	1	2	3	4	5	6	7	8	9	10
(Philippines) Stephanie	WIN	IN	LOW	WIN	IN	IN	WIN	LOW	IN	WINNER
(Malaysia) Rachel	IN	WIN	IN	IN	LOW	IN	IN	WIN	IN	RUNNER-UP
(Philippines) Jesy	IN	WIN	IN	WIN	WIN	LOW	LOW	IN	ELIM	
(Philippines) Eugene	IN	LOW	IN	WIN	WIN	IN	WIN	WIN	ELIM	
(United States) Shana	LOW	IN	WIN	WIN	IN	WIN	LOW	ELIM		
(Australia) Vlad	LOW	IN	WIN	LOW	WIN	IN	IN	ELIM		
(Singapore) Lisa Marie	IN	LOW	IN	WIN	IN	LOW	ELIM			
(United States) Rocket	WIN	IN	LOW	LOW	LOW	ELIM				
(Vietnam) Elin	LOW	IN	WIN	IN	ELIM					
(Thailand) Mike	IN	WIN	IN	ELIM						
(Thailand) Olga	WIN	IN	ELIM							
(Singapore) Linnk	IN	ELIM								

Green background and WINNER means the contestant won The Apartment - Passion for Design.
Silver background and RUNNER-UP means the contestant was the runner-up on The Apartment - Passion for Design.
Blue background and WIN means the contestant won that challenge.
Pink background and BTM 3 mean the contestant worst challenge but safe.
Orange background and BTM 2 mean the contestant worst challenge but safe.
Purple background and ELIM means the contestant win and was eliminated of the competition.
Red background and ELIM means the contestant lost and was eliminated of the competition.
