= The Apartment (TV series) =

Reality television show

- Presented by: Kahi Lee (season 1); Jamie Durie (season 2-present)
- Judges: Kahi Lee; Alice Nguyen; Martin Haeger; Jamie Durie; Laurence Llewelyn-Bowen; Andrea Savage; Genevieve Gorder; Cameron Woo; Elliot Barratt; Tyler Wisler; Cat Arambulo-Antonio
- Country of origin: Malaysia
- No. of seasons: 7
- No. of episodes: 68

Original release
- Network: STAR World (Season 1-4); Sony Channel (Season 5 and 6); AXN (Season 5 and 6); Diva (Season 7)
- Release: October 27, 2011 – December 15, 2019

The Apartment is a reality television show created by Riaz Mehta and produced by Imagine Group. Premiering in 2011 on Star World, it is currently the longest running reality competition television show in Asia. From season 2, it is presented by Jamie Durie (Kahi Lee hosted the inaugural season), while the judges include Laurence Llewelyn-Bowen and Genevieve Gorder among others.

The show sees contestants design and decorate a room each week in order to compete for the series end prize of a luxury apartment in Kuala Lumpur. The fourth season was a celebrity version where the prize was $100,000 to be donated to their chosen charity. The fifth season had the prize of $100,000 for the winners. The sixth season, The Apartment - Passion For Design had twelve interior designers competing for a luxury apartment at Johor Bahru, Malaysia. With the sixth series an online digital series, The Apartment Unboxed, was launched alongside the main show and included additional content.

== Judges ==
Judge	Cycle						
Judge	1 (2011)	2 (2012)	3 (2013)	4 (2015)	5 (2017)	6 (2018)	7 (2019)
Kahi Lee	Head Judge						
Alice Nguyen	Judge		Guest Judge				
Martin Haeger	Judge						
Jamie Durie		Judge	Judge	Judge	Judge	Host	
Laurence Llewelyn-Bowen		Head Judge	Head Judge	Head Judge	Head Judge	Head Judge	Head Judge
Andrea Savage			Guest Judge	Judge			
Genevieve Gorder					Judge		
Cameron Woo					Guest Judge	Guest Judge	
Elliot Barratt			Judge				
Tyler Wisler						Judge	Judge
Cat Arambulo-Antonio						Judge	Judge

== Season ==
Season	Premiere date	Winner	Runner-up	Number of contestants	Prize
1 Malaysia	October 27, 2011	Syed & Rodrigo	Jeremy & Renai; Michael & Artika	6 (3 team of 2)	Their own apartment in The Quarza in Kuala Lumpur
2 Malaysia	October 19, 2012	Dali (Iva & Philippe)	Opportunists (Alex & Chelsea)	16 (8 team of 2)	Their own apartment in The Veo in the outskirts of Kuala Lumpur
3 Malaysia	September 29, 2013	Deankie & Tiara	Yvette & Sonya	18 (9 team of 2)	A brand new double-storey home at Elmina
4 Thailand	January 25, 2015	Xiao Wang	Rima Fakih	12	A cash prize of $100,000 to donate to their chosen charity
5 Malaysia	March 18, 2017	Aleksandra Flasz	Winston See	12	A cash prize of $100,000
6 Malaysia	March 22, 2018	Stephanie Dods	Rachel Lee	12	Their own apartment in UMLand Seri Austin D'Lagoon worth nearly $200.000 in Johor Bahru; A feature spread in Singapore Home & Decor magazine
7 Malaysia	November 13, 2019	Adrien Kent	Seron Chau	12	A cash prize of $100,000

== International versions ==
=== Indonesian version ===
An Indonesian version of The Apartment (also known as Master Desain Apartemen) airs on MNCTV (for season 1) and GTV (for season 2). The first episode of the show premiered on September 3, 2017 and each episode is broadcast every Sunday, at 16:00 WIB (Western Indonesian Time). The show is hosted by Fenita Arie who gives the challenge and a panel including Matthew Munesh and Cosmas Gozali judge their work. The final winners were announced after the last episode, and the prize was their own apartment in The Ayodhya, Alam Sutera, in Tangerang. The first season winner is musician Alexis Brille.
