= The Apartment - Celebrity Edition =

4th season of the design competition show The Apartment

- The Apartment - Celebrity Edition
- No. of episodes: 10

Release
- Original network: STAR World
- Original release: January 25 – March 29, 2015

Season chronology
- ← Previous; Season 3 Next → Season 5

The Apartment - Celebrity Edition is the 4th season of the reality television show design competition, The Apartment which after six seasons is the longest running reality competition show in Asia. The season premiered on January 25, 2015 and aired on STAR World. Unlike previous seasons, the competitors were celebrities competing as individuals for a grand prize of $100,000 to donate to their chosen charity. The judging panel included mentor-judge Jamie Durie, judge Andrea Savage, and head judge Laurence Llewelyn-Bowen. Production for the season was held in Phuket, Thailand, with luxury villas provided by Castlewood Group. The show is created by Riaz Mehta and produced by Imagine Group.

== Format ==
Over 10 weeks, celebrities are given the challenge of designing one room or area in 1 of 4 luxury villas. For the first few weeks, the celebrities are divided into teams of 3 or 4 to collaborate on their designs. The winning team will receive a prize and may choose another team to share their prize with. Each team is evaluated by the three recurring judges and sometimes, with a guest judge, in the show's "Design Court". The losing team will face elimination and sign their stars on The Floor of Shame.

== Contestants ==
Contestants	Profession	From	Finish	Place
Patricia K	Model/DJ/Presenter	(Malaysia) Kuala Lumpur	Episode 1	12
Nicole Russo	Music producer/Songwriter/Singer	Hong Kong (United Kingdom) London	Episode 2	11 (Quit)
Cindy Gomez	Singer	Canada	Episode 3	10
Justin Bratton	Actor/Host/Model	Singapore	Episode 4	9
Bronson Pelletier	Actor	Canada; United States	Episode 5	8
Rolando Laudico (Chef Lau)	Chef	Philippines	Episode 7	7-6
Mary Christina Brown	Actress	United States	Episode 7	7-6
Lucy Clarkson-Demeo	Model/Host/Singer	(United States) US-based	Episode 8	5
Paula Taylor	Actress/Host/Model	Thailand	Episode 9	4-3
Ryan Star	Musician	United States	Episode 9	4-3
Rima Fakih	Miss USA 2010	United States	Episode 10	2
Xiao Wang	Actress/Model/Jewelry Designer	(United States) New York; China	Episode 10	1

== Episodes ==
No.	Title	Guest Judge	Winner	Eliminated	Original release date
1	"Breaking the Rules"	Jeremy Rowe	Team Paula	Patricia K	January 25, 2015
The twelve celebrities arrive in Phuket, Thailand to meet their judges and receive their first design mission. Their expectations of working as individuals are quickly dashed when host Jamie Durie reveals that they will be working together as teams. The surprises continue as these celebrities realize they'll also be living in the very luxury villas they're renovating. Their first challenge is The Master Bedroom. Bottom Two: Patricia K & Ryan Star.
2	"Meltdown in the Mud"	None	Team Xiao	Nicole Russo (Withdrawn)	February 1, 2015
The Garden is their next challenge with Phuket's rainy season in full force. As some teams struggle in the mud, others rally and drag in whole trees to incorporate into their design and finding surprising new friends to lend them resources. Nicole confides in Jamie she was going to leave the competition because she felt manipulated by the producers. Bottom Two: Mary Christina Brown & Rima Fakih.
3	"When Worlds Collide"	Jeremy Rowe	Team Rima	Cindy Gomez	February 8, 2015
The design mission is The Living Room with the theme East meets West. One team attempts to overthrow their team leader. Meanwhile, the team that struggled the most the week before put aside their differences to produce a coherent, if controversial, design. Laurence lets the two team leaders nominate one of their team members to be in the bottom two. Xiao nominated Ryan and Paula nominated Lucy, but Cindy was eliminated.
4	"The Kids Aren't Alright"	None	Team Xiao	Justin Bratton	February 15, 2015
The teams are shocked by the previous week's elimination. The design mission is The Kids' Room. It's a rapid challenge and the lack of time and money leaves the teams reeling. While one team builds on its previous success, the stress affects the trio that had been dubbed "team perfect". Bottom Three: Justin Bratton, Lucy Clarkson-Demeo and Paula Taylor.
5	"Plumbed Out"	Jeremy Rowe	Team Xiao	None	February 22, 2015
With the number of competitors dwindling, the teams face their most challenging design mission yet – The Bathroom, in which two bathrooms must be designed. Paint peeling off the wall and tiles cracking on the floor are some of the difficulties they face. Bottom Two: None.
6	"Changing Rooms"	Jeremy Rowe	Team Ryan	Bronson Pelletier	March 1, 2015
The bathroom challenge took its toll, leaving the judges to decide to start from scratch with brand new teams. The next design mission is The Leisure Room. Design Court flag before the contestant are Maldives, South Africa and Thailand. Bottom Two: Bronson Pelletier & Lucy Clarkson-Demeo.
7	"Spaced Out"	Christopher Comer	Team Rima	Chef Lau and Mary Christina Brown	March 8, 2015
The new design challenge is The Kitchen and Dining Area. The intense manual labor derails one of the teams. Meanwhile in another villa, a bold design is planned. Both Chef Lau & Ryan Star were to be eliminated, but, instead Ryan, was safe and Mary Christina was eliminated because the judges felt she was the lesser interior designer.
8	"Shaken not Stirred"	None	Paula Taylor and Ryan Star	Lucy Clarkson-Demeo	March 15, 2015
The kitchen was the last room in the villa, but the competition continues as Jamie surprises the contestants with a new off-site challenge to create designs for a James Bond inspired yacht party. Paula and Ryan were given the Goldfinger theme while Rima, Lucy and Xiao were given the Casino Royale theme. Bottom Three: Lucy Clarkson-Demeo, Rima Fakih and Xiao Wang.
9	"Looking Back"	None	Rima Fakih and Xiao Wang	Paula Taylor and Ryan Star	March 22, 2015
As the celebrities prepare for their biggest challenge yet, Jamie Durie hosts an all star look back at the season that got them here, including some surprising outtakes. At the next challenge, 4 remaining celebrities had to design a bedroom for the orphanage in 30 minute. Final Two: Rima Fakih & Xiao Wang.
10	"Giving Back"	Jeremy Rowe	Xiao Wang	Rima Fakih	March 29, 2015
The final design mission gives the last few celebrities a chance to compete as individuals in a design that will benefit many residents. Rima & Xiao had to design the entire orphanage in 72 hours.

== Teams ==
Episode	Team	
Episode	Captain	Members
1	Nicole	Patricia & Ryan
1	Paula	Justin & Lucy
1	Rima	Chef Lau & Mary Christina
1	Xiao	Bronson & Cindy
2 & 3	Paula	Justin & Lucy
2 & 3	Rima	Chef Lau & Mary Christina
2 & 3	Xiao	Bronson, Cindy & Ryan
4	Paula	Justin & Lucy
4	Rima	Chef Lau & Mary Christina
4	Xiao	Bronson & Ryan
5	Paula	Lucy
5	Rima	Chef Lau & Mary Christina
5	Xiao	Bronson & Ryan
6	Bronson	Lucy & Rima
6	Ryan	Mary Christina & Paula
6	Xiao	Chef Lau
7	Rima	Lucy
7	Ryan	Mary Christina & Paula
7	Xiao	Chef Lau
8	Rima	Lucy & Xiao
8	Ryan	Paula
9	Rima	None
9	Ryan	None
9	Xiao	None
9	Paula	None
10	Rima	None
10	Xiao	None

== Elimination ==
Elimination Chart
Contestant	1	2	3	4	5	6	7	8	9	10
(China) Xiao	SAFE	WIN	BTM 3	WIN	WIN	SAFE	BTM 3	BTM 2	WIN	WINNER
(United States) Rima	SAFE	BTM 2	WIN	SAFE	SAFE	BTM 3	WIN	BTM 2	WIN	RUNNER-UP
(Thailand) Paula	WIN	SAFE	BTM 3	BTM 2	SAFE	WIN	BTM 3	WIN	ELIM	
(United States) Ryan	BTM 2	WIN	BTM 2	WIN	WIN	WIN	BTM 2	WIN	ELIM	
(United States) Lucy	WIN	SAFE	BTM 2	BTM 2	SAFE	BTM 2	WIN	ELIM		
(Philippines) Chef Lau	SAFE	BTM 3	WIN	SAFE	SAFE	SAFE	ELIM			
(United States) Mary Christina	SAFE	BTM 2	WIN	SAFE	SAFE	WIN	ELIM			
(United States) Bronson	SAFE	WIN	BTM 3	WIN	WIN	ELIM				
(Singapore) Justin	WIN	SAFE	BTM 3	ELIM						
(Canada) Cindy	SAFE	WIN	ELIM							
(United Kingdom) Nicole	BTM 3	WDR								
(Malaysia) Patricia	ELIM									

The contestant won The Apartment - Celebrity Edition.
The contestant was the runner-up on The Apartment - Celebrity Edition.
The contestant won that challenge.
The contestant is in the bottom three but ultimately safe.
The contestant is in the bottom two but ultimately safe.
The contestant withdrew.
The contestant was eliminated from the competition.

== Broadcast ==
The show premiered on STAR World Asia on January 25, 2015 airing every Sunday night. STAR World Philippines aired the show 3 weeks later, premiering on February 17, 2015, and airing every Tuesday night.
