= The Apartment - Style Edition =

Second season of the design competition show The Apartment

- No. of episodes: 10

Release
- Original network: STAR World
- Original release: October 19 – December 20, 2012

Season chronology
- ← Previous; Season 1 Next → Season 3

The Apartment: Style Edition was the second season of the Asian reality television show The Apartment, which after six seasons is the longest running reality competition show in Asia. The concept is that eight pairs of people with one relation, friends, brothers, couples and even two strangers, were to cooperate to design one room each week for ten weeks. The host of the programme, Jamie Durie, gave the challenge and a panel including Laurence Llewelyn Bowen judged their work. The final winners were announced after the last episode, and the prize was their own apartment in The Veo in the outskirts of Kuala Lumpur.

The winner was team Dali (Iva and Philipe). The show was created by Riaz Mehta and produced by the Singapore-based Imagine Group.

== Contestants ==
Group name	Relationship	About
International Love	Friends	Paul Stephan: Australian general manager of a wine distributor, 34 years old. Aiysvariyah "Ash" Rajedadram: Malaysian student, 23 years old.
Design Divas	Friends	Cynthia MacQuarrie: Singaporean performer, 33 years old. Marie "Paula" Hinsley: American housewife, 32 years old.
Black & Blonde	Friends	Agri Velt: Indonesian fashion blogger, 24 years old Clarissa Rae Lim: Singaporean make-up artist, 24 years old
Strangerz	Strangers	JP Rangel: Filipino fashion designer, 28 years old Daniel: Malaysian boutique hotel manager, 36 years old
Glue & Glam	Friends	Kish Vin: Malaysian events manager, 27 years old. Merete "Merah" Noer: Norwegian art director, model, musician and designer, 24 years old
Bros United	Brothers	Jesper McIlroy: Canadian fashion photographer-model, 33 years old Killian McIlroy: American graphic designer, 29 years old
Opportunists	Friends	Alex Phang: Singaporean radio anchorman, 25 years old (at the time of the recording) Chelsea Chil Hsia Wong: Malaysian Model/singer, 34 years old
Dali	Couple	Iva Agüero: Argentine self-employed, 25 years old Philipe Estiot: French-German, self-employed, 32 years old

As there were eight teams and ten episodes with the last having the two finalists, only six pairs could have been eliminated the previous nine episodes. This was solved by having two episodes without elimination and the reintroduction of one of the teams that were eliminated earlier. Glue & Glam, the first team to be eliminated, were brought back.

== Episodes ==
No.	Title	Guest judge(s)	Winner	Eliminated	Original release date
1	"Design your Destiny"	Yiu Ling (Designer)	Dali (Iva & Philippe)	Glue & Glam (Mera & Kish)	October 18, 2012
2	"If You Can't Stand the Heat, Get Out of the Kitchen"	Chef Michel from The Hilton	The Strangerz (JP & Daniel)	International Love (Paul & Ash)	October 25, 2012
3	"I Kid You Not"	6 children aged 9 to 13	The Opportunists (Alex & Chelsea)	None	November 1, 2012
4	"Not Everything in the Garden is Rosy"	Kim Robinson	Dali (Iva & Philippe)	Design Divas (Paula & Cynthia)	November 8, 2012
5	TBA	Raz (Sime Darby Properties); Andrea Fonseka	The Strangerz (JP & Daniel) and Glue & Glam (Mera & Kish)	Black & Blonde (Agri & Clarissa)	November 15, 2012
Team "Glue & Glam" return to the competition.
6	"Stud vs Study"	Jeremy Rowe (Dulux); Paula Malai Ali (TV Celebrity)	Dali (Iva & Philippe)	None	November 22, 2012
7	"Guest of Horror"	Lisa Crosswhite (Fashion stylist)	The Opportunists (Alex & Chelsea)	Strangerz (JP & Daniel)	November 29, 2012
8	"There's Nothing Leisurely About this Challenge"	Carmen Soo	Bros United (Jesper & Killian)	Glue & Glam (Mera & Kish)	December 6, 2012
9	"The Elephant in the Living Room"	None	None	Bros United (Jesper & Killian)	December 13, 2012
3	"Home Sweet Home"	Raz (Sime Darby Property); Eddy Tan (STAR World); Lisa S.	Dali (Iva & Philippe)	The Opportunists (Alex & Chelsea)	December 20, 2012

== Elimination ==
Elimination Chart
Team	1	2	3	4	5	6	7	8	9	10
Dali	WIN	SAFE	SAFE	WIN	SAFE	WIN	SAFE	SAFE	BTM 2	WINNER
The Opportunists	SAFE	SAFE	WIN	SAFE	SAFE	SAFE	WIN	BTM 2	WIN	RUNNER-UP
Bros United	SAFE	SAFE	BTM 2	SAFE	BTM 2	SAFE	BTM 2	WIN	ELIM	
Glue & Glam	ELIM				WIN	BTM 2	SAFE	ELIM		
Strangerz	BTM 2	WIN	SAFE	SAFE	WIN	BTM 2	ELIM			
Black & Blonde	SAFE	BTM 2	SAFE	BTM 2	ELIM					
Design Divas	SAFE	SAFE	BTM 2	ELIM						
International Love	SAFE	ELIM								

The team won The Apartment Style Edition.
The team was the runner-up on The Apartment Style Edition.
The team won that challenge.
The team were in the bottom two but ultimately safe.
The team was eliminated from the competition.
