= Fit for Fashion season 2 =

Fit for Fashion
- Season 2
- Fit for Fashion
- No. of episodes: 10

Release
- Original network: STAR World
- Original release: January 7 – March 10, 2016

Season chronology
- ← Previous; Season 1

Fit for Fashion, season 2 is a reality TV show on STAR World hosted by Louise Roe, with fashion photographer Todd Anthony Tyler. The show features fitness trainers, Christine Bullock and Mitch Chilson. Each of the contestants will face challenges and learn new skills while training and transforming their bodies. The show was filmed in Indonesia with the state of Bintan, Riau Islands as its primary location and contestants' residence.

The winner of the competition receives a cash prize of $100,000, is featureded on the cover of Fitness First magazine, and a 1-year supply of clothing from Zalora.

== Contestants ==
| Name | Age | Hashtag | Residence | Results |
|---|---|---|---|---|
| Michael "Mikey" Gelonesi | 29 | #F4FMikey | Australia | Eliminated in Episode 1 |
| Anthony Dupree | 25 | #F4FAnthony | United States | Eliminated in Episode 2 |
| Vicki Wheeler | 35 | #F4FVicki | Australia | Eliminated outside of judging panel in Episode 3 |
| Katherine Patrick | 33 | #F4FKatherine | Australia | Eliminated in Episode 3 |
| Phagkamon "Lookpong" Punyabhuti | 27 | #F4FLookpong | Thailand | Eliminated in Episode 4 |
| Attila CK | 42 | #F4FAttila | Malaysia | Eliminated in Episode 4 |
| Katrina "Deena" Marzuki | 25 | #F4FDeena | Malaysia | Eliminated in Episode 6 |
| Freska "Cika" Darnadi | 34 | #F4FCika | Indonesia | Eliminated in Episode 7 |
| Vladimir Musson | 28 | #F4FVladimir | Australia | Eliminated in Episode 8 |
| Marlon Dance-Hooi | 30 | #F4FMarlon | Singapore | Eliminated in Episode 9 |
| Jessica "Jess" Punch | 26 | #F4FJess | Singapore | Eliminated in Episode 10 |
| Kyle Ramirez | 22 | #F4FKyle | Philippines | Runners-up |
| Sam Gaskin | 31 | #F4FSam | Australia | Runners-up |
| Jackie Zapata | 32 | #F4FJackie | United States | Winner |

== Episodes ==
=== Episode 1: Setting Goals ===
| Group | Members |
|---|---|
| Yellow | Vladimir, Mikey, Marlon, Sam, Katherine, Lookpong, Jackie |
| Red | Anthony, Vicki, Attila, Kyle, Jess, Cika, Deena |

The contestants were tasked with the physical challenge of climbing a cargo net hanging from a large overpass bridge into the river. Halfway up the net was a wooden board with his/her excuse of why he/she was out of shape and unhealthy. Once the contestant climbed up to reach the board, he/she would use a nearby hammer to break through the excuse in order to continue climbing up the cargo net. The Red team won the physical challenge and the Yellow team won the fashion challenge. Vladimir won MVP, for having performed the best in both of the challenges. In contrast, Vicki and Mikey were in the bottom two, both for failing to progress in the competition. In the end, Mikey was the first to be eliminated.

- Most Valuable Player: Vladimir Musson
- Bottom two: Vicki Wheeler & Mikey Gelo
- Eliminated: Mikey Gelonesi
- Featured Photographer: Todd Anthony Tyler

=== Episode 2: Balance ===
| Group | Leader | Members |
|---|---|---|
| Yellow | Anthony | Jackie, Kyle, Marlon, Attila, Katherine |
| Red | Vladimir | Vicki, Lookpong, Deena, Cika, Sam, Jess |

In the physical challenge, the yellow team won. However, the red team won the fashion challenge meaning no one was safe. Jackie won MVP, but Katherine and Anthony struggled in both of the challenges. In the end, Katherine was spared and Anthony was sent home.

- Most Valuable Player: Jackie Zapata
- Bottom two: Anthony Dupree & Katherine Patrick
- Eliminated: Anthony Dupree
- Featured Photographer: Todd Anthony Tyler

=== Episode 3: Pushing Limits ===
| Group | Leader | Members |
|---|---|---|
| Yellow | Jackie | Vicki, Attila, Kyle, Jess, Deena |
| Red | Cika | Marlon, Katherine, Sam, Vladimir, Lookpong |

In the physical challenge, the Red team won. The leader of the losing team, Jackie, had chosen to eliminate Vicky, much to Vicky's dismay. In the fashion challenge, each of the contestants will portray an emotion they had picked. Sam won MVP. Marlon and Katherine were into the bottom two, Marlon for not taking the challenges seriously, while Katherine lacked determination. In the end, Katherine was eliminated in her second appearance in the bottom two.

- Eliminated in Fit challenge: Vicki Wheeler
- Most Valuable Player: Sam Gaskin
- Bottom two: Katherine Patrick & Marlon Dance-Hooi
- Eliminated: Katherine Patrick
- Featured Photographer: Todd Anthony Tyler

=== Episode 4: Fire & Desire ===
| Group | Members |
|---|---|
| Yellow | Jackie, Marlon |
| Red | Deena, Vladimir |
| Blue | Attila, Cika |
| Green | Kyle, Lookpong |
| Purple | Jess, Sam |

Marlon and Jackie won the physical challenge. The prize for the challenge was a lunch with Louise. Sam told Jess that he had lost his wedding ring, much to Sam's dismay. At judging, most of them were given positive feedback, however Lookpong and Atilla were left in the bottom two, Lookpong for being the weakest in the physical challenge and Atilla for having weakest video in the fashion challenge. In a shocking twist, both of them were sent home.

- Most Valuable Player: 4 way tie = Marlon, Jackie, Lookpong, Kyle
- Bottom two: Lookpong Punyabhuti & Attila CK
- Eliminated: Lookpong Punyabhuti & Attila CK
- Featured director: Mackenzie Hunkin

=== Episode 5: Heart & Soul ===
| Group | Leader | Members |
|---|---|---|
| Yellow | Jackie | Cika & Kyle & Vladimir |
| Red | Marlon | Deena & Jess & Sam |

In the physical challenge, Cika dragged the Yellow team down, causing the Yellow team to lose. The prizes for the winning team were letters from their loved ones. In the fashion challenge, everyone struggled. Vladimir and Cika landed in the bottom two, both for lackluster progress in the competition, however no one was sent home.

- Most Valuable Player: None
- Bottom two: Vladimir Musson & Cika Darnadi
- Eliminated: None
- Featured Photographer: Todd Anthony Tyler

=== Episode 6: Be Ready for Anything ===
After elimination, Deena was annoyed by Cika's comment.

| Round | Members Cut |
|---|---|
| First | Kyle & Marlon |
| Second | Jess & Sam |
| Third | Cika & Deena |
| Runner-Up | Jackie |
| Winner of challenge | Vladimir |

In the physical challenge, Kyle was the weakest. The challenge then was won by Vladimir, with Jackie as a close second place.

In fashion challenge, all of them got a makeover in which Kyle hated at first glance. The challenge was body paint while posing. At panel, Deena and Sam were in the bottom two, both for lacking mental strength. Sam was saved, sending Deena home.

- Most Valuable Player: None
- Bottom two: Deena Marzuki & Sam Gaskin
- Eliminated: Deena Marzuki
- Featured Photographer: Todd Anthony Tyler

=== Episode 7: The Test of Time ===
In the physical challenge, contestants were left to cling onto a telephone pole on the beach, switching positions as Louise called out rules. Their foot platform was eventually knocked out from under them, leaving the contestants clinging for dear life using might and strategy. Sam, Jess, Cika, Vladimir, Marlon and Kyle one by one fell as Jackie used wit, leverage, and strategy to come out victorious as the last one on the pole with a time of almost four hours.

In the fashion challenge, Jackie won a one-on-one lesson with photographer, Todd Anthony Tyler. Jackie had the advantage of viewing the set and practicing on site prior to all the other contestants. Jess killed Marilyn Monroe. Marlon and Cika land down bottom 2. Cika eliminated for C-Section pains.

- Most Valuable Player: Jess Punch
- Bottom two: Cika Darnadi & Marlon Dance-Hooi
- Eliminated: Cika Darnadi
- Featured Photographer: Todd Anthony Tyler

=== Episode 8: Putting it Together ===
In the physical challenge, Jess selected Jackie as her partner despite judges reminding her that her goal was to beat Jackie as an opponent. This decision to keep Jackie as her teammate rather than competitor served as advantageous. Jackie and Jess beat the two pairs of men in a challenge that required physical strength, memory, and mental alertness under duress. They were awarded with a day at the spa. In fashion challenge, Jess and Jackie were encouraged to split up their duo and reshuffle pairs for photo shoots to promote a travel brochure for the resort. Jess choose Vladimir, Jackie choose Kyle, while Marlon was paired with Sam. Vladimir and Jackie bottom 2. Vladimir self destructed and announced he was done with his "journey". Jackie made a powerful, heartfelt speech of her accomplishments to date and made a case for her continued transformation.

| Group | Members |
|---|---|
| Yellow | Jackie & Jess |
| Red | Marlon & Vladimir |
| Green | Kyle & Sam |

| Contestants | Places |
|---|---|
| Jackie & Kyle | Golf yard |
| Marlon & Sam | Restaurant |
| Jess& Vladimir | Pool |

- Most Valuable Player: Marlon Dance-Hooi & Sam Gaskin
- Bottom two: Jackie Zapata & Vladimir Musson
- Eliminated: Vladimir Musson
- Featured Photographer: Todd Anthony Tyler

=== Episode 9: Metamorphosis ===
The physical challenge of episode 9 was themed Metamorphosis. Contestants were tied up in a sleeping bag cocoon and hoisted up by their feet the hang inside down. Upon the buzzer, contestants were instructed to do 20 sit ups in the air, lower down, then crawl up a hill as they were tied up in the cocoon. After unzipping themselves from the sleeping bags using hooks in the ground and no hands, the contestants proceeded on a timed obstacle course with delayed starts based on their phase 1 finishing times. Contestants crawled through web obstacles, gathered letter boards, jumped to retrieve a hanging scroll, solve a riddle and use their letters to hang up the riddle's answer, then climb up a six-story tower using j-hook and harness ropes to a platform from where he/she would zipline down to the initial starting point while yelling his/her descriptive word.

| Group | Members | Order | Title | Time | Finished |
|---|---|---|---|---|---|
| Yellow | Jackie | 3 | Limitless | 5:54 | Winner |
| Red | Sam | 4 | Deserving | 10:07 | 4th |
| Blue | Jess | 2 | Beautiful | 10:16 | 5th |
| Green | Kyle | 1 | Maturing | 6:53 | 3rd |
| Purple | Marlon | 5 | Memorable | 6:34 | 2nd |

In physical, Jess slowest in time and choose beautiful. Jackie beat out Marlon and Sam despite their 30-second time advantages. Jackie's word was LIMITLESS.

In fashion challenge, Marlon struggle because lost.

In elimination, 4 votes for Jess, while Marlon no votes, he will be eliminated, much to Marlon dismay and lost. He will not go to Singapore runway.

- Most Valuable Player: None
- Final Four: Jackie Zapata, Kyle Ramirez, Sam Gaskin, Jess Punch
- Bottom Two: Jess Punch & Marlon Dance-Hooi
- Eliminated: Marlon Dance-Hooi
- Featured Photographer: Todd Anthony Tyler

=== Episode 10: The Final Push ===
The final physical training, Jackie stronger than others. The physical challenge was a multi-day obstacle course representing their transformations - Past, Present, and Future. The 4 would start by rowing through mazes of marsh water on sampan boats to retrieve rope. They then would row back to an area to recover life sized portraits of their old selves in the water. After diving in and recovering their posters, they would row to a wall, use the rope to lasso a log on the hillside to pull themselves up onto a road. They would then run 2 km up a mountain carrying life-sized portraits of their old selves to the mountain summit. Here they abandoned their old selves, shed the baggage, and ran through a door that led them to open water. After running through the door, the contestants ran over 20 floating platforms that led from the middle of the ones to the shore line. On the shore lay hundreds of colored shells. Each contestant had to find and collect his or her colored shells and open them to find 8 photo boards and letters, which, when unscrambled, spelled a word descriptive of their current, transformed selves. Once unscrambled, the contestants ran up shore to a kayak, where they jumped in and rowed to a distant island. On the far away island lay huge 3 ft x 3 ft triangular blocks that, when stacked like puzzle pieces, formed a 7 ft three-sided column of photos of their transformative journey. During the challenge, Jackie lost her boat, paving a clear opportunity for Sam to take over first place and Kyle second. Jackie was third and Jess as last place in danger of elimination. In the end, Jackie steadily cut at her ga with Kyle and overtook the two men in the final puzzle stage by utilizing strategy. She sorted the puzzle pieces into three piles: head, torso and feet, to facilitate the puzzle building. Jackie crossed through the final door to Singapore in first place. Kyle took second. And Sam inched out Jess in a battle for third and final place. Sadly, Jess was confronted with a door that didn't open to the Singapore finale... but she shared words of wisdom that summed up her journey..."I open my own doors and create my own opportunities for growth." Jackie is the last girl standing.

| Group | Members | Order | Title | Time | Finished |
|---|---|---|---|---|---|
| Yellow | Jackie | 1 | Stunning | Arrived Singapore | Winner |
| Purple | Kyle | 2 | Sculpted | Arrived Singapore | Runner-Up |
| Red | Sam | 3 | Powerful | Arrived Singapore | 3rd |
| Blue | Jess | 4 | Graceful | Did not arrived | Eliminated |

At fashion challenge, the final 3 were tasked with a photoshoot to appear on the cover of Fitness First Magazine. The second part of the fashion challenge was the much awaited Singapore Digital Fashion Week, where the three walked the runway as guest models for TIFA Fashion Show. Each had an opportunity to share a self-created video clip about his/her journey, describing their life-changing experience. Louise, Smith & Todd were there to announce the winner of season 2. In the end, Jackie was the winner of Fit For Fashion season 2 with 6 weeks of first place physical challenges, 2 weeks in second place, and 2 other weeks as team captain. #GOUSA

- Bottom Two: Sam Gaskin & Jess Punch
- Eliminated: Jess Punch
- Final Three: Sam Gaskin, Kyle Ramirez, Jackie Zapata
- Winner: Jackie Zapata
- Featured Photographer: Todd Anthony Tyler

== Challenges ==
| Contestant | 1 | 2 | 3 | 4 | 5 | 6 | 7 | 8 | 9 | 10 | |
|---|---|---|---|---|---|---|---|---|---|---|---|
| Jackie | SAFE | WIN | SAFE | WIN | SAFE | SAFE | SAFE | LOW | WIN | WIN | WINNER |
| Kyle | SAFE | SAFE | SAFE | WIN | SAFE | SAFE | SAFE | SAFE | SAFE | SAFE | RUNNER-UP |
| Sam | SAFE | SAFE | WIN | SAFE | SAFE | LOW | SAFE | WIN | SAFE | LOW | RUNNER-UP |
| Jess | SAFE | SAFE | SAFE | SAFE | SAFE | SAFE | WIN | SAFE | LOW | OUT | |
| Marlon | SAFE | SAFE | LOW | WIN | SAFE | SAFE | LOW | WIN | OUT | | |
| Vladimir | WIN | SAFE | SAFE | SAFE | LOW | SAFE | SAFE | OUT | | | |
| Cika | SAFE | SAFE | SAFE | SAFE | LOW | SAFE | OUT | | | | |
| Deena | SAFE | SAFE | SAFE | SAFE | SAFE | OUT | | | | | |
| Attila | SAFE | SAFE | SAFE | OUT | | | | | | | |
| Lookpong | SAFE | SAFE | SAFE | OUT | | | | | | | |
| Katherine | SAFE | LOW | OUT | | | | | | | | |
| Vicki | LOW | SAFE | OUT | | | | | | | | |
| Anthony | SAFE | OUT | | | | | | | | | |
| Mikey | OUT | | | | | | | | | | |

The contestant won Fit for Fashion.
The contestant was a runner-up on Fit for Fashion.
The contestant won a challenge that week.
The contestant was at risk for elimination.
The contestant was eliminated outside of judging panel.
The contestant lost and was eliminated from the competition.
