= The Apartment - Rising Stars =

Fifth season of the design show The Apartment

- The Apartment - Rising Stars
- No. of episodes: 10

Release
- Original network: Sony Channel; AXN
- Original release: March 18 – May 20, 2017

Season chronology
- ← Previous; Season 4 Next → Season 6

The Apartment: Rising Stars Edition is the fifth season of reality show competition The Apartment which after six seasons is the longest running reality competition television show in Asia. The contestants are 12 up-and-coming interior designers competing to win $100,000. Its judges are Laurence Llewelyn-Bowen, Jamie Durie (who also hosts), and Genevieve Gorder.

== Contestants ==
Contestants	Profession	From	Finish	Place
Paul Nagaoka	Actor / House Flipper	Singapore	Episode 1	12
Khaled Mahallati	Design Company Owner	Indonesia	Episode 2	11
Cara Ditta-In	Club Manager / Freelance Designer	Thailand	Episode 4	10
Naya	Radio DJ / Freelance Designer	Philippines	Episode 5	9
Ben Woodbury	Interior Designer	Australia	Episode 6	8
Beck Kowalski	Real Estate Agent / Stylist	Australia	Episode 7	7-6
Ernest Loh	Interior Designer	Malaysia	Episode 7	7-6
Kamille Nassif	Model / Design School Student	Thailand	Episode 8	5
Andres Luer	Interior Designer	China	Episode 9	4-3
Ally Marrotte	Interior Designer	Australia	Episode 9	4-3
Winston See	Architect	Malaysia	Episode 10	2
Aleksandra Flasz	Model / Design School Graduate	Poland	Episode 10	1

== Episodes ==
No.	Title	Guest judge(s)	Winner	Eliminated	Original release date
1	"A Star Is Born"	Andrea Savage and Jeremy Rowe	Red Team	Paul Nagaoka	March 18, 2017
2	"Working for a Living...Room"	Jeremy Rowe	Red Team	Khaled Mahallati	March 25, 2017
3	"Where Dem Girls At?"	Cameron Woo	Red Team	None	April 1, 2017
Bottom two: Ally and Cara.
4	"Home Work"	None	Yellow Team	Cara Ditta-In	April 8, 2017
Bottom 2: Andres and Ben. Cara is eliminated because she is struggling.
5	"Courtesy Flushed"	Annie Sim and Nadya Hutagalung	Red Team	Naya	April 15, 2017
Bottom 3: Aleksandra, Beck and Naya.
6	"Out Standing in their Field"	Elliot Barratt and Maya Karin	Red Team	Ben Woodley	April 22, 2017
7	"Not Kidding Around"	Cameron Woo	Red Team	Beck Kowalski; Ernest Loh	April 29, 2017
Bottom two: Beck and Ernest.
8	"Never Say Dine!"	None	Red Team	Kamille Nassif	May 6, 2017
9	"Extreme Re-makeover"	Tristan Butterfield	Red Team	Ally Marrotte; Andres Luer	May 13, 2017
10	TBA	None	Aleksandra Flasz	Winston See	May 20, 2017
After mastering 5 rooms in a row, Aleksandra and Andres take a win, giving Aleks $100,000 and the Rising Star title.

== Teams ==
Episode	Team		
Episode	Colour	Captain	Members
1	Red	Andres	Ben, Aleksandra
1	Blue	Ernest	Beck, Naya
1	Yellow	Ally	Winston, Cara
1	Green	Paul	Kamille, Khaled
2	Red	Andres	Ben, Aleksandra
2	Blue	Ernest	Beck, Naya
2	Yellow	Ally	Winston, Cara
2	Green	Khaled	Kamille
3&4	Blue	Ben	Kamille, Ally
3&4	Red	Andres	Ernest, Winston
3&4	Yellow	Aleksandra	Beck, Cara, Naya
5	Blue	Ben	Kamille, Ally
5	Red	Andres	Ernest, Winston
5	Yellow	Aleksandra	Beck, Naya
6	Blue	Beck	Ernest, Ben
6	Yellow	Kamille	Andres
6	Red	Winston	Ally, Aleksandra
7	Blue	Beck	Ernest
7	Yellow	Kamille	Andres
7	Red	Winston	Ally, Aleksandra
8	Yellow	Kamille	Andres
8	Red	Winston	Ally, Aleksandra
9	Yellow	Andres	Ally
9	Red	Winston	Aleksandra
10	None	Aleksandra	Andres
10	None	Winston	Ally

== Elimination ==
Elimination Chart
Contestant	1	2	3	4	5	6	7	8	9	10
(Vietnam) Aleksandra	WIN	WIN	IN	WIN	LOW	WIN	WIN	WIN	WIN	WINNER
(Malaysia) Winston	LOW	IN	WIN	IN	WIN	WIN	WIN	WIN	WIN	RUNNER-UP
(Australia) Ally	LOW	IN	LOW	IN	IN	WIN	WIN	WIN	OUT	
(China) Andres	WIN	WIN	WIN	LOW	WIN	IN	IN	LOW	OUT	
(Thailand) Kamille	LOW	LOW	IN	IN	IN	LOW	IN	OUT		
(Australia) Beck	IN	IN	IN	WIN	LOW	IN	OUT			
(Malaysia) Ernest	IN	IN	WIN	IN	WIN	IN	OUT			
(Australia) Ben	WIN	WIN	IN	LOW	IN	OUT				
(Philippines) Naya	IN	IN	IN	WIN	OUT					
(Thailand) Cara	LOW	IN	LOW	OUT						
(Indonesia) Khaled	LOW	OUT								
(Singapore) Paul	OUT									

The contestant won The Apartment - Rising Stars Edition.
The contestant was the runner-up on The Apartment - Rising Stars Edition.
The contestant won that challenge.
The contestant was in the bottom 3 but ultimately safe.
The contestant was in the bottom 2 but ultimately safe.
The contestant withdrew.
The contestant was eliminated from the competition.
