= Jody Rigby =

Australian gardener and television personality

- Born: Jody Rigby; 1976 (age 49–50); Australia
- Notable work: Backyard Blitz

Comedy career
- Years active: 2000–present

Jody Rigby is an Australian horticulturist and television personality, often appearing on gardening programs.

== Career ==
Rigby began her television career on the Nine Network's Backyard Blitz in 2000, where she remained until the show finished in early 2008. The show was popular and it won six Logies. In 2008, she moved to the Seven Network to appear on The Outdoor Room, along with Jamie Durie, who also was a part of Backyard Blitz. In 2009 she hosted Garden Angels alongside Melissa King and Linda Ross on Foxtel's Lifestyle channel.

Rigby appeared on the cover of Ralph magazine in September 2004. She released a book, 150 Indestructible Plants, in 2010.
