= Fit for Fashion season 1 =

Fit for Fashion
- Season 1
- Fit for Fashion
- No. of episodes: 10

Release
- Original network: STAR World
- Original release: October 16 – December 18, 2014

Season chronology
- Next → Season 2

Fit for Fashion is an English reality television series hosted by actress Louise Roe and fashion Photographer Todd Anthony Tyler. Season one features fitness trainers Christine Bullock and Mitch Chilson as they guide contestants through numerous challenges. The show's first season was filmed in Malaysia, in the state of Terengganu.

The winner of the competition receives $100,000, a feature on the cover of Fitness First magazine, and an all-expense shopping spree in London.

== Contestants ==
Name	Age	Hashtag	Title	Residence	Results
Hema Lata Veerasamy	25	#F4FHema	Doctor Campus	Malaysia	Eliminated in Episode 1
Andrew McCarthy	26	#F4FAndrew	Amateur Model	Hong Kong	Eliminated in Episode 2
Fred Burnard	36	#F4FFred	Islander	Philippines	Eliminated in Episode 3
Ming Wolf	19	#F4FMing	Meek Ming	Singapore	Eliminated in Episode 4
Rusty Thompson	32	#F4FRusty	The Ex-Military Man	United States	Eliminated in Episode 5
Chelsey Hall	27	#F4FChelsey	Wild Child	Philippines	Eliminated in Episode 6
Shiva Nithiabala	37	#F4FShiva	Business Man	Malaysia	Eliminated in Episode 8
Jerald Foo	27	#F4FJerald	Expressive Joker	Singapore	Eliminated in Episode 9
Vanessa Ammann	25	#F4FVanessa	Dark Horse	Philippines	Eliminated in Episode 10
Matthew 'Matty' Kosub	28	#F4FMatty	Mr. Nice Guy	Australia	Runners-up
Kristina Pakhomova	23	#F4FKristina	The Russian Diva	Russia	Runners-up
Citira Corrigan	33	#F4FCitira	The Sexy Momma	Australia	Winner

== Episode Synopsis ==
=== Episode 1: The Raw Material ===
First aired October 16, 2014

Contestants arrived at Tanjong Jara Resort on Malaysia's East Coast. Split into two teams, they must build a raft and reach a fishing boat to retrieve props for their first beach fashion challenge.

Group	Leader	Members
Yellow	Chelsey	Citira, Kristina, Matty, & Shiva
Dark Green	Fred	Andrew, Hema, Jerald, Ming & Vanessa

Fairly early in the challenge, it is apparent that one team has taken a big lead. The losing team blame each other.

- Most Valuable Player: Chelsey Hall
- Bottom two: Hema Lata Veerasamy & Rusty
- Eliminated: Hema Lata Veerasamy
- Featured Photographer: Todd Anthony Tyler

=== Episode 2: Confidence is Key ===
First aired October 23, 2014

Contestants faced a new challenge. They climbed up a waterfall wall. Chelsey Hall, previously the Most Valuable Player, picks her team members. She faces an additional challenge of picking a strategic team.

Group	Members
Yellow	Andrew, Chelsey, Citira, Fred, & Ming
Red	Jerald, Kristina, Matty, Shiva & Vanessa

The contestants posed for a celebrity photographer. Having underestimated the difficulty of the challenges, tensions grow among the contestants. Vanessa's swimming receives attention, as a 'Mermaid Coach'.

- Most Valuable Player: N/A
- Bottom two: Andrew McCarthy & Ming Wolf
- Eliminated: Andrew McCarthy
- Featured Photographer: Todd Anthony Tyler

=== Episode 3: Mind Over Matter ===
- Most Valuable Player: Jerald Foo
- Bottom two: Fred Burnard & Shiva Nithiabala
- Eliminated: Fred Burnard
- Featured Photographer: N/A

=== Episode 4: Movement Matters ===
- Most Valuable Player: Citira Corrigan
- Bottom two: N/A
- Eliminated: Ming Wolf

=== Episode 5: Commitment ===
- Most Valuable Player: N/A
- Bottom two: Shiva Nithiabala & Rusty
- Eliminated: Rusty

=== Episode 6: Endurance Rules ===
- Most Valuable Player: N/A
- Bottom two: N/A
- Eliminated: Chelsey Hall
- Featured Photographer: Todd Anthony Tyler

=== Episode 7: Power Plays ===
- Most Valuable Player: N/A
- Bottom two: N/A
- Eliminated: None.
- Featured Photographer: Todd Anthony Tyler

=== Episode 8: Discovery From Within ===
Kristina teams up with one of the strongest players in the competition. The contestants get flirty during a photoshoot.

- Most Valuable Player: N/A
- Bottom two: Shiva Nithiabala & Vanessa Ammann
- Eliminated: Shiva Nithiabala
- Featured Photographer: Todd Anthony Tyler

=== Episode 9: Trust Is A Two Way Street ===
- Most Valuable Player: N/A
- Bottom two: N/A
- Eliminated: Jerald Foo
- Featured Photographer: Todd Anthony Tyler

=== Episode 10: The Journey To Win ===
- Top 3 : Matthew 'Matty' Kosub, Kristina Pakhomova & Citira Corrigan
- Eliminated: Vanessa Ammann
- Winner: Citira Corrigan
- Featured Photographer: Todd Anthony Tyler, Zandra Rhodes

== Results ==
Contestant	Episodes										
Contestant	1	2	3	4	5	6	7	8	9	10	
Physical; Challenge; Winner	Andrew, Fred, Hema, Jerald, Ming, Vanessa	Jerald, Kristina, Matty, Shiva, Vanessa	Citira, Jerald	Citira, Chelsey, Rusty, Shiva	Citira, Jerald, Shiva, Vanessa	Matty	Matty	Kristina, Matty	Kristina	—	—
Citira	SAFE	SAFE	SAFE	WIN	SAFE	SAFE	SAFE	SAFE	SAFE	LOW	WINNER
Matty	SAFE	IMM	SAFE	SAFE	SAFE	SAFE	SAFE	SAFE	SAFE	SAFE	RUNNER-UP
Kristina	IMM	IMM	SAFE	SAFE	LOW	SAFE	SAFE	SAFE	SAFE	SAFE	RUNNER-UP
Vanessa	SAFE	IMM	SAFE	SAFE	SAFE	SAFE	LOW	LOW	LOW	OUT	
Jerald	SAFE	IMM	WIN	SAFE	SAFE	SAFE	SAFE	SAFE	OUT		
Shiva	SAFE	IMM	LOW	LOW	SAFE	SAFE	LOW	OUT			
Chelsey	WIN	SAFE	SAFE	SAFE	SAFE	OUT					
Rusty	LOW	SAFE	SAFE	SAFE	OUT						
Ming	IMM	LOW	SAFE	OUT							
Fred	SAFE	SAFE	OUT								
Andrew	SAFE	OUT									
Hema	OUT										
