= Fit for Fashion =

Reality television series

- Show logo
- Starring: Louise Roe; Todd Anthony Tyler; Christine Bullock; Mitch Chilson
- Opening theme: "I Will Survive" - Ryan Star
- Country of origin: Asia
- No. of seasons: 2
- No. of episodes: 20

Original release
- Network: Star World
- Release: October 16, 2014 – March 10, 2016

Fit for Fashion was a reality TV show on STAR World hosted by Louise Roe, with fashion photographer Todd Anthony Tyler. The show featured fitness trainers Christine Bullock and Mitch Chilson. The first season of the show was filmed in Malaysia. The state of Terrenganu was the primary filming location and the location of the contestants' residence for season one. The second season was filmed in Bintan Lagoon Resort, Indonesia.

== Series overview ==
Season	Season premiere date	Winner	Runner-up	No. of finalists	Destination(s)
1	October 16, 2014	Citira Corrigan	Matty Kosub; Kristina Pakhomova	12	(Malaysia); Terrenganu; Kuala Lumpur
2	January 7, 2016	Jackie Zapata	Kyle Ramirez; Sam Gaskin	14	(Indonesia); Bintan Island Singapore
