= The Apartment season 1 =

The Apartment
- Season 1
- No. of episodes: 8

Release
- Original network: STAR World
- Original release: October 27 – December 15, 2011

Season chronology
- Next → Season 2

The Apartment (Season 1) is the first season of the Asian reality television show The Apartment created by Riaz Mehta and produced by Singapore-based Imagine Group, which has recently been dissolved, consisting of five seasons and 68 episodes. It is currently the longest running show, of the interior design genre in Asia. It stars proficient interior designers.

== The Concept (The idea) ==
The concept of the first season was to make three teams cooperate to design one room each week for eight weeks. The host of the programme, Kahi Lee, issued the challenge and set up the panel of judges featuring Martin Haeger and Alice Nguyen by whom their finished work was to be judged. The victors were announced after the last episode, and earned their very own apartment, given by the Quarza- KL East company in Kuala Lumpur.

== Contestants ==
Syed Wafa and Rodrigo (housemates), the prizewinners of the season;

Jeremy and Renai (couple); and

Michael and Artika (friends)
