= The Apartment - Design Your Destiny =

Third season of the reality design show The Apartment

- No. of episodes: 10

Release
- Original network: STAR World
- Original release: September 29 – December 1, 2013

Season chronology
- ← Previous; Season 2 Next → Season 4

The Apartment - Design Your Destiny is the third season of The Apartment, a reality television show which is the longest running reality competition television show in Asia. The concept is that nine teams compete in an interior designing show hosted by Jamie Durie, and judged by both him and Laurence Llewelyn-Bowen. Designed as a pressure stress test, teams will design and decorate a room each week. At the end of the challenge, the winner will walk away with a brand new double-storey home at Elmina, Malaysia. This reality television show is created by Riaz Mehta and produced by Imagine Group.

Deankie and Tiara from the Philippines were declared the winners in this season.

== Contestants ==
Contestants	Relationship	About them
Azaria and Adriana	Friends	Azaria Tagaya (28) is a Malaysian voice over talent Adriana Thani-Caldwell (27) is a Malaysian lecturer.
Priyanka and Vineet	Married	Priyanka Porwal (28) is pursuing her dreams of being an actress from Singapore. Vineet Jain (32) is a marketing manager from Singapore.
April and Jen	Friends	April Marie (late 20s) is a media director from Great Britain. Jen Bradfield (23) is an events manager from Malaysia.
Sarah and Brian	Siblings	Sarah Chen (24) is a Malaysian internal consultant. Brian Chen (27) is a Malaysian chef.
Ines and Jennifer	Friends	Ines Putri (23) is an Indonesian golf athlete and Miss Indonesia 2012, Top 15 Miss World 2012 Jennifer Sumia (24) is an Indonesian fresh graduate and the 2nd Runner-up in Miss Indonesia 2012.
Adam and Adrian	Friends	Adam Lundberg (26) is a model from America. Adrian Khoo (mid 20s) is born in Malaysia.
Pearlyn and Nara	Friends	Pearlyn Koh (25) is a DJ from Singapore. Nara Chompunich (34) is an emcee from Thailand.
Yvette and Sonya	Friends	Yvette King (29) is a fashion reporter/blogger from Singapore. Sonya Davison (22) is a model/actress from Singapore.
Deankie and Tiara	Friends	Deankie Delima Latonio (23) and Tiara Sison (23) have been friends since they were Art students. Both are Filipinos.

== Episodes ==
No.	Title	Guest judge(s)	Winner	Eliminated	Original release date
1	"Back, Bigger and Better than Ever"	Andrea Savage	Yvette and Sonya	Azaria and Adriana	September 29, 2013
The first challenge, with the theme "Romance", involved the decoration of the master bedroom. Teams were given 15 hours to complete the challenge. Impressing the judges with their polished and sleek design style, Yvette and Sonya won this challenge. Bottom Two: Azaria and Adriana, Pearlyn and Nara.
2	"Design Boot Camp"	Raven Tao	Ines and Jennifer	Priyanka and Vineet	October 6, 2013
The second challenge involved the designing of the bathroom. Several themes from various eras ranging from "the roaring 20s", and "the Hollywood 50s" to "the groovy 60s" were given, from which teams had to choose one. Teams were given 12 hours to complete the challenge. Injecting their unique personalities into their design, beauty queens Ines and Jennifer won this challenge. Bottom Two: Priyanka and Vineet, April and Jen.
3	"Lights, camera, action"	Eddy Tan; Sun Young Moon	Yvette and Sonya, Pearlyn and Nara	April and Jen	October 13, 2013
The third challenge involved the creation of an entertainment room that was "worthy of accommodating their favourite superstar". The design had to incorporate one of these few characteristics given: boldness, sophistication, chic, trend setting, attitude and versatility. Teams were given 15 hours to complete the challenge. This challenge came with a twist: Yvette and Sonya split their prizes with fellow competitors, Nara and Pearlyn. Bottom Two: Sarah and Brian, April and Jen.
4	"The Only Leonardo I Know Is A Ninja Turtle"	Andrea Savage	Deankie and Tiara	Adam and Adrian (saved)	October 20, 2013
The fourth challenge involved embodying the style of an iconic artist, drawing inspiration from their work, and designing the living room. For this challenge, teams must work with their neighbours, and decide on the work allocation. Teams were given 15 hours to complete the challenge. This challenge ended with a pleasant surprise: there would be no elimination this week. Adam and Adrian were saved from elimination by Jamie. Bottom Two: Ines and Jennifer, Adam and Adrian.
5	"I Hate The Outdoors and The Outdoors Hates Me"	Iva and Phillippe	Adam and Adrian	Sarah and Brian	October 27, 2013
The fifth challenge was for teams to work on the garden. Teams had to consider including elements of privacy, relaxation and enjoyment when designing the garden. Also, their gardens' designs had to allow for growing of fruits and vegetables. Teams were given 17 hours to complete the challenge. Given their close shave last week, Adam and Adrian sprung back and won the challenge, where they enjoyed dinner and drinks with Ines and Jennifer (of whom they selected), as well as having additional funds for the next challenge - $2,000 taken from Deankie and Tiara's budget. Bottom Two: Pearlyn and Nara, Sarah and Brian.
6	"Borderline Evil Genius"	Jeremy Rowe	Deankie and Tiara	Ines and Jennifer	November 3, 2013
The sixth challenge involved teams creating a family room, where children appeared as "clients" to give teams a design brief and join them for shopping. The children also helped the judges during deliberation. The family room must creatively cater for 3 generations, and exemplify the whole idea of a family. Teams were given 15 hours to complete the challenge. Despite having a budget smaller than the others, Deankie and Tiara stood up to the challenge and emerged victorious in this challenge. Bottom Two: Ines and Jennifer, Adam and Adrian.
7	"One Man's Trash is Another Person's Treasure"	Alice Nguyen	Deankie and Tiara, Pearlyn and Nara	Adam and Adrian (saved)	November 10, 2013
The seventh challenge involved teams creating a guest bedroom "fit for a queen", under a budget of $2,000. At the start of the show, teams were given a cryptic clue, to which the answer was April and Jen's room. Pairs Yvette and Sonya and Pearlyn and Nara found the "treasure" - Laurence's personal collection. Teams were given 15 hours to complete the challenge. Both Deankie and Tiara emerged as winners of this challenge, winning their third challenge in the show, with Pearlyn and Nara sharing the winning title with them. Bottom Two: Yvette and Sonya, Adam and Adrian.
8	"Go Out with a Big Bang"	Andrea Savage	Yvette and Sonya; Deankie and Tiara	Adam and Adrian; Pearlyn and Nara	November 18, 2013
This week's challenge is the most intimidating challenge to date, as not only did the teams have to showcase their personality through their designs of the kitchen and dining areas, they had to complement their designs with personal items that are delivered from home. With all the teams stepping up to the game and delivering possibly their best designs to date, the judges had a difficult decision on their hands. Bottom Two: Adam and Adrian, Pearlyn and Nara.
9	"An Emotional Roller Coaster"	None	None	None	November 24, 2013
This week, The Apartment takes a trip down memory lane and looks back at the stand out moments thus far this season. Outrageous, hilarious never before seen footage of the vibrant contestants and the pristine judges will also be featured.
10	"What We'd Do for an Apartment"	Andrea Savage	Deankie and Tiara	Yvette and Sonya	December 1, 2013
This stage is set as the last two teams standing battle it out for their dream home. Yvette & Sonya and Deankie & Tiara take on a mammoth final challenge of completing an entire apartment from scratch in just 72 hours! Not only do they have to please the judges, they also have to impress VIP guests in an open house party. The stakes are at their highest.

== Elimination ==
Elimination Chart
Contestant	1	2	3	4	5	6	7	8	10
(Philippines) Deankie & Tiara	SAFE	SAFE	SAFE	WIN	SAFE	WIN	WIN	WIN	WINNER
(Singapore) Yvette & Sonya	WIN	SAFE	WIN	SAFE	SAFE	SAFE	BTM 2	WIN	RUNNER-UP
(Singapore) (Thailand) Pearlyn & Nara	BTM 2	SAFE	WIN	SAFE	BTM 2	SAFE	WIN	ELIM	
(United States) (Malaysia) Adam & Adrian	SAFE	SAFE	SAFE	ELIM	WIN	BTM 2	ELIM	ELIM	
(Indonesia) Ines & Jennifer	SAFE	WIN	SAFE	BTM 2	SAFE	ELIM			
(Malaysia) Brian & Sarah	SAFE	SAFE	BTM 2	SAFE	ELIM				
(United Kingdom) (Malaysia) April & Jen	SAFE	BTM 2	ELIM						
(Singapore) Vineet & Priyanka	SAFE	ELIM							
(Malaysia) Adriana & Azaria	ELIM								

The pair won The Apartment - Design Your Destiny.
The pair was the runner-up on The Apartment - Design Your Destiny.
The pair won that challenge.
The pair were in the bottom 2 but ultimately safe.
The pair was saved after being eliminated from the competition.
The pair was eliminated from the competition.
