= The Outdoor Room =

- Genre: Lifestyle/Travel
- Presented by: Jamie Durie
- Country of origin: Australia
- Original language: English
- No. of seasons: 1
- No. of episodes: 10

Production
- Executive producer: Michael Hauser
- Running time: 22 minutes

Original release
- Network: Seven Network
- Release: 31 August – 30 November 2008

The Outdoor Room is an Australian lifestyle television program hosted by Jamie Durie on the Seven Network in 2008 with repeats broadcast on 7Two. The Outdoor Room is a backyard improvement show that saw Durie design a new backyard for a worthy family, similar to his previous show Backyard Blitz. He was seen travelling to various countries around the world to seek inspiration and gain new ideas before coming home to start work on the design with his team. Along with reuniting with former Backyard Blitz horticulturist Jody Rigby, each week Durie was also joined by a prominent Australian chef who serves up a dish from each episode's country of inspiration.

It did not return for a second season due to budgetary constraints to produce each episode but an American version of the show was produced. HGTV picked up the series with Jamie Durie, produced by Scout Productions, Emmy Award-winning producers of Queer Eye for the Straight Guy. Running for four seasons and 52 episodes, the series was produced by showrunner Michael Hauser.

== Episodes ==
No.	Inspiration	Original airdate	Ratings
1	Italy	31 August 2008	1,291,000
2	United Kingdom	7 September 2008	1,356,000
3	Africa	14 September 2008	1,187,000
4	India	21 September 2008	920,000
5	Bali	28 September 2008	1,047,000
6	Japan	26 October 2008	985,000
7	France	2 November 2008	1,005,000
8	Egypt	9 November 2008	1,028,000
9	Thailand	16 November 2008	963,000
10	Mexico	30 November 2008	912,000

Ratings are based on the average of the total ratings for Australian mainland capital cities.
This episode was a one-hour series premiere.
This episode aired half an hour later at 7pm due to a Seven News special in its regular timeslot.

== See also ==
- List of programs broadcast by Seven Network
- List of Australian television series
