= Plain Jane (TV series) =

- Genre: Reality
- Presented by: Louise Roe
- Country of origin: United States
- Original language: English
- No. of seasons: 3
- No. of episodes: 24

Production
- Executive producers: Allison Grodner; Amy Palmer; Rich Meehan
- Running time: 42 minutes
- Production companies: Fly on the Wall Entertainment; Sony Pictures Television

Original release
- Network: The CW
- Release: July 28 – September 1, 2010
- Network: MTV
- Release: October 19, 2011 – 2014

Plain Jane is an American reality television series that transforms one woman each week. The series debuted on July 28, 2010, on The CW. Despite the series not being renewed by its original network, Sony Pictures Television worked with MTV to produce a second season. An 8-episode second season was greenlit and aired in October 2011.

It was announced in May 2013 that the Style Network would be airing the second season starting on June 3, 2013, but the series has since been removed from the schedule.

The series was renewed for a third season of 12 episodes, which aired in 2014.

== Format ==
Each week, British fashion expert Louise Roe, acting like a "fairy godmother", takes one 'Plain Jane' and transforms her inside and out with confidence-building challenges and a head-to-toe makeover. It culminates when she reveals her secret crush to the person of her dreams on a romantic date.

== Episodes ==
=== Season 1 (2010) ===
The first season of Plain Jane included 6 one-hour episodes. It premiered on July 28, 2010, and finished its first season on September 1, 2010.

No. overall	No. in season	Title	Original release date	U.S. viewers (millions)
1	1	"Friend Zone Jane"	July 28, 2010	0.98
2	2	"No Risk Jane"	August 4, 2010	1.11
3	3	"Do Over Jane"	August 11, 2010	1.23
4	4	"Wallflower Jane"	August 18, 2010	1.33
5	5	"Conservative Jane"	August 25, 2010	1.13
6	6	"Jane Plus"	September 1, 2010	1.00

=== Season 2 (2011) ===
Season 2 premiered on MTV UK on October 19, 2011.

No. overall	No. in season	Title	Original release date
7	1	"Episode 1"	October 19, 2011
Louise Roe transforms Gaya from Australia.
8	2	"Episode 2"	October 26, 2011
Louise Roe transforms Natalie.
9	3	"Episode 3"	November 2, 2011
Louise Roe transforms Sarah.
10	4	"Episode 4"	November 9, 2011
Louise Roe transforms Jade from Cardiff, Wales.
11	5	"Episode 5"	November 16, 2011
Louise Roe transforms Jamie from Chicago.
12	6	"Episode 6"	November 23, 2011
Louise Roe transforms Sobi.
13	7	"Episode 7"	November 30, 2011
Louise Roe transforms Lucy.
14	8	"Episode 8"	December 7, 2011
Louise Roe transforms Liz.
