= Backyard Blitz =

- title card
- Genre: Lifestyle
- Created by: Don Burke
- Developed by: CTC Productions
- Presented by: Jamie Durie
- Starring: Team Members; Scott Cam; Jody Rigby; Nigel Ruck
- Country of origin: Australia
- Original language: English
- No. of seasons: 7
- No. of episodes: 159

Production
- Producers: Don Burke; Jamie Durie; Rick Spence
- Running time: 43–44 minutes

Original release
- Network: Nine Network
- Release: 9 April 2000 – 16 September 2007

Backyard Blitz is a Logie Award winning Australian lifestyle and DIY television program that aired on the Nine Network from 2000 to 2007. It was hosted by Jamie Durie and was created by Don Burke and produced by his CTC Productions team.

== Overview ==
The show featured a very similar premise to the show Ground Force, in which a team of gardeners employed by the show descend on a supposedly worthy individual's place and improve the garden for the cameras within a specified time limit. This similarity led to legal action being taken by the rival Seven Network, which at the time was set to debut an Australian version of Ground Force. Seven ultimately lost its claim as Don Burke's CTC was able to argue that Burke's previous program Burke's Backyard had featured backyard garden renovations, which they claimed naturally morphed into the Backyard Blitz concept.

The four regular presenters on the show were landscaper Jamie Durie (the main host and the show's lead landscaper), Scott Cam (builder/carpenter), Nigel Ruck (landscaper) and Jody Rigby (horticulturist). The show launched the television careers of Durie, Rigby and Cam. Durie and Cam later become hosts of Nine's successful reality television show The Block during different seasons.

During its run the show was immensely popular across all demographics; it regularly won its time slot and consistently ranked in the top 20 national shows at year's end. On 14 November 2006 Backyard Blitz was axed by the Nine Network after seven years on air. Don Burke, whose own show Burke's Backyard was broadcast by Nine for nearly 18 years before it was axed in 2004, said his production company was "quite shocked by this decision". In mid-2007 Nine aired the six remaining unaired episodes that were filmed before the show was cancelled.

In 2008, Nine started airing a spin-off show called Domestic Blitz, hosted by Cam and Shelley Craft. The show lasted until 2010, encompassing 4 seasons.

== Awards ==
During the show's run, Backyard Blitz was nominated for, and won, several Logie Awards. The show won six consecutive 'Most Popular Lifestyle Program' awards (2002–2006), and was nominated in the same category in 2007 but lost. Jamie Durie won the 'Most Popular New Male Talent' in 2001 and was nominated for 'Most Popular TV Presenter' in 2005 and 2006 for his role on the show.

== See also ==
- List of longest-running Australian television series
- List of Australian television series
- Mucking In
