= Miss USA 2010 =

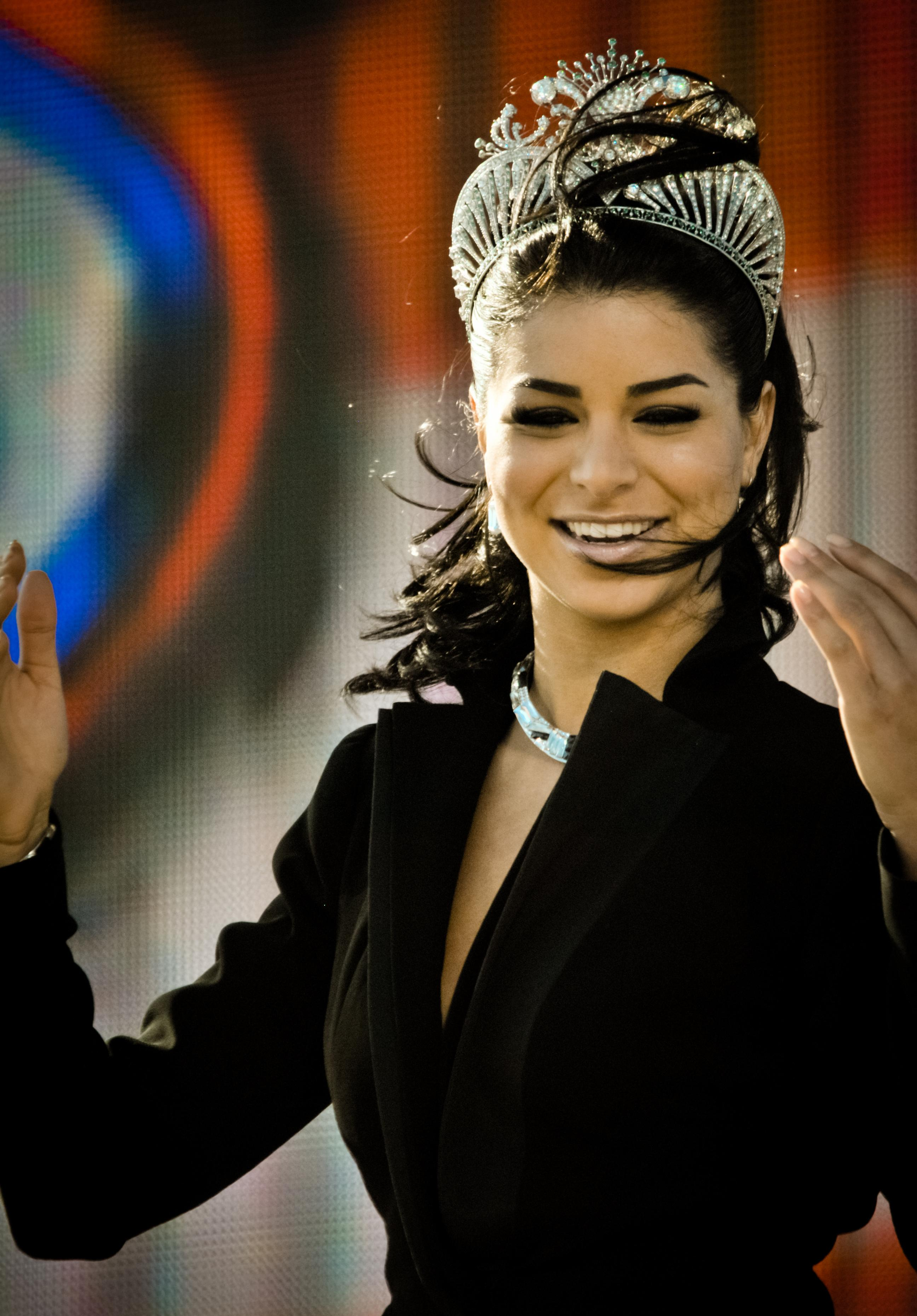
- Rima Fakih, Miss USA 2010
- Date: May 16, 2010
- Presenters: Natalie Morales; Curtis Stone; Joan Rivers; Melissa Rivers
- Entertainment: Boys Like Girls; Trace Adkins
- Venue: Planet Hollywood Theatre for the Performing Arts, Paradise, Nevada
- Broadcaster: NBC (KVBC-DT); Telemundo (KBLR)
- Entrants: 51
- Placements: 15
- Winner: Rima Fakih; Michigan

Miss USA 2010 was the 59th Miss USA pageant, held at the Planet Hollywood Theatre for the Performing Arts in Paradise, Nevada, on May 16, 2010, which was broadcast live on NBC. Kristen Dalton of North Carolina, crowned her successor, Rima Fakih of Michigan as Miss USA 2010 at the end of this event. This was Michigan's third Miss USA title and the first title in 17 years. Fakih became the first Arab American to win the Miss USA title. This was also the first pageant since 1986 taking place in the month of May.

Fakih represented the United States at the Miss Universe 2010 pageant in Las Vegas on August 23, 2010, where she did not advance to the semifinals; becoming the fifth Miss USA to do so in Miss Universe history (the last time was Shauntay Hinton in 2002).

Fakih's victory was made controversial with charges of bias facing the Miss USA pageant after Morgan Elizabeth Woolard, who was runner-up, defended Arizona's anti-illegal immigration bill.

The pageant was co-hosted by Australian celebrity chef Curtis Stone and Today show correspondent Natalie Morales. Color commentary was provided by Joan and Melissa Rivers. Pop rock band Boys Like Girls performed during the swimsuit competition and country music star Trace Adkins performed during the evening gown competition. Stone, Adkins, and both Rivers have all appeared on Donald Trump's television show Celebrity Apprentice.

== Background ==
=== Selection of contestants ===
One delegate from each state and the District of Columbia was chosen in state pageants held which began in July 2009 and ended in January 2010. The first state pageant was Florida, held on July 11, 2009. The final pageant was Arkansas, held on January 10, 2010.

Nine delegates are former Miss Teen USA state winners and two are former Miss America state winners. One delegate became a future Miss America state winner.

=== Preliminary round ===
Prior to the final telecast, the delegates competed in the preliminary competition, which involves private interviews with the judges and a presentation show where they compete in swimsuit and evening gown. The preliminary competition took place on May 12, 2010, at 10 pm (ET) hosted by Chet Buchanan and Kristen Dalton, and was broadcast online over Ustream. The 2010 pageant drew the notice of conservative commentators for releasing a set of "exotic and revealing" promotional photos.

=== Finals ===
During the final competition, the fifteen delegates with the highest average score from the preliminary competition were announced. The top fifteen competed in swimsuit, while the top ten competed evening gown, and the top five competed in the final question signed up by a panel of judges to determine the winner. The judges' composite score was shown after each round of competition for the second time since 2002.

== Results ==
=== Placements ===
Placement	Contestant
Miss USA 2010	Michigan – Rima Fakih
1st Runner-Up	Oklahoma – Morgan Woolard
2nd Runner-Up	Virginia – Samantha Casey
3rd Runner-Up	Colorado – Jessica Hartman
4th Runner-Up	Maine – Katie Whittier
Top 10	Tennessee – Tucker Perry; Alabama – Audrey Moore; Mississippi – Breanne Ponder; California – Nicole Johnson; Missouri – Ashley Strohmeier
Top 15	Wyoming – Claire Schreiner; Pennsylvania – Gina Cerilli; Kansas – Bethany Gerber; Nebraska – Belinda Wright; Arkansas – Adrielle Churchill

== Contestant notes ==
- Tracy Turnure, Miss Washington USA, was crowned by her twin sister Tara Turnure. This marks the first time that twins have won back-to-back at a Miss USA state pageant.
- Belinda Wright, Miss Nebraska USA, returned home on May 8 after her father was killed in a farming accident. She later returned to Las Vegas prior to the preliminary competition on May 11.
- Rima Fakih is the first Arab American to win the contest. When she won, she had to face many racist comments and allegations. The same thing happened when Nina Davuluri won rival pageant Miss America a few years later.
