= Rima Fakih =

American beauty pageant titleholder

- ريما فقيه
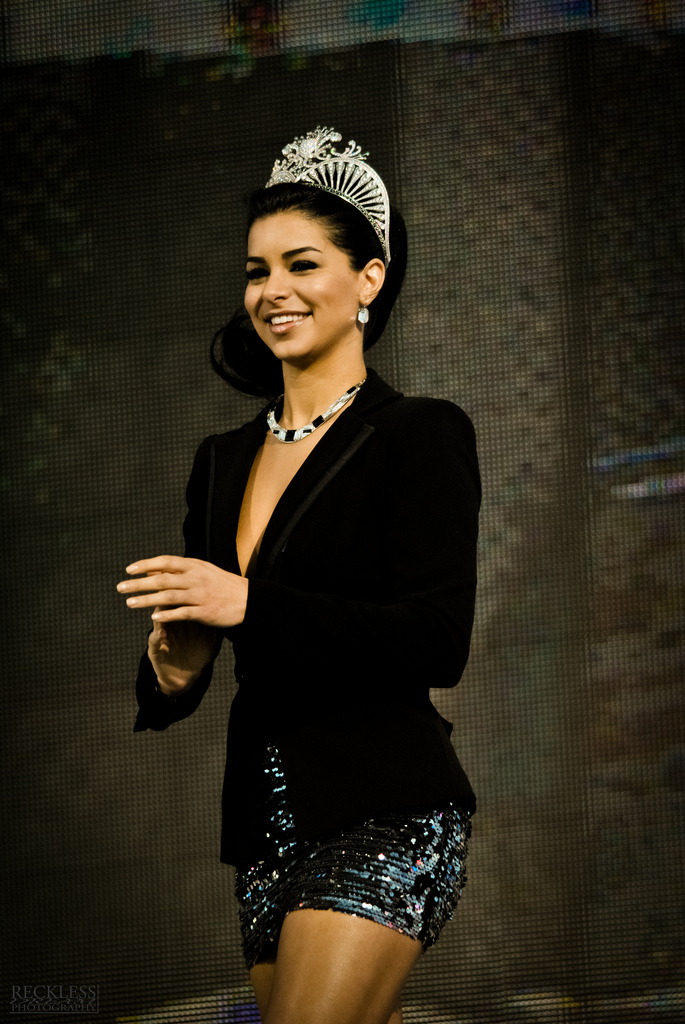
- Fakih in 2010
- Born: September 22, 1985 (age 41); Srifa, Lebanon
- Education: Henry Ford Community College (AA); University of Michigan–Dearborn (BBA)
- Occupations: Actress; professional wrestler
- Years active: 2004–present
- Title: Chairwoman of the World Food Program USA's Communications Committee
- Board member of: United Nations World Food Program USA; Best Buddies
- Spouse: Wassim Slaiby (m. 2016)
- Children: 4
- Beauty pageant titleholder
- Title: Miss Michigan USA 2010; Miss USA 2010
- Hair color: Black
- Eye color: Brown
- Major competitions: Miss Michigan USA 2010; (Winner); Miss USA 2010; (Winner); Miss Universe 2010; (Unplaced)
- Website: rimafakih.com

Rima Fakih Slaiby (Arabic: ريما فقيه صليبي; née Fakih; born September 22, 1985) is a Lebanese-born American former professional wrestler and beauty pageant titleholder who was crowned Miss USA 2010. Having previously been crowned Miss Michigan USA 2010, Fakih was the first Arab American woman and the third woman from Michigan to win the Miss USA title.

Fakih was a contestant in season five of WWE Tough Enough, where she trained to become a professional wrestler. In 2018, she became the national director of the Miss Universe Lebanon Organization. As a philanthropist and advocate, she has worked with numerous organizations in the United States and in Lebanon devoted to providing assistance for women and children.

== Early life and education ==
Rima Fakih was born on September 22, 1985, in Srifa, Lebanon, to parents Hussein and Nadia Fakih. She is the fourth of five children. Fakih was raised in a Shia Muslim family. She spent her early life in the village of Souk El Gharb, and attended a Catholic school near Beirut.

In 1993, Fakih and her family moved from Lebanon to New York City due to the effects of the Lebanese Civil War. After arriving in the United States, the family settled in Jackson Heights, Queens. Fakih attended St. John's Preparatory School in Astoria, while her father ran a restaurant in Manhattan. In New York, Fakih's family faced discrimination, and believed that this was due to events in the Middle East. Business at her father's restaurant began to rapidly decline following the September 11 attacks in 2001.

In 2003, Fakih moved with her family to Dearborn, Michigan, home to one of the largest Arab American populations in the country. After moving to Michigan, Fakih attended Henry Ford Community College and later received degrees in economics and business management from the University of Michigan–Dearborn. Initially, Fakih had planned to attend law school after completing her reign as Miss USA. Prior to becoming a pageant titleholder, Fakih worked at the Detroit Medical Center in development and recruiting the Arab American community.

== Pageantry ==
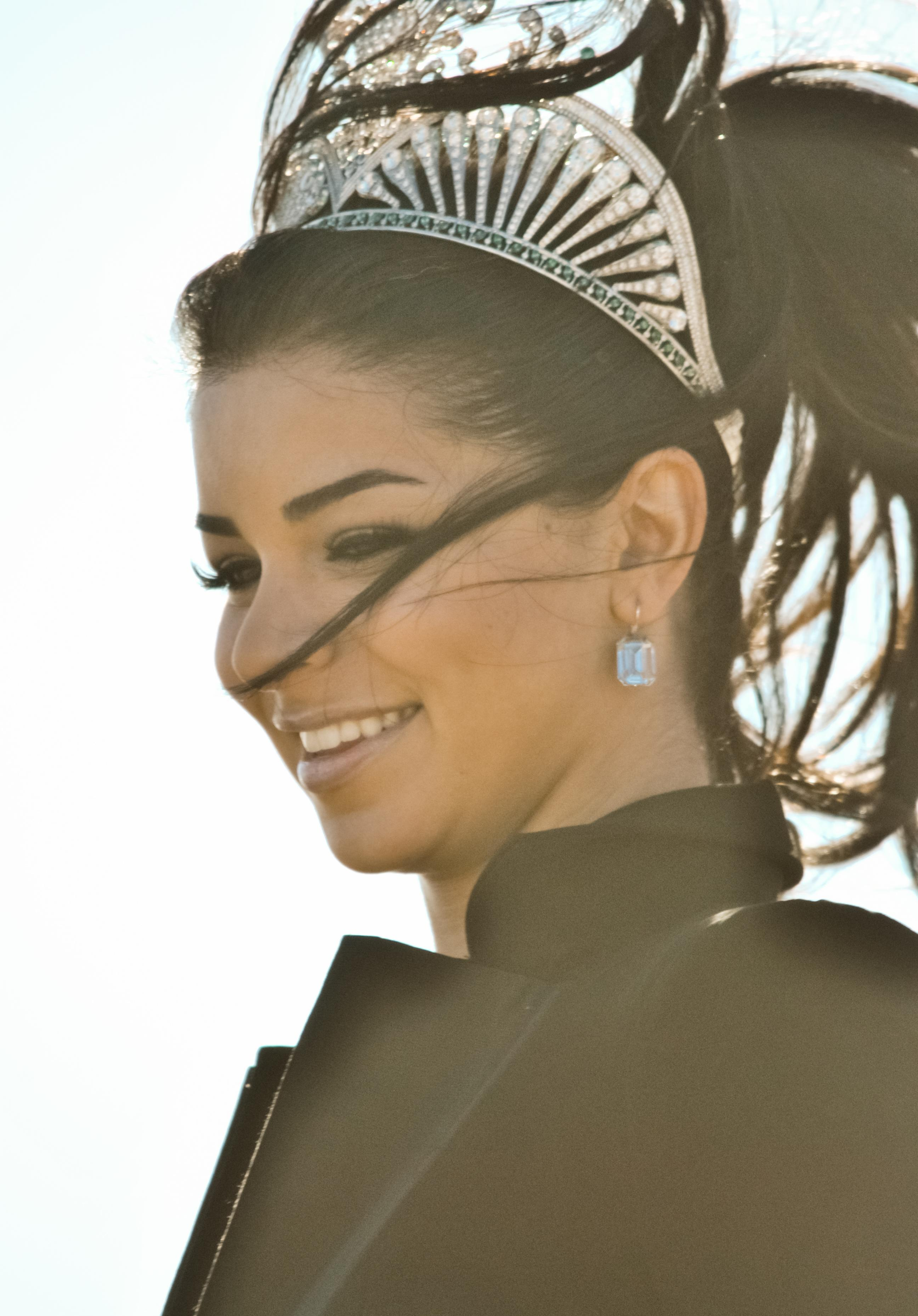
Fakih at the 2010 WWE Tribute To The Troops show in Fort Hood, Texas

VOA report about Fakih in 2010

=== Early pageantry ===
Fakih first began competing in pageantry at age 19, when she placed as the fourth runner-up at Miss Wayne County, a qualifying pageant for Miss Michigan within the Miss America system. She went on to compete in three minor international pageants.

In 2008, Fakih was selected to represent Michigan in the Miss Lebanon Emigrant pageant. The pageant was meant for women belonging to the international Lebanese diaspora, with the winner going on to compete in Miss Lebanon. Fakih placed as the second runner-up in the competition, behind winner Carina El Kaddissi of Brazil and first runner-up Jessica Kahawaty of Australia.

=== Miss USA 2010 ===
In 2009, Fakih won Miss Michigan USA 2010. As Miss Michigan USA, she received the right to represent Michigan at Miss USA 2010. Miss USA was held at the Zappos Theater within Planet Hollywood Las Vegas on May 16, 2010. After competing in the preliminary competition, Fakih was crowned the winner, her win ended a five-year streak of southern states winning the title. Following her win, Fakih became the third woman representing Michigan to win the Miss USA title following Carole Gist at Miss USA 1990 and Kenya Moore at Miss USA 1993, the first winner from the Midwest since Shandi Finnessey at Miss USA 2004 who won representing Missouri.

During and after the Miss USA competition, Fakih's background, religious beliefs, and Arab identity became the subject of media attention and discussion. Regarding her identity, Fakih stated "I'd like to say I'm American first, and I am an Arab-American, I am Lebanese-American, and I am Muslim-American." While her victory was celebrated by some in the Arab American community, she was also criticized by some amidst allegations that she did not properly represent Muslims. Iranian-Canadian Islamic scholar Ghazal Omid wrote "To say that she is a Muslim is inaccurate. No Muslim woman can call herself a Muslim and be on stage with her bikini." In response to criticism from some within the Muslim community, Fakih stated that while she and her family identify as Muslims and respect the religion, they are not as strict as others and do not define themselves by their religion, adding that they view themselves as more "spiritual" than "religious." Her religion and role in pageantry was further scrutinized after it emerged that Fakih had taken part in a "Stripper 101" competition hosted by Detroit morning show Mojo in the Morning, where she pole danced.

As Miss USA, Fakih received the right to represent the United States at Miss Universe 2010. The Miss Universe competition was later held on August 23, 2010, at the Mandalay Bay Events Center in Las Vegas. Her national costume was the Great Seal of the United States. Fakih was not selected as one of the fifteen semifinalists, becoming the first American entrant to fail to place in the competition since Shauntay Hinton at Miss Universe 2002, and only the fourth ever. Fakih later completed her reign as Miss USA on June 19, 2011, after crowning Alyssa Campanella of California as her successor at Miss USA 2011.

=== Miss Universe Lebanon ===
In 2018, Fakih received the license for the Miss Universe Lebanon competition, becoming the organization's national director. She organized the Miss Universe Lebanon 2018 competition, which crowned Maya Reaidy as its winner, who went on to represent Lebanon at Miss Universe 2018. The 2019 edition of the competition was later canceled due to the 2019–20 Lebanese protests, while the 2020 edition was never scheduled due to the COVID-19 pandemic in Lebanon.

== Philanthropy ==
As a part of Miss Universe, Fakih has worked with Best Buddies International to help create new opportunities for people with intellectual or developmental disabilities. She now serves as a board member for the organization. She was named as an ambassador for The Children's Cancer Center in Lebanon (CCCL) in February 2020. In March of the same year, she was appointed as an ambassador for School on Wheels, a non-profit organization dedicated to providing free tutoring and mentoring for children who are experiencing homelessness.

In response to the 2020 Beirut explosion, Fakih, alongside her husband Wassim Slaiby, created a campaign called #GlobalAidForLebanon, in collaboration with Global Citizen and the United Nations World Food Programme. The fundraiser has raised over 2 million dollars to provide assistance for those affected. On April 15, 2021, Fakih was appointed to the World Food Program USA's Board of Directors, where she serves as the chairwoman of their communications committee.

== Other ventures ==
=== Professional wrestling ===
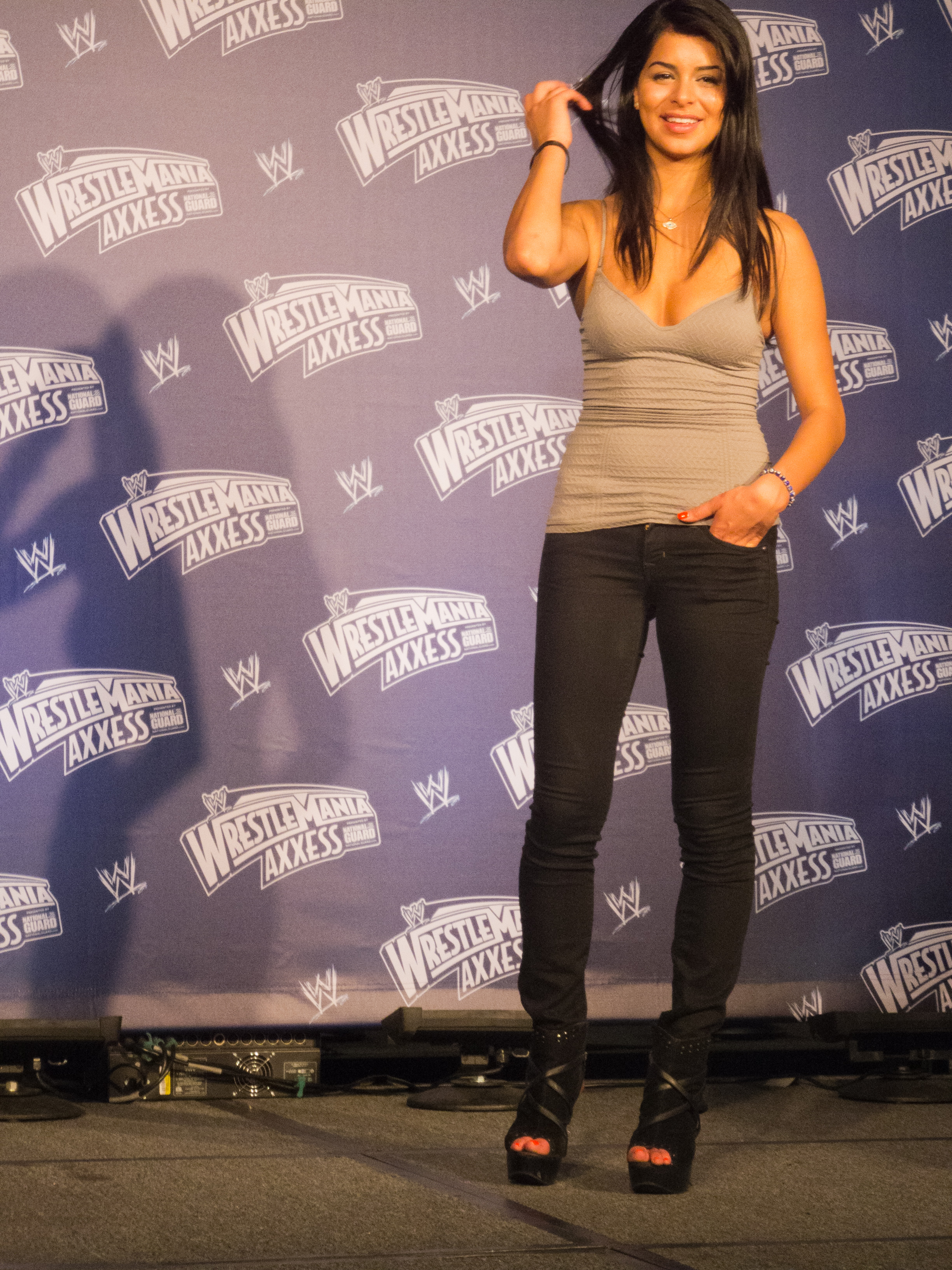
Fakih at WrestleMania Axxess in 2012

During her reign as Miss USA, Fakih was frequently involved in WWE events. She first appeared as a guest star on the November 29, 2010 episode of WWE Raw, where she crowned Sheamus as winner of the King of the Ring tournament. The following month, she appeared at the WWE Tribute to the Troops event in Fort Hood, Texas, where she served as the ring announcer. Fakih later appeared as a contestant on season five of WWE Tough Enough on the USA Network, competing for a contract with the WWE as a professional wrestler. She was eliminated from the competition in week four. Due to scheduling conflicts with Miss USA 2011, Fakih was the only contestant from the season not to appear in the live finale episode. Following her appearance in the series, Fakih revealed that she was receiving training to become a professional wrestler. In 2012, she made an appearance at WrestleMania Axxess.

=== Other media ===
Fakih was listed as number 86 on AskMen.com's top 99 women in 2011. Also in 2011, The Roots performed a freestyle about Fakih during her appearance on Late Night with Jimmy Fallon. Fakih also had a cameo in the film Real Steel (2011). In 2012, Fakih participated in the Fox dating game show The Choice as one of its four female celebrity bachelorettes in its June 28, 2012 episode. In 2015, Fakih competed in the Thai reality design competition series The Apartment - Celebrity Edition, where she placed as the runner-up behind Chinese actress Xiao Wang.

== Awards and recognition ==
After her coronation as Miss USA in 2010, Fakih was among the guests at the American Chamber of Commerce conference in Cairo alongside former US President Bill Clinton. In January 2010, Fakih received the key to Dearborn which was presented by Mayor John B. O'Reilly Jr.

- 86 in Top 99 Women, AskMen.com, 2011
- 410 in Power 500 2011, Arabian Business
- 100 in 100 Most Powerful Arab Women 2011, Arabian Business

== Personal life ==
In 2011, Fakih was arrested for driving under the influence of alcohol, resulting in an arrest for misdemeanor drunk driving.

On May 15, 2016, Fakih married music executive and talent manager Wassim Slaiby in a ceremony at The Patriarchal Edifice in Bkerké, Lebanon. Prior to their wedding, Fakih converted from Shia Islam to the Maronite Church. The wedding was presided over by Maronite Patriarch Bechara Boutros al-Rahi. The couple has four children.

== See also ==
- History of the Middle Eastern people in Metro Detroit

Awards and achievements
Preceded by Kristen Dalton North Carolina	Miss USA; 2010	Succeeded by Alyssa Campanella California
Preceded by Lindsey Tycholiz	Miss Michigan USA; 2010	Succeeded by Channing Pierce
