= Louise Roe =

English television presenter, journalist

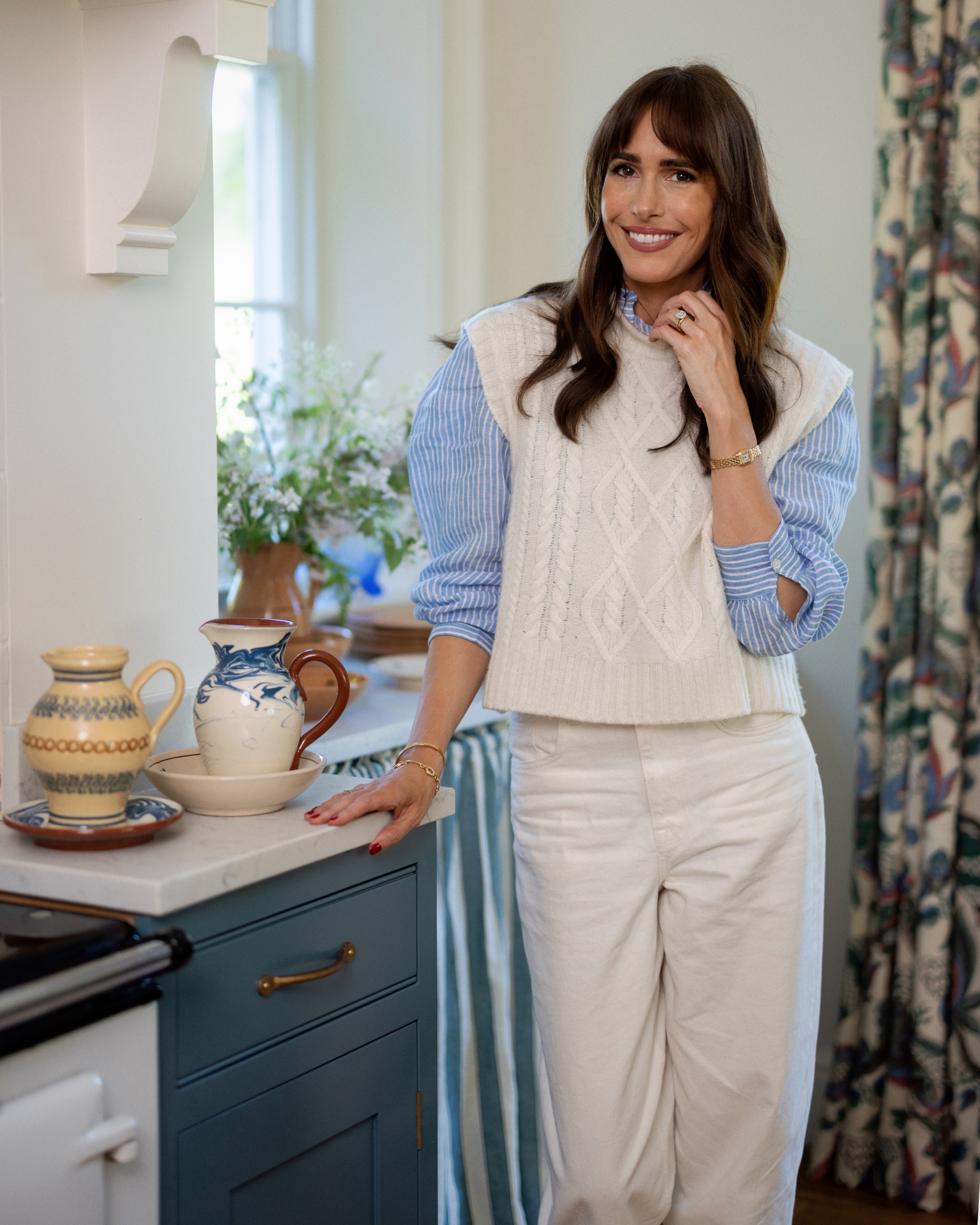
- Born: 3 December 1981 (age 44); Surrey, England, United Kingdom
- Occupations: Founder & fashion journalist
- Years active: 2007–present
- Website: louiseroe.com

Louise Roe (born 3 December 1981) is an English founder, fashion journalist and broadcaster. She is notable for hosting BBC's The Clothes Show, E!'s Fashion Police, E!'s Perfect Catch, the MTV Europe Music Awards' Red Carpet Show, and The CW's TV show Plain Jane. She hosted STAR World's reality TV show Fit for Fashion. In 2021 she founded homewares brand Sharland England

== Personal life ==
Louise Roe was born in Surrey, England on 3 December 1981.

After studying at Guildford High School, an independent girls' school in Surrey, she graduated from Durham University with a First Class Honors degree in English Literature.

Her first job was interning at Elle. In 2007, one of the editors asked her to be on BBC Breakfast. After the show, one of the producers asked her if she would like to be on another television show.

Roe married Mackenzie Hunkin in October 2016. The wedding was held at Eton College Chapel along with her family and friends.

Roe gave birth to her first daughter, Honor Florence Crosby Hunkin, 11 January 2018.

Roe gave birth to her second daughter, Inès Hunkin, 28 May 2021.

== Career ==
=== Journalism ===
She has written fashion articles for MSN, Vogue UK, Elle UK, and various magazines.

=== Television ===
Roe began her career as the news editor for Vogue.com, in London. She has since written for publications including Elle UK, In Style UK, People StyleWatch, CosmoGirl NL, Luxdeco Interiors magazine, and Martha Stewart Weddings.

She has hosted BBC's The Clothes Show, E!’s Fashion Police, and E!'s Perfect Catch.

She was a guest judge on Britain's Next Top Model and Project Catwalk.

In 2008, she presented the BBC show, Addicted to Boob Jobs. She has also hosted Style Network's How Do I Look, 10 Things I Hate About Me, and Make Me a Supermodel.

In 2009, she hosted E! Sexiest Catch. After hosting The Clothes Show and hosting web segments for Vogue.com, she moved to Los Angeles, California. She appeared in the second season of the MTV show The City. She also hosted The CW TV show Plain Jane.

In 2011, she was an on-air correspondent for E! during its royal wedding coverage on Friday 29 April.

On 6 November 2011, she hosted the MTV Europe Music Awards Red Carpet Show in 2011 and later again in 2012 and 2013.

In 2012, she was chosen to replace Elle Macpherson as host of the second season of NBC's reality competition program Fashion Star. The series premiered on 8 March 2013.

In 2015, Roe hosted Style by Jury for TLC as well as being the host of two seasons of Fit for Fashion, a reality TV show on for Fox Asia. Louise also released her first non-fiction book, Front Roe, in Spring 2015.

Roe still covers all red carpet coverage for NBC's Access Hollywood.

Roe also runs her Front Roe blog, a celebration of her favourite fashion, beauty and lifestyle moments.
