= Todd Anthony Tyler =

Canadian reality television judge, fashion photographer and model

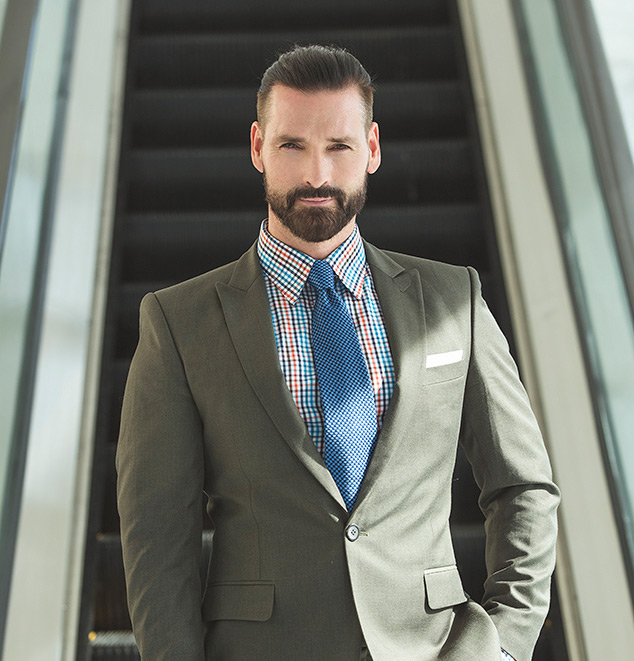
- Born: Sudbury, Ontario
- Education: Trent University
- Known for: Photographer, TV Host.
- Spouse: Karina Smith
- Website: http://toddanthonytyler.com/

Todd Anthony Tyler is a Canadian reality television judge, fashion photographer and former model. He was the resident photographer and judge for the first season of Asia's Next Top Model. He is also the resident photographer and judge of TV show Fit for Fashion.

== Early life ==
Born in Sudbury, Ontario, Tyler is the son of Judy Smith. He has one sister and graduated from Trent University with a BSc in Biology and related studies in art history, having also done one semester at Simon Fraser University.

Tyler lived on a farm until he was 16. His parents divorced, and his step father owned a gym, where Tyler began weight training. When Tyler was young, his mother gave him a 110 film cartridge camera, which he used to shoot nature and landscape images.

== Career ==
=== Model, photographer, TV personality ===
Tyler started his professional modelling career modelling in Milan, Italy with model agency Model Plan in 1994. He carried on modelling internationally until 2003 when he switched to the other side of the camera and took up professional fashion photography.

He is self-taught. His first professional position was as a shoot photographer for a Singapore-based catalog magazine. His client roster includes Vogue China, Elle Singapore, Harper's Bazaar China, L'Officiel, GQ China, Indochino, Ports 1961, Nike Numero, Stella McCartney and others. His studio Todd Anthony Tyler Photography opened in Shanghai, China in 2003.

In December 2013, Tyler photographed HRH Princess Sirivannavari Nariratana of Thailand for Numéro magazine.

He has provided art direction and photography in the form of advertising campaigns for Ritz-Carlton Hotels, L'Oreal Paris, and Adidas.

Some of his influences are Steven Meisel, Terry Richardson, David LaChapelle and Helmut Newton. He has compared his own work to "National Geographic style images"in that they are drawing influence from various cultures.

In 2012, he was the resident photographer and judge on season 1 of Asia's Next Top Model. Since 2014 Tyler has been the resident photographer and judge on reality television show Fit for Fashion. He appeared in episode 7 of China's Next Top Model season 5. In 2013, Tyler appeared as guest judge on MEGA Fashion Crew's season 3.

In 2014, he was the chief photographer for the stills team of The Apartment - Celebrity Edition. He also provided creative direction, production and photography for the advertising media campaign for Lady and The Tiger theater production in April 2014, Shanghai.

Tyler has also written columns on the profession. He contributed a monthly column to Asian Photography magazine from 2010–2014 and is sometimes guest technical columnist for Mega Man magazine in the Philippines.

=== Filmography ===
Television
Year	Title	Role	Notes
2012–13	Asia's Next Top Model	Himself	Season 1 judge
2013	MEGA Fashion Crew	Himself	Guest judge in season 3
2014	The Apartment - Celebrity Edition	Himself	Chief photographer stills team
2014–present	Fit for Fashion	Himself	Judge and resident photographer

== Personal life ==
Tyler is now one of the co-founders of Gummy Gainz and owner of Black Biscuit Canada. Tyler is co-owner of a yoga clothing company called Aumnie. He has two children and is married to ex model Karina Smith, who now works with Tyler.

Tyler carries out philanthropic work for Happy Hearts Fund Indonesia and Foundation for Mother and Child Health.
