= Kahi Lee =

American interior designer and television host (born 1979)

Kahi Lee (born 30 December 1979) is an American interior designer and television host. She was born in Washington, D.C. to Korean parents and raised in Palos Verdes Estates, California.

Kahi has appeared as an interior design expert and television host on Design on a Dime on HGTV, Merge on Lifetime Network, Renovate My Family on Fox, The Ultimate Gamer on Spike TV, FreeStyle on HGTV, My Celebrity Home and What I Hate About Me on Style Network.

Kahi is also a contributing design expert and "buddy" on the Daytime Emmy Award winning Rachael Ray (TV series). Kahi has also made guest appearances on The Early Show on CBS, The Tyra Banks Show and G4's Attack of the Show among others. In 2011, she host the reality competition show "The Apartment".

Kahi Lee married Jeff T. Thomas in 2010. The couple has a daughter (March 2013) and son (2017).

== Works ==
- 2011: "Rough Luxe Design"
