= Laurence Llewelyn-Bowen =

English interior designer and television personality

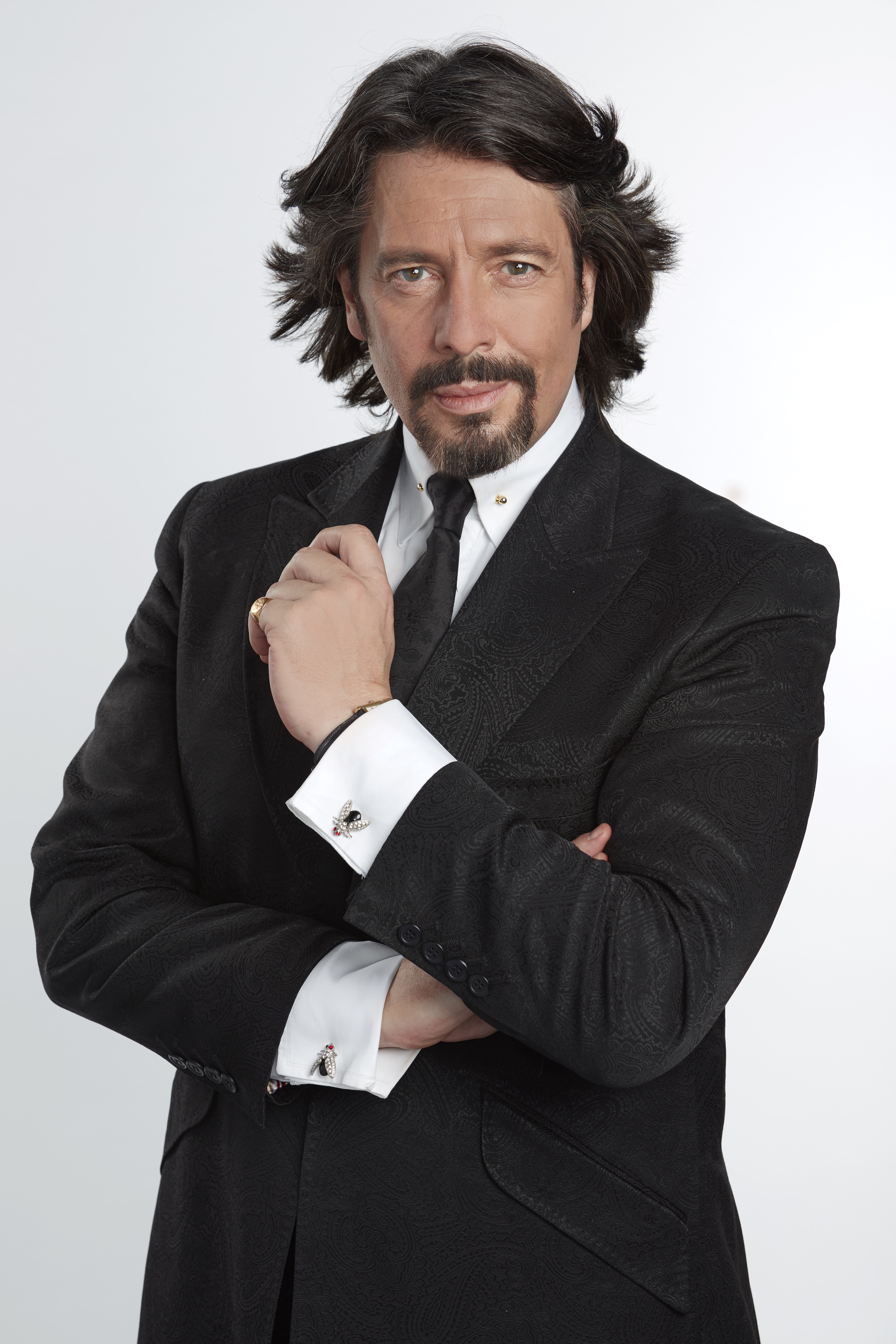
- Llewelyn-Bowen in 2016
- Born: Laurence Roderick Bowen; 11 March 1965 (age 61); Kensington, London, England
- Education: Camberwell School of Arts and Crafts
- Occupations: Interior designer, television personality
- Years active: 1996–present
- Known for: Changing Rooms; Popstar to Operastar; Auction Party
- Spouse: Jackie Llewelyn-Bowen (m. 1989)
- Children: 2
- Parent(s): Trefor Llewelyn Bowen; Patricia Wilks
- Website: llewelyn-bowen.co.uk

Laurence Roderick Llewelyn-Bowen (born 11 March 1965) is an English interior designer and television personality best known for appearing on the BBC programme Changing Rooms.

== Name ==
He is sometimes credited as "Laurence Llewellyn", and the components of his name are sometimes misspelled as "Lawrence". On Changing Rooms, he is occasionally jocularly styled "Lord Laurence", a play on Laurence Olivier and Llewellyn-Bowen's flamboyance.

== Early life and education ==
Laurence Roderick Bowen was born in 1965 in Kensington, London, to parents Trefor Llewellyn Bowen and Patricia (née Wilks). His father, an orthopaedic surgeon at Harley Street and, under the NHS, at St James' Hospital, Balham, South London, died of leukaemia in 1974, aged 42, when Laurence was nine. He went to primary school at Julians, in Leigham Court Road, Streatham, where his favourite subject was art, especially needlework. His mother, a teacher, died in 2002. He is of Welsh descent.

According to his website, Llewelyn-Bowen was educated at Alleyn's School in Dulwich and later graduated from the Camberwell School of Arts and Crafts (which became a constituent college of the University of the Arts London) in 1986 with an unspecified Fine Art degree.

== Early career ==
After graduating, Llewelyn-Bowen worked for the Harefield Group of Companies and the interior design firm Peter Leonard Associates. In 1989 he started his own design consultancy.

== Television ==
Llewelyn-Bowen presented the BBC and Channel 4 television series Changing Rooms.

On 14 April 2009 he presented a documentary on BBC One in the West region in which he went In Search of England's Green & Pleasant Land. The programme explored the threats to the rural way of life from urban creep and the loss of local services.

A study of Llewelyn-Bowen's family tree featured in the BBC One show Who Do You Think You Are?, which was first aired on 29 September 2008. It showed that Llewelyn-Bowen's mother's family had a seafaring history.

Between 2009 and 2011 Llewelyn-Bowen appeared on every episode of the ITV show House Gift.

Llewelyn-Bowen appeared as a judge on the 2010 series of the ITV reality talent show Popstar to Operastar as a critic alongside Meat Loaf, and classically trained mentors Katherine Jenkins and Rolando Villazón. The series was hosted by Myleene Klass and Alan Titchmarsh.

Between 2010 and 2011, Llewelyn-Bowen presented the daytime ITV show Auction Party.

Llewelyn-Bowen appeared as a judge on the series of the reality show The Apartment from 2012 to 2019.

The BBC One series, Hidden Houses of Wales, featured Llewelyn-Bowen as tour guide of historical houses throughout Wales. The programme premiered on 4 January 2010 and ran for two series. The series was licensed to streaming service, Netflix, in the U.S. and rebranded as Hidden Houses, premiering on the service on 31 December 2016.

He features frequently in the BBC programme, DIY SOS: The Big Build as a designer.

In 2017, he joined Australia's Seven Network reality renovation series House Rules as a new judge.

In 2024, Llewelyn-Bowen presented the four-part series titled Outrageous Homes with Laurence Llewelyn-Bowen.

In 2025, Llewelyn-Bowen was a contestant on Netflix's reality competition television series, Celebrity Bear Hunt.

=== Stepping Out ===
Llewelyn-Bowen participated in the first series of the ITV entertainment series Stepping Out with his wife, Jackie. They were eliminated on 21 September 2013, claiming third place.

Note: In Week 4, The week's challenge was for each celebrity to dance with someone else's partner in the "Wife Swap" challenge. Llewelyn-Bowen danced once with Jackie and the second time with Oritsé Williams' partner AJ Azari.

Week	Dance	Judges' scores				Result
Week	Dance	Wayne Sleep	Melanie Brown	Jason Gardiner	Total	Result
1	Street Dance	4; 5	3; 7	4; 3	26	Safe
2	American Smooth	6; 7	5; 7	5; 6	36	Safe
3	Rock & Roll	8; 7	7; 5	7; 5	39	Safe
4	Paso Doble	5; 7	3; 3	3; 3	24	Eliminated
4	Jazz	8	10	7	25	Eliminated

=== Guest appearances ===
- The League of Gentlemen (10 October 2002) – Series 3, Episode 4 – The Medusa Touch – self
- Dick & Dom in da Bungalow (7 January 2006) – Series 5, Episode 31 – Celebrity guest
- The Weakest Link (20 August 2005) – Celebrity contestant, voted off seventh
- Who Wants to Be a Millionaire? (11 February 2006) – Celebrity contestants, won £500,000 for Shooting Star Chase Children's Hospice; originally answered a flawed £1 million question incorrectly and lost £468,000, but were invited back to play a new £1 million question, and walked away with £500,000 (see controversy section below)
- All Star Family Fortunes (5 January 2008) – Celebrity contestant
- As Seen on TV (17 July 2009) – Guest
- Odd One In (17 July 2010) – Panellist
- The Alan Titchmarsh Show (15 November 2010, 9 November 2011, 13 September 2013)
- Lorraine (25 July 2011, 29 April 6 September 2013) – Guest
- Loose Women (3 August 2011) – Guest
- The Chase: Celebrity Special (26 November 2011) – Celebrity contestant, won £20,000 for Shooting Star Chase Children's Hospice
- Great Lives – Guest, his choice was Aubrey Beardsley (15 January 2013)
- I Love My Country (14 September 2013) – Panellist
- Celebrity Antiques Road Trip (2 December 2013) – Contestant
- Room 101 (7 March 2014) – Guest
- Joe Lycett's Got Your Back (24 April 2020) – Guest
- Interior Design Masters (25 September 2019, 2 February 2021) – Guest
- Would I Lie to You (27 January 2023)

== Radio ==
In 2008 he began hosting a Sunday morning radio show The Sunday Spa on Classic FM.

== Early 2000s ==
In 2002 Llewelyn-Bowen made a cameo appearance in the comedy series The League of Gentlemen, in which he comes to decorate the garden of one of the characters. He acts as a depressed, smoking, and comically bald version of himself, and is killed by a collapsing wall.

In 2004 Llewelyn-Bowen designed the interior of the Inc Bar in Greenwich, England in a former 1830s music hall. The design features Larry's Bar, named after Llewelyn-Bowen and "the Divan", a dimly lit nook, a sort of make-out room.

He has also presented a three-part BBC special Taste (2002), about the history of interior design, and in autumn 2005 he began presenting the weekly BBC1 travel show Holiday 2006. His books include Fantasy Rooms: Inspirational Designs from the BBC Series (1999), Display (2001), "Home Front": Inside Out (2002), Design Rules (2003) and A Pinch of Posh (2006) co-written with his wife, Jackie. He has also made a guest appearance on Changing Rooms' American counterpart, Trading Spaces.

In March 2005 he starred in a one-off mockumentary as a prospective candidate for Parliament. His party, the Purple Party, "lobbied" for a restoration of Britain's heritage, and several extreme architectural measures such as tearing down all buildings that did not conform to their surroundings.

== Who Wants to Be a Millionaire? controversy ==
£1 million (15 out of 15) – No time limit

Translated from the Latin, what is the motto of the United States?

1. In God we trust(chosen; incorrect answer)
2. One out of many(correct answer)
3. All as one
4. Striving together
The Bowens' original million pound question

In January 2006, Llewelyn-Bowen and his wife Jackie were offered a place on the Valentine's Day celebrity couples edition of Who Wants to Be a Millionaire? They appeared on the show managing to reach the £1 million question, before answering it incorrectly and dropping from £500,000 down to £32,000 (a loss of £468,000). For the first time ever, Celador allowed Llewelyn-Bowen and his wife to retry the show after the company claimed that the last question "didn't meet their standards".

The original, allegedly misleading question was "Translated from the Latin, what is the motto of the United States?" The answer given was "In God we trust" which is originally English and has in fact been the motto of the United States since 1956. The intended answer had been "One out of many" which is a translation of the Latin phrase E pluribus unum, which is found on the Great Seal, however it is not actually the current United States motto. E pluribus unum had been the de facto motto but was never legally declared as such.

After returning and being shown a different £1 million question, the couple decided not to risk losing £468,000 for the second time and won £500,000 for their chosen charity, The Shooting Star Children's Hospice, of which Llewelyn-Bowen and his wife are both patrons. This amount is the highest amount that any celebrity couple has won on any British edition of Who Wants To Be a Millionaire? Their new question was about the first man to travel to space twice, and the correct answer to the question was Gus Grissom.

== Work since 2007 ==
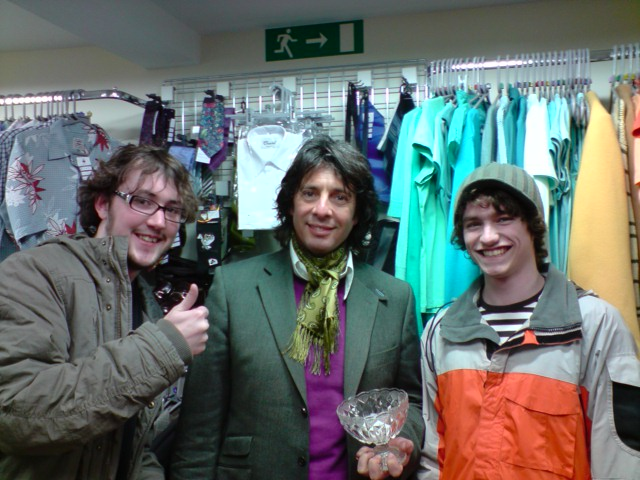
Laurence Llewelyn-Bowen opening a charity shop in Stow-on-the-Wold in 2009

In 2007 he designed Decodance for Blackpool Illuminations, featuring six illuminated burlesque beauties.

In November 2007 he and his family were depicted in the Living TV series To the Manor Bowen. Llewelyn-Bowen designed a line of wallpaper in collaboration with the British Home Decor Company Graham & Brown.

In 2008 he returned to Blackpool Illuminations to design Venus Reborn, a theatric tableau with a 15-minute show of sound, light and water effects.

In 2009 Llewelyn-Bowen released two ranges of papercrafting products in conjunction with Trimcraft, called Retro Rose and Venaissence.

Llewelyn-Bowen was the Creative Director For the 2010 Blackpool Illuminations, designing new illuminations including dinosaurs, vampires and ghouls.

Llewelyn-Bowen has been head judge on reality TV show The Apartment since 2012.

In November 2014 he designed a Christmas attraction, Magical Journey, at the Belfry Golf Club near Sutton Coldfield, which was heavily criticised, receiving hundreds of complaints and the epithet "Tragic Journey" on its opening day; the event closed down in mid-December, and apologies were sent to ticket holders who were advised to contact their banks for refunds.

Since 2017 he has appeared on the Australian TV series House Rules in seasons 5–8 as one of three judges, co-starring with Home Beautiful editor in chief Wendy Moore, and award-winning Australian architect Drew Heath. In 2020, Moore and Heath were replaced by interior designer Kyly Clarke and builder Saul Myers.

In 2017, he was co-presenter alongside Neville Knott on the Irish TV3 lifestyle program Showhouse Showdown (Vision Independent Productions).

In 2019, he took part in the BBC series Celebrity Painting Challenge and he became a judge alongside Juliet Ashworth in the Australian programme Instant Hotel.

From 2019 to 2024, he appeared in a comedic advertising campaign for online bathroom retailer Victorian Plumbing in the UK.

In 2020, renowned designer has teamed up with handcrafted furniture brand Aspire to launch the new upholstered bed design.

Since 17 August 2021 he has re-appeared as resident designer on the reboot of the popular 90s makeover show Changing Rooms on Channel 4 with new host Anna Richardson. In 2022 he appeared in Pilgrimage as part of a group of celebrities with different religious affiliations who travelled in the footsteps of Saint Columba. Llewelyn-Bowen participated as a "non-conforming pagan".

He switched on the Blackpool Illuminations on 2 September 2022 replacing Johnny Vegas who had to pull out at short notice.

== Personal life ==
Until 2004 Llewelyn-Bowen lived in Kidbrooke, South East London. He, his wife Jackie and their two daughters, born 1995 and 1998, moved to a 17th-century, grade-II listed manor house in Siddington, a small village near Cirencester, Gloucestershire in April 2007.

He is related to Emanuel Bowen, map maker to King George II.
