= Jamie Durie =

Australian television presenter (born 1970)

Jamie Durie OAM
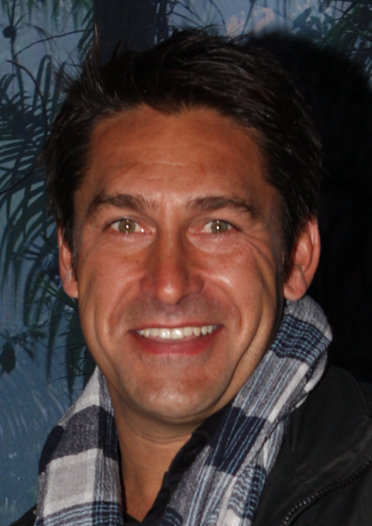
- Jamie Durie in 2012
- Born: Jamie Paul Durie; 3 June 1970 (age 56); Sydney, New South Wales, Australia
- Occupations: Landscaper; horticulturalist; furniture designer; television presenter; television producer; author
- Years active: 1986−present
- Known for: The Outdoor Room with Jamie Durie – HGTV (2010–present); House Rules – Seven Network (2019–2020); The Living Room – Network Ten (2015–2018)
- Children: 3
- Website: jamiedurie.com

Jamie Paul Durie (born 3 June 1970) is an Australian horticulturalist and landscape designer, furniture designer, television host, television producer, and author of eleven books on landscape architecture, garden design and lifestyle.

Durie was the television host of the 2008 Australian lifestyle program The Outdoor Room, broadcast on the Seven Network. He hosted the design makeover show HGTV Showdown in 2009. Durie hosted the US PBS series The Victory Garden from 2007 to 2010. The show is PBS network's longest-running gardening TV series.

Following the end of The Outdoor Room on the Seven Network in 2010, Durie adapted the series for the American HGTV network with a new team of designers, horticulturists and contractors.

In November 2024, Growing Home with Jamie Durie aired on Channel 7, a series in which Durie documented making his family home sustainable and off-grid.

== Early life ==
Durie was born in Manly, New South Wales, and spent his formative years living in Tom Price, Western Australia. His maternal grandmother, Daphne de Zylva, was born in Sri Lanka and met his English grandfather in the air force during World War II. They moved to Australia in the 1950s. His parents separated when Durie was age 10, and he relocated with his mother and brother, Clyde Hep, to the Gold Coast. His paternal grandmother was a volunteer surf-lifesaver on the NSW Central Coast.

Having left high-school in Brisbane at age 15, he tried his hand at cabinetmaking and modeled beachwear part-time. Durie entered the entertainment industry in his teens as an exotic dancer in the all-male revue troupe, Manpower Australia, with whom he toured for seven years. At age 26, he completed a four-year horticultural and landscape design course.

== Landscape design and television hosting ==
Durie founded the landscape design company, Patio Landscape Architecture and Design, in 1998. In 2002, Durie registered the Australian business company, JPD Media & Design. He then hosted the TV series Backyard Blitz and The Block.

In 2007, Durie participated in the 6th Australian series of Dancing with the Stars, in which he was eliminated in 7th place, on 17 April 2007.

The same year, Durie hosted Australia's Best Backyards on the Seven Network. The show was a lifestyle garden program, similar to Backyard Blitz on the Nine Network. Also in 2007, Durie appeared lifestyle segments with Winfrey, on the Oprah Winfrey Network (U.S. TV channel), whom he credits as giving him his US TV breakthrough. Following these appearances, Durie relocated to the US.

Durie hosted the US PBS series The Victory Garden from 2007 to 2010. Durie hosted the dynamic design makeover show HGTV Showdown on the HGTV network in 2009.

In 2008, Durie was the television host of the Australian lifestyle program The Outdoor Room, broadcast on Seven Network, with repeats broadcast on 7Two.

Following the end of The Outdoor Room show on the Seven Network, in 2010, Durie relocated the concept of the series to broadcast on the HGTV network as The Outdoor Room with Jamie Durie. Unable to bring his own Australian design team along, Durie put together a new team of designers, horticulturists and contractors. In his HGTV series, Durie grooms neglected yards in Southern California with design schemes inspired by gardens and landscapes from around the world. The Outdoor Room with Jamie Durie uses sustainable ideas, such as low-water plantings and reclaimed hardscape in garden designs.

Since 2015, Durie has co-presented as a visiting expert in gardening & landscaping, on the Australian lifestyle program, The Living Room, a quadruple award-winner of the Logie Award for Most Popular Lifestyle Program, that airs on Network Ten.

In 2019, Durie joined Australia's Seven Network reality renovation series House Rules as a new judge.

In August 2022, Durie was revealed to be the Tiger on the fourth season of Network 10's The Masked Singer Australia.

In November 2024 Growing Home with Jamie Durie is Jamie Durie's latest television program, aired on Channel 7 and 7plus. This four-part series chronicles the three-year process of designing and building a "sustainable, off-grid" family home.

== Furniture design and merchandise lines ==
In 2010, Durie's company Patio Landscape Architecture and Design was renamed Durie Design, committed to not just rejuvenating the existing gardens, but offering new outdoor destinations for the clients, and with an emphasis on furniture design.

With his furniture design success, Durie has worked for Hollywood celebrity clients, such as designing 100 pieces of furniture for American talk show host and comedian Chelsea Handler and he designed garden landscapes for actress Charlize Theron for two years.

In November 2024, Jamie Durie relaunched Patio by Jamie Durie, his signature outdoor living and lifestyle brand.

== Awards and accolades ==
The Australian reality television garden makeover program Backyard Blitz, on the Nine Network, was the winner of six Logie Awards of Most Popular Lifestyle Program (from 2001 until 2006). Durie won the Logie Award for the Most Popular New Talent award in 2001, and was nominated for the Most Popular Presenter award for his role in Backyard Blitz from 2003 to 2005.

Durie's 2003 landscape design book, Patio - Garden Design and Inspiration, (Allen & Unwin - ISBN 9781741146547) was short-listed APA Book Design Awards, for Best Designed Illustrated Book 2003 Australia.

In 2008, Durie won a gold medal at Britain's prestigious Royal Horticultural Society (RHS) Chelsea Flower Show in Chelsea, London. A team of 22 workers built the AU$800,000, 200sqm celebration of the Kimberley landscape, called Australian Garden and designed by Durie, in 16 days. Australian Garden won one of the eight Gold Medals given in the Show Garden category. All the materials were shipped from Australia.

In 2012, Durie was awarded the Medal of the Order of Australia (OAM) for services to the environment, and charity work.

The next year, Durie began collaborating with the Italian luxury furniture brand Natuzzi Group Riva 1920. Durie and Riva 1920 launched a bespoke collection of five furniture pieces, including the Tubular dining table, to widespread acclaim at Milan Furniture Fair 2013. The Tubular table and chair (the range also includes bookshelves) and Durie's Bungalow range were both finalists in the New York Design Awards, announced in Manhattan on 20 May 2014, for Product Design Category, Furniture Indoor & Outdoor.

== Philanthropic efforts ==
Each year, Durie donates his time and resources to many charities, including FSHD Global Research Foundation facioscapulohumeral muscular dystrophy (FSHD), the Children's Cancer Institute and The Children's Hospital at Westmead (also called the Royal Alexandra Hospital for Children or Sydney Children's Hospital Network, Westmead), Sydney, New South Wales, Australia. Durie has been a dedicated supporter of Tour de Cure, frequently serving as an MC at their gala events in recent years. In March 2024, Durie took on a huge personal challenge, cycling over 1,200 km in just one week as part of the Tour de Cure Signature Tour to raise vital funds for cancer research, prevention, and support initiatives across Australia.

== Personal life ==
Durie owns properties on the Northern Beaches of Sydney, Australia, and in Los Angeles. He is unmarried, but has been engaged three times. He has stated, "I've always been career-focused and my relationships have suffered because of that". Durie is currently engaged to Ameka Jane. They have two children together.

Additionally, Durie has an adult daughter who lives in Los Angeles named Taylor, from his previous relationship with Michelle Glennock. Durie says, "We go camping together, surfing and bike riding". Durie describes his life as "I want simply to find more balance and walk down the little path of self discovery...".

== Filmography ==
Television

Year	Title	Role	Notes
2000	Who Wants to Be a Millionaire?	Contestant	Celebrity contestant; won $1,000.
2000–2005	Backyard Blitz	Main host and the lead landscaper	Reality TV garden makeover program on Nine Network
2003–2006	The Block	Host / presenter	Reality TV renovation program on Nine Network
2006	Torvill and Dean's Dancing on Ice	Presenter	One series on the Nine Network.
2007	Dancing with the Stars	Competitor	6th Australian series of DWTS on Seven Network
2007	Australia's Best Backyards	Host / presenter	Garden makeover program on Seven Network
2007–2010	The Victory Garden	Host / presenter	Lifestyle TV renovation program on US PBS Network
2008	The Outdoor Room	Host / presenter	Garden renovation / lifestyle TV program on Seven Network
2007–2008	Oprah Winfrey Network (U.S. TV channel)	Visiting expert landscaper presenter	To make her neighbours' balconies into miniature Edens, Oprah sends a call Down Under to get help from Jamie Durie – one of Australia's biggest TV stars and one of the world's most famous gardeners.
2009	HGTV Showdown	Host / presenter	Garden makeover TV program on US HGTV Network
2010–present	The Outdoor Room with Jamie Durie	Host / presenter	Garden renovation / lifestyle TV program on US HGTV Network
2015–2018	The Living Room	Visiting expert landscaper presenter	Lifestyle TV program on Network 10
2019—present	Australia By Design	Host	Host of Australian design program on Network Ten
2019—2020	House Rules	Judge/co-host	Series 7 (as a judge) / Series 8 (as a co-host)
2022	The Masked Singer Australia	Contestant (Tiger)	Eliminated in episode 4
2024	Growing Home with Jamie Durie	Host	Home Renovation/Lifestyle TV program
2025	Claire Hooper's House of Games	Self	5 episodes

== Bibliography ==
- Patio : Garden Design and Inspiration - Author: Jamie Durie (2003), Allen & Unwin Publishers (Reprint: 2016).
- Outdoor Kids: A Practical Guide for Kids in the Garden - Author: Jamie Durie (2005), Jamie Durie Publisher.
- Inspired : The Ideas That Shape and Create My Design - Author: Jamie Durie (2006), HarperCollins Publishers.
- 100 Gardens - Author: Jamie Durie (2011), Allen & Unwin Publishers.
- The Outdoor Room - Author: Jamie Durie (2011), HarperCollins Publishers.
- Edible Garden Design: Delicious Designs from the Ground Up - Author: Jamie Durie (2014), Lantern Australia Publishers.
- The Source Book: Plants, Materials, Products and Ideas for Contemporary Outdoor Spaces & Where to Get Them - Author: Jamie Durie (2011), HarperCollins Publishers.
- Living Design - Authors: Jamie Durie and Nadine Bush (2016), Lantern Australia Publishers.
