= Sea Toll Program =

Indonesian government program

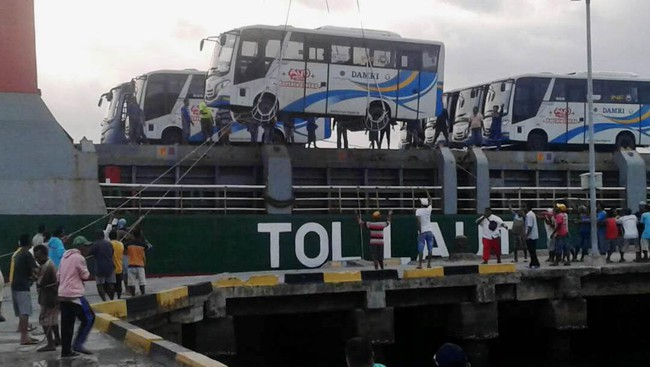
An activity involving a ship under Sea Toll Program. All ships under the program have "Tol Laut" (meaning Sea Toll) written on their hull.

The Sea Toll Program (Indonesian: Tol Laut), sometimes called the Sea Highway Program, is a program initiated by former Indonesian president Joko Widodo. Its aim is to reduce price disparity between the main islands of Indonesia and smaller isolated islands, especially those in East Indonesia. It was launched in 2015, and has legal basis under Presidential Decree Number 106 of 2015 & Decree from Ministry of Transportation Number 4 of 2016. The program consists of the construction of new container ports in smaller regions and regularly scheduled highly subsidized ship routes from main ports of Indonesia to smaller and more isolated ports.

== Background ==
Due to Indonesia's geography, smaller isolated islands have long lacked the infrastructure necessary for the distribution of resources. As a result, these islands lack availability of basic goods, with prices correspondingly higher than on the main islands of Java, Sumatra and Borneo.

A specialized logistical system for Indonesia was first proposed during the Yudhoyono presidency, but was never fully carried out. Joko Widodo proposed his vision of developing Indonesia from the "periphery", emphasizing that the country should pay more attention to developing and isolated regions that are often neglected. During the 2014 presidential debate, he proposed his vision called "Nawacita", a 9-point strategy which included a plan to even out development between periphery, border, and isolated areas, and the big cities of Indonesia. This included reduction of price disparities, inclusive economic development, and greater availability of goods and transportation for those that live in Indonesia's periphery regions. Additionally, he wanted to strengthen Indonesia's identity as a maritime nation.

In 2015, Widodo made a speech proposing the Sea Toll Program to reduce the price disparity of goods, especially within small islands and border regions. The program was subsequently established in the same year with three initial shipping routes.

== Ship classes ==
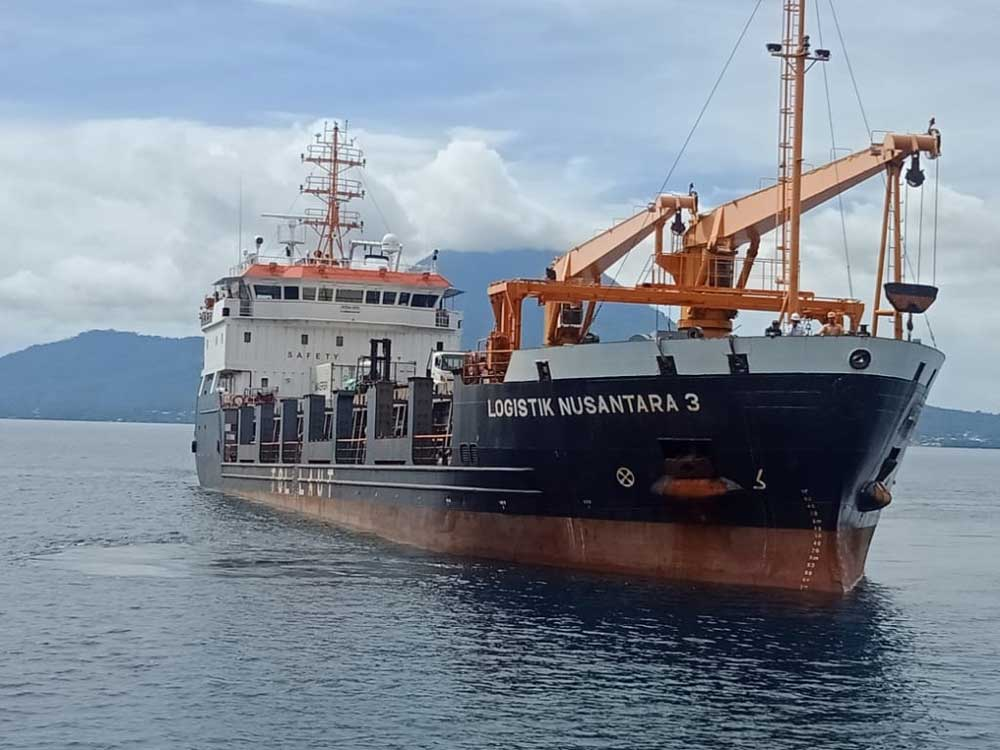
KM Logistik Nusantara 3, one of main container ships

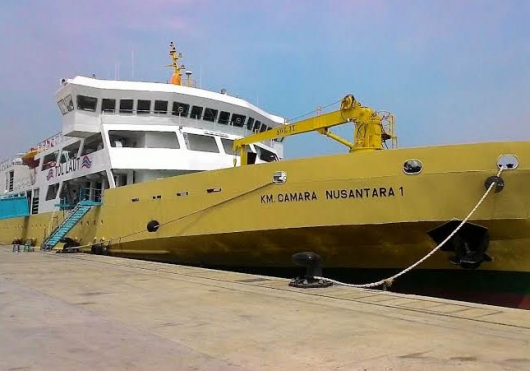
KM Camara Nusantara I, first cattle ship launched on 2015

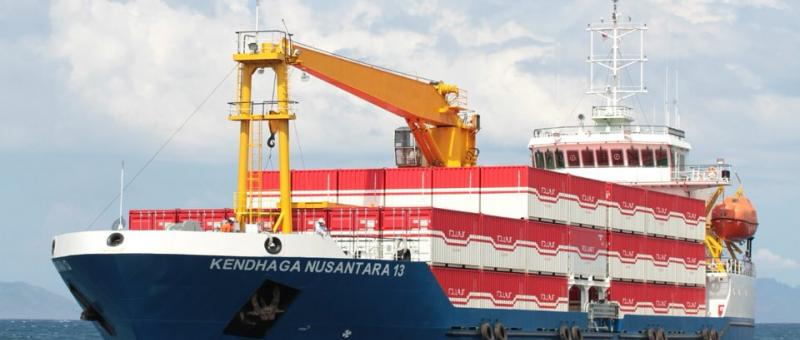
KM Kendhaga Nusantara 13, a feeder ship

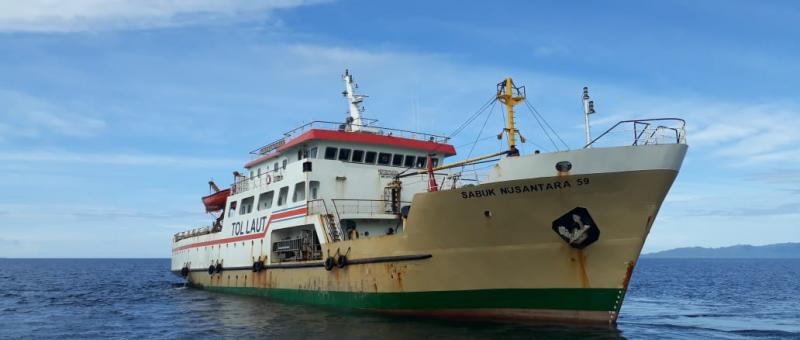
KM Sabuk Nusantara 59, a pioneer ship under the Sea Toll program

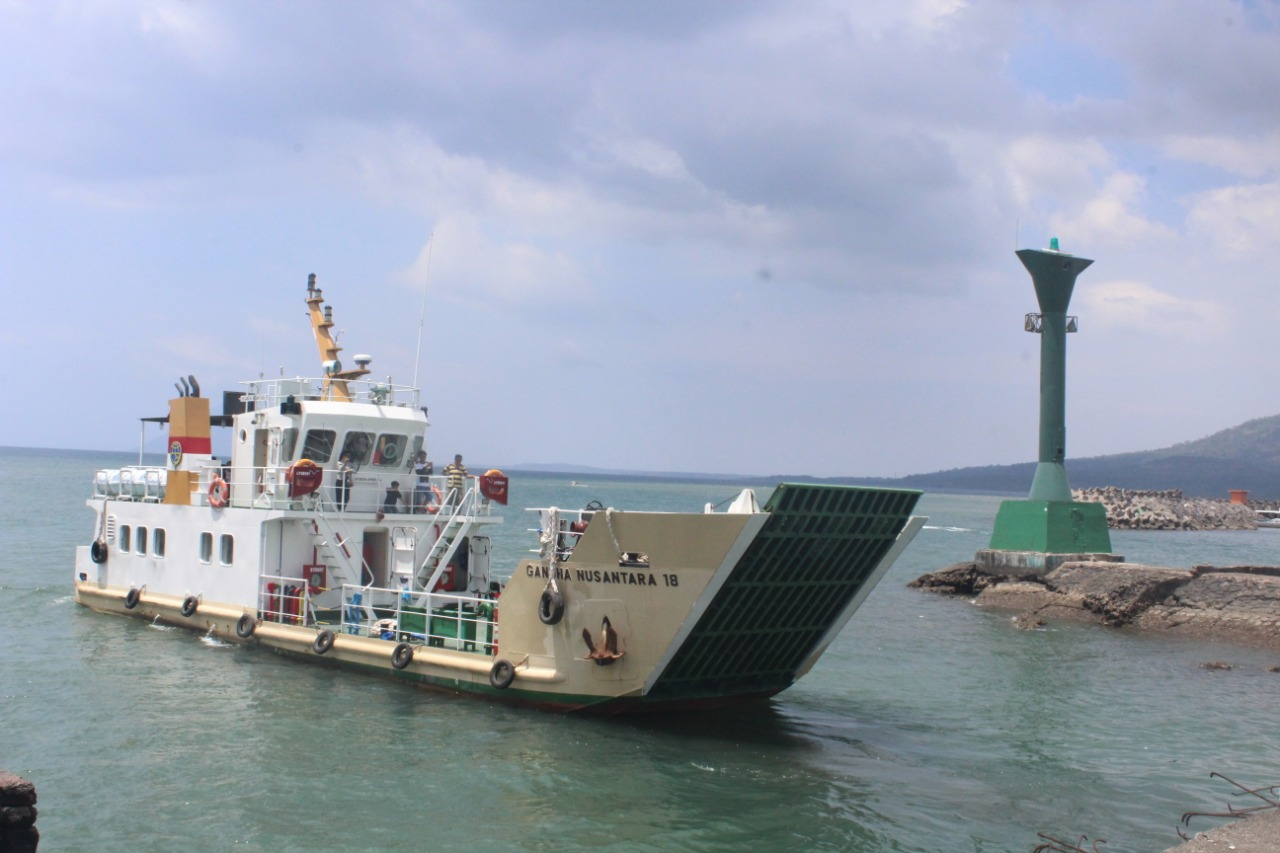
KM Gandha Nusantara 18, open deck ship under the Sea Toll program

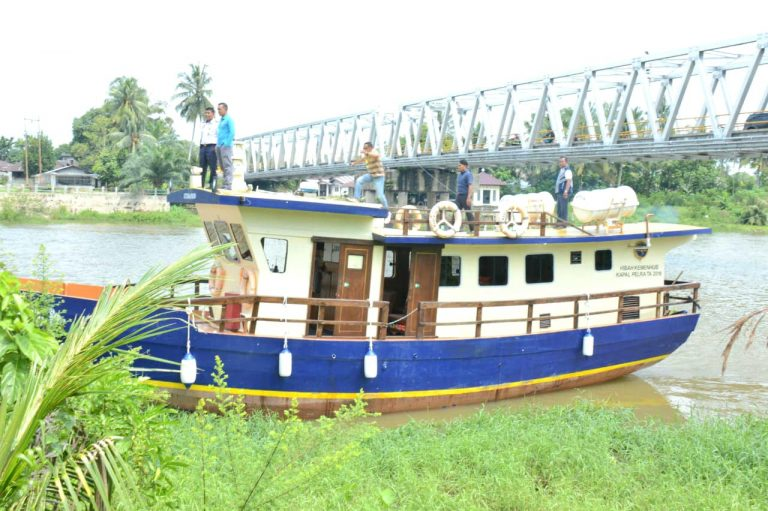
KM Banawa Nusantara 58, a small ship also under the Sea Toll program

Most ships used in this program were purpose-built under the order of the government. Most of the ships are named by its class name followed by order of construction. There are six classes of ships operated under this program. In 2020 there were 116 pioneer ships, 14 container ships, 6 cattle ships, 18 open deck ships, and 138 people's ships.

=== Cattle ship (Camara Nusantara class) ===
Cattle ship (Indonesian: Kapal ternak) is a type of ship used to transport live cattle such as cows, pigs, and goats. This particular ship has widespread use and regular routes to and from West and East Nusa Tenggara. Both provinces have significant cattle populations and industries. This particular type of ship is also equipped with facilities to feed the cattle, cattle pens, veterinarian clinics. and animal quarantine facilities. Each ship is usually capable of carrying up to 500 cows.

=== Main container ship (Logistik Nusantara class) ===
Main container ships are container ships that are capable of carrying up to 100 Twenty-foot Equivalent Units. The minimum docking pier length for this ship is 100m. These are mother ships in the program, usually incapable of reaching smaller ports, which mostly operate between base ports. Because of that, these ships are assisted by feeder ships.

=== Feeder ship (Kendhaga Nusantara class) ===
Feeder ships, or sometimes called connector ships (Indonesian: Kapal penghubung) are smaller versions of main container ships. They also carry fewer and smaller containers.

=== Pioneer ship (Sabuk Nusantara class) ===
Pioneer ships are ships that serve small routes that still have little-to-no commercial value. They carry goods and transport people. They are also used to transport goods from smaller ports to bigger ports and vice versa. These ships are capable of carrying up to around 250-500 people and goods between 200 and 400 tons at the same time.

=== Open deck ship (Gandha Nusantara class) ===
Open deck ships (Indonesian: Kapal rede) are ships specifically built with open deck and open ramp door. Generally similar in size than pioneer ships, they also transport people and goods at the same time. Open deck ships are also used for tourism.

=== People's ship (Banawa Nusantara class) ===
This type of ship usually consist of small boats donated by locals or organizations and operated by local governments. They mostly serve to connect small islands and transport people on a small scale.

== Routes ==
Since 2015, the number of routes has been expanded from 3 to over 26 routes, serving more than 100 ports. Around 50 new ports have also been constructed and the fleet specifically assigned to this program was 293 units in 2020. In 2021, 4 new routes were announced making the total 30 routes. Routes started from base ports (pangkalan) and main container ports in the region before continuing to smaller ports, and then taking the same route back. In 2023, the total routes operational were 39 routes operated both by state-owned companies and private partnerships. In 2024, another three additional new routes were announced. Table below shows information about routes as of 2025.

Cargo routes as of 2025
Route code	Base port	Route destinations	Operator	Distance (nautical miles)
H-1	Tanjung Perak Port	Tanjung Perak - Makassar - Tahuna - Nunukan - Tanjung Perak	PT. PELNI (PERSERO)	2811
H-2	Tanjung Perak Port	Tanjung Perak - Makassar - Bobong (Taliabu) - Malbufa (Sula) - Tanjung Perak	PT. DJAKARTA LLOYD	2191
H-3	Tanjung Priok Port	Tanjung Priok - Teluk Bayur - Tanjung Priok	PT. MERATUS LINE	1124
H-4	Tanjung Perak Port	Tanjung Perak - Sorong - Tanjung Perak	PT. TEMPURAN MAS LINE	2718
H-5	Tanjung Perak Port	Tanjung Perak - Kupang - Ende (Maumbawa) - Tanjung Perak	PT. MERATUS LINE	1421
S-1	Bitung Port	Bitung -Tahuna - Lirung / Melonguane - Bitung	PT. DJAKARTA LLOYD	438
S-2A	Makassar Port	Makassar (Soekamo Hatta) - Ereke - Raha - Sikeli - Makassar (Soekamo Hatta)	PT. DJAKARTA LLOYD	743
S-2B	Makassar Port	Makassar (Soekamo Hatta) - Bungku -Kolonodale - Makassar (Soekamo Hatta)	PT. DJAKARTA LLOYD	1125
S-3	Teluk Bayur Port	Teluk Bayur - Gunung Sitoli - Sinabang - Pulau Baai - Teluk Bayur	PT. SUBSEA LINTAS GLOBALINDO	1165
S-4	Sorong Port	Sorong - Oransbari - Waren - Sarmi - Sorong	PT. PELNI (PERSERO)	1258
S-5A	Kupang Port	Kupang - Rote - Sabu - Kupang	PT. PELNI (PERSERO)	283
S-5B	Kupang Port	Kupang - Larantuka - Lembata (Lewoleba) - Kalabahi - Kupang	PT. PELNI (PERSERO)	988
T-1	Tanjung Priok Port	Tanjung Priok - Lhoksumawe (Aceh Utara) - Malahayati - Tanjung Priok	PT. CITRABARU ADINUSANTARA	2174
T-2	Tanjung Priok Port	Tanjung Priok - Kota Segara/Tanjung Uban - Letung - Tarempa - Selat Lampa - Subi - Serasan - Midai - Kota Segara/Tanjung Uban - Tanjung Priok	PT. PELNI (PERSERO)	1711
T-3	Makassar Port	Makassar (Soekarno Hatta) - Nunukan - Tarakan - Makassar	PT. CITRABARU ADINUSANTARA	1264
T-4	Port of Bitung	Bitung - Pagimana - Bunta - Ampana (Mantangisi) - Parigi - Bitung	PT. DJAKARTA LLOYD	730
T-5	Tanjung Perak Port	Tanjung Perak - Nabire - Serui - Biak - Wasior - Tanjung Perak	PT. TEMPURAN MAS LINE	3782
T-6	Tanjung Perak Port	Tanjung Perak - Tidore - Jailolo - Tanjung Perak	PT. PELNI (PERSERO)	2336
T-7	Tanjung Perak Port	Tanjung Perak - Merauke - Agats - Pomako - Tanjung Perak	PT. TEMPURAN MAS LINE	3631
T-8	Tanjung Perak Port	Tanjung Perak - Kisar - Letti - Moa - Damer (Wulur) - Tanjung Perak	PT. LINTAS SAMUDERA GLOBALINDO	1954
T-9	Tanjung Perak Port	Tanjung Perak - Makassar - Morotai - Galela - Maba - Weda - Tanjung Perak	PT. PELNI (PERSERO)	2845
T-10	Tanjung Perak Port	Tanjung Perak - Wanci - Namrole - Tanjung Perak	PT. SUBSEA LINTAS GLOBALINDO	1821
T-11	Tanjung Perak Port	Tanjung Perak - Saumlaki - Dobo - Tanjung Perak	PT. TEMPURAN MAS LINE	2677
T-12	Tanjung Perak Port	Tanjung Perak - Badas - Bima - Tanjung Perak	PT. MENTARI MAS MULTIMODA	867
T-13	Tanjung Perak Port	Tanjung Perak - Tarakan - Tanjung Perak	PT. MERATUS LINE	1708
T-14	Tanjung Perak Port	Tanjung Perak - Namlea - Tanjung Perak	PT. TEMPURAN MAS LINE	1984
T-15	Biak Port	Biak - Teba - Bagusa - Trimuris - Kasonaweja - Teba - Biak - Brumsi - Biak	PT. ASDP	492
T-16	Merauke Port	Merauke (Kelapa Lima) - Kimaam - Moor - Bade (Mapi) - Gantentiri (Bovendigul) - Merauke (Kelapa Lima)	PT. ASDP	1038
T-17	Merauke Port	Merauke (Kelapa Lima) - Atsy - Agats - Atsy - Senggo - Atsy - Merauke (Kelapa Lima)	PT. ASDP	1084
T-18	Pomako Port	Timika (Pomako) - Atsy - Eci - Atsy - Ewer -Agats - Sawaerma - Mamugu - Timika (Pomako)	PT. ASDP	1220
T-19	Pomako Port	Timika (Pomako) - Agats - Warse - Yosakor - Agats - Ayam - Katew - Agats - Yurfi - Komor - Agats - Timika (Pomako)	PT. ASDP	614
T-20	Biak Port	Biak - Manokwari - Numfor - Biak	PT. ASDP	252
T-21	Tanjung Perak Port	Tanjung Perak - Pulau Obi - Saketa -Tapeleo(Gimea)/Patani - Piru - Tanjung Perak	PT. LUAS LINE	3436
T-22	Tanjung Perak Port	Tanjung Perak - Bula - Elat - Larat - Tepa - Tanjung Perak	PT. LUAS LINE	2704
T-23	Tanjung Perak Port	Tanjung Perak - Reo - Tanjung Perak	PT. MERATUS LINE	1014
T-24	Tanjung Perak Port	Tanjung Perak - Fak-Fak - Kaimana - Tual (Pulau Kur / Tayando Tam) - Dobo - Tanjung Perak	PT. PELNI (PERSERO)	3004
T-25	Tanjung Perak Port	Tanjung Perak - Nunukan - Tanjung Perak	PT. TEMPURAN MAS LINE	1806
T-26	Tanjung Perak Port	Tanjung Perak - Banggai - Tanjung Perak	PT. MENTARI MAS MULTIMODA	1784
T-27	Tanjung Perak Port	Tanjung Perak - Babang - Tanjung Perak	PT. MENTARI MAS MULTIMODA	2172

Besides the cargo routes there is also an increasing network of Pioneer ships - covering smaller ports and taking both passengers and cargo. The majority of the Pioneer ships are operated by private companies, while a minority (30 ships) are operated by Pelni. Shipping route contracting for the private companies is done annually and visible through the Government Good/Services Procurement Policy Institute (LKPP). The routes are planned monthly and subject to variability of the ports called within the route. As of 2025 there are 118 routes as shown in the table below.

Pioneer ship routes as of 2025
Route code	Base port	Route	Operator	Distance
R-1	Sinabang Port	Sinabang → Meulaboh → Sinabang → Tapak Tuan → Pulau Banyak → Singkil → Sinabang	inactive	474
R-2	Calang Port	Calang → Sinabang → Tapak Tuan → Sinabang → Lahewa → Sinabang → Pulau Banyak → Tapak Tuan → Sinabang → Calang	PT. SUBSEA LINTAS GLOBALINDO	933
R-3	Teluk Bayur Port	Teluk Bayur → Sioban → Tua Pejat → Siberut/Mailepet → Sikabuluan → Labuhan Bajau → Sigologolo → Pulau Tello → Teluk Dalam → Sibolga → Teluk Dalam → Pulau Tello → Sigologolo → Air Bangis → Labuhan Bajau → Sikabuluan/Pokai → Siberut/Mailepet → Tua Pejat → Sioban → Teluk Bayur	PT. PELAYARAN KARYA BERKAT MAKMUR	984
R-4	Teluk Bayur Port	Teluk Bayur → Labuhan Bajau → Sikabuluan/Pokai → Muara Saibi → Siberut/Mailepet → Tua Pejat → Teluk Bayur → Sioban → Sikakap → Teluk Bayur → Sikakap → Sioban → Panasahan → Tua Pejat → Teluk Bayur → Sikakap → Teluk Bayur	PT. PELNI (PERSERO)	1015
R-5	Bengkulu Port	Bengkulu → Enggano → Bengkulu or Bengkulu → Enggano → Linau	PT. SEGARA LINTAS BAHARI	220
R-6	Gorontalo Port	Gorontalo → Banggai → Samoya → Falabisahaya → Dofa → Sanana → Namlea → Ambon → Namlea → Sanana → Dofa → Falabisahaya → Samoya → Banggai → Gorontalo	PT. LUAS LINE	1386
R-7	Sri Bintan Pura Port	route A: Tanjung Pinang → Jagoh/Dabo → Pulau Pekanjang → Belinyu → Pulau Pekanjang → Jagoh/Dabo → Tanjung Pinang route B: Tanjung Pinang → Tambelan → Midai → Selat Lampa → Pulau Laut → Seluan → Selat Lampa → Subi → Pulau Panjang → Serasan → Sintete → Tambelan → Pulau Batam → Tanjung Pinang	PT. PELNI (PERSERO)	A: 592 B: 925
R-8	Sri Bayintan Port	Kijang → Tambelan → Pontianak → Serasan → Subi → Selat Lampa → Pulau Laut → Sedanau → Midai → Tarempa → Kuala Maras → Kijang → Sungai Guntung → Tembilahan → Sungai Guntung → Kijang	PT. LINTAS SAMUDERA GLOBALINDO	1113
R-9	Sintete Port	Sintete → Serasan → Subi → Penagi → Pulau Laut → Sedanau → Midai → Tarempa → Letung → Tanjung Pinang → Tambelan → Sintete	PT. SELVI TRANS INDO	1027
R-10	Pontianak Port	Pontianak → Tambelan → Pontianak → Padang Tikar → Telok Batang → Karimata → Ketapang → Manggar → Toboali/Sadar → Manggar → Ketapang → Karimata → Telok Batang → Padang Tikar → Pontianak	PT PELAYARAN KARYA BERKAT MAKMUR	1295
R-11	Kotabaru Port	route A: Kotabaru → Batulicin → Marabatuan → Maradapan → Matasiri → Maradapan → Marabatuan → Batulicin → Kotabaru route B: Kotabaru → Majene → Tanjung Silopo → Kotabaru	PT. PELNI (PERSERO)	A: 252 B: 421
R-12	Kotabaru Port	route A: Kotabaru → Batulicin → Marabatuan → Maradapan → Matasiri → Maradapan → Marabatuan → Batulicin → Kotabaru route B: Kotabaru → Mamuju → Kotabaru	PT. CITRABARU ADINUSANTARA	A: 252 B: 362
R-13	Tarakan Port	Tarakan → Bunyu → Toli Toli → Leok → Kwandang → Leok → Toli Toli → Bunyu → Tarakan	PT PELAYARAN KARYA BERKAT MAKMUR	930
R-14	Semarang Port	Semarang → Jepara → Legonbajak → Teluk Sigintung → Kuala Jelai → Kendawangan → Legonbajak → Semarang	inactive	762
R-15	Tanjung Perak Port	Tanjung Perak → Masalembo → Keramaian → Masalembo → Kalianget → Kangean → Sapeken → Pagerungan Besar → Sapeken → Tanjung Wangi → Sapeken → Pagerungan Besar → Sapeken → Kangean → Kalianget → Masalembo → Keramaian → Masalembo → Tanjung Perak	inactive	1276
R-16	Kalianget Port	Kalianget → Masalembo → Keramaian → Matasiri → Maradapan → Marabatuan → Pelaihari → Batulicin → Kotabaru → Batulicin → Pelaihari → Marabatuan → Maradapan → Matasiri → Keramaian → Masalembo → Kalianget	PT SUBSEA LINTAS GLOBALINDO	702
R-17A	Tanjung Wangi Port	Tanjung Wangi → Sapeken → Pagerungan Besar → Sapeken → Kangean → Sapudi → Kalianget → Sapudi → Kangean → Sapeken → Pagerungan Besar → Sapeken → Tanjung Wangi	PT. PELNI (PERSERO)	
R-17B	Tanjung Perak Port	Tanjung Perak → Masalembo → Keramaian → Masalembo → Kalianget → Sapeken → Tanjung Wangi → Sapeken → Kalianget → Masalembo → Keramaian → Masalembo → Tanjung Perak	PT. PELNI (PERSERO)	1276
R-18	Kalianget Port	Kalianget → Kangean → Sapeken → Celukan Bawang → Labuan Lombok → Badas → Bima → Waikelo → Bima → Badas → Labuan Lombok → Celukan Bawang → Sapeken → Kangean → Kalianget	PT. SELVI TRANS INDO	1220
R-19	Bima Port	route A: Bima → Reo → Jampea → Makassar → Jampea → Reo → Bima route B: Bima → Waikelo → Ende → Raijua → Sabu → Raijua → Ende → Waikelo → Bima	PT. KARUNIA UTAMA ASIA TIMUR	A: 850 B: 790
R-20	Bima Port	Bima → Labuan Lombok → Celukan Bawang → Tanjung Wangi → Sapeken → Kangean → Kalinaget → Kangean → Sapeken → Tanjung Wangi → Celukan Bawang → Labuan Lombok → Bima	PT KARUNIA UTAMA ASIA TIMUR	1180
R-21	Bima Port	Bima → Calabai → Labuhan Lombok → Sailus → Sapuka → Balobaloang Besar → Makassar → Balobaloang Besar → Sapuka→ Sailus → Labuhan Lombok → Calabai → Bima	inactive	1136
R-22	Bima Port	Bima → Labuan Bajo → Bonerate → Selayar → Makassar → Selayar → Bonerate → Labuan Bajo → Bima	PT. NUSANTARA TIMUR LINE	1052
R-23	Kupang Port	Kupang → Ndao → Sabu → Raijua → Ende → Pulau Ende → Maumbawa → Waiwole → Mamboro → Waingapu → Mamboro → Waiwole → Maumbawa → Pulau Ende → Ende → Raijua → Sabu → Ndao → Kupang	PT. PELNI (PERSERO)	894
R-24	Kupang Port	Kupang → Naikliu → Wini → Lirang → Ilwaki → Kisar → Romang → Leti → Lakor → Luang / Pulau Kelapa → Sermata (Elo) → Tepa → Kroing → Saumlaki → Kroing → Tepa → Sermata (Elo) → Luang / P. Kelapa → Lakor → Leti → Romang → Kisar → Ilwaki → Lirang → Wini → Naikliu → Kupang	inactive	1364
R-25	Kupang Port	Kupang → Naikliu → Mananga → Lewoleba → Balauring → Baranusa → Kalabahi → Atapupu → Kalabahi → Baranusa → Balauring → Lewoleba → Mananga → Naikliu → Kupang	PT. PELNI (PERSERO)	810
R-26	Kupang Port	Kupang → Wulandoni → Mananga → Maumere → Palue → Maurole → Marapokot → Reo → Labuan Bajo → Bima → Labuan Bajo → Reo → Marapokot → Maurole → Palue → Maumere → Mananga → Wulandoni → Kupang	PT. SELVI TRANS INDO	926
R-27	Kupang Port	Kupang → Kalabahi → Lirang → Ilwaki → Kisar → Leti → Moa → Tepa → Kroing → Saumlaki → Kroing → Tepa → Moa → Leti → Kisar → Ilwaki → Lirang → Kalabahi → Kupang	PT. BAHTERA LOGISTIK NUSANTARA	1468
R-28	Laurentius Say Port	Maumere → Larantuka → Waiwerang → Wulandoni → Lewoleba → Balauring → Baranusa → Kalabahi → Maritaing → Atapupu → Kupang → Atapupu → Marataing → Kalabahi → Baranusa → Balauring → Lewoleba → Wulandoni → Waiwerang → Larantuka → Maumere	PT. PELAYARAN WIRAYUDA MARITIM	1044
R-29	Laurentius Say Port	Maumere → Palue → Maurole → Marapokot → Reo → Labuan Bajo → Bima → Labuan Bajo → Reo → Marapokot → Maurole → Palue → Maumere	inactive	542
R-30	Reo Port	route A: Reo → Marapokot → Maumere → Marapokot → Reo route B: Reo → Bonerate → Selayar → Makassar → Selayar → Bonerate → Reo	PT. JAVA SHIPPING LINES	A: 280 B: 660
R-31	Laurentius Say Port	Maumere → Pemana → Batuata → Batuaga(Bau-Bau) → Pasar Wajo → Wanci → Kendari → Wanci → Pasar Wajo → Batuaga → Batuata → Pemana → Maumere	PT CITRABARU ADINUSANTARA	726
R-32	Laurentius Say Port	Maumere → Larantuka → Lamakera → Kalabahi → Maritaing → Lirang → Ilwaki → Romang → Kisar → Moa → Leti → Moa → Kisar → Romang → Ilwaki → Lirang → Maritaing → Kalabahi → Lamakera → Larantuka → Maumere	PT. NUSANTARA TIMUR LINE	1062
R-33	Waingapu Port	Waingapu → Waikelo → Labuan Bajo → Bima → Labuhan Lombok → Benoa → Labuhan Lombok → Bima → Labuan Bajo → Waikelo → Waingapu	PT. NUSANTARA TIMUR LINE	1004
R-34	Waingapu Port	Waingapu → Salura → Raijua → Sabu → Ndoa → Batutua → Kupang → Wulandoni → Larantuka → Wulandoni → Kupang → Batutua → Ndao → Sabu → Raijua → Salura → Waingapu	PT. PELAYARAN MANDALA SEJAHTERA ABADI	928
R-35	Bitung Port	Bitung → Makalehi → Para → Ngalipaeng → Petta → Damau → Lirung → Dapalan → Kakorotan → Karatung → Miangas → Melonguane → Damau → Tahuna → Kalama → Tagulandang → Likupang → Bitung	PT. PELNI (PERSERO)	
R-36	Bitung Port	Bitung → Likupang → Biaro → Tagulandang → Buhias → Ulu Siau → Pehe → Makalehi → Para → Kahakitang → Para → Makalehi → Pehe → Ulu Siau → Buhias → Tagulandang → Biaro → Likupang → Bitung	PT JAVA SHIPPING LINES	364
R-37	Tahuna Port	Tahuna → Petta → Bukide → Lipang → Kawaluso → Matutuang → Kawio → Marore → Kawio → Matutuang → Kawaluso → Lipang → Bukide → Petta → Tahuna	PT. PELNI (PERSERO)	278
R-38	Tahuna Port	Tahuna → Mangaran → Lirung → Melonguane → Dapalan → Kakorotan → Miangas → Kakorotan → Essang → Beo → Melonguane → Lirung → Mangaran → Bitung → Tahuna	PT. PELAYARAN MANDALA SEJAHTERA ABADI	842
R-39	Tahuna Port	Tahuna → Kawaluso → Matutuang → Kawio → Marore → Kawio → Matutuang → Kawaluso → Tahuna → Bitung → Tahuna	PT. PELAYARAN MANDALA SEJAHTERA ABADI	
R-40	Gorontalo Port	Gorontalo → Bunta → Bualemo → Bobong → Bualemo → Bunta → Gorontalo	PT. NUSANTARA TIMUR LINE	772
R-41	Gorontalo Port	Gorontalo → Luwuk → Mansalean → Bobong/Talo → Lede → Tikong → Ternate → Tikong → Lede → Bobong/Talo → Mansalean → Luwuk → Gorontalo	PT PELAYARAN WIRAYUDA MARITIM	1086
R-42	Timaluta Port	Tilamuta → Bualemo → Banggai → Raha → Batauga → Makassar → Batauga → Raha → Banggai → Bualemo → Bumbulan → Tilamuta	PT PELAYARAN KARYA BERKAT MAKMUR	1411
R-43	Kwandang Port	Kwandang → Paleleh → Leok → Toli Toli → Tarakan → Nunukan → Pulau Sebatik → Nunukan → Tarakan → Toli Toli → Leok → Paleleh → Kwandang	PT. PELNI (PERSERO)	1186
R-44	Mamuju Port	route A: Mamuju → Pulau Ambo → Pulau Popoongan → Pulau Salissingan → Balikpapan → Pulau Salissingan → Pulau Popoongan → Pulau Ambo → Mamuju route B: Mamuju → Budong Budong → Bontang → Budong Budong → Mamuju	PT. GERBANG SAMUDRA SARANA	A: 428 B: 524
R-45	Poso Port	Poso → Wakai → Una-una → Gorontalo → Bitung → Gorontalo Una-una → Wakai → Poso	inactive	778
R-46	Poso Port	Poso → Mantangisi → Wakai → Una-una → Malenge → Popolii → Pasokan → Gorontalo → Bitung → Gorontalo → Pasokan → Popolii → Malenge → Una-una → Wakai → Mantangisi → Poso	PT. NUSANTARA TIMUR LINE	
R-47	Wani Port	Wani → Donggala → Samarinda → Ogoamas → Toli Toli → Tarakan → Toli Toli → Oagamas → Samaringa → Donggala → Wani	PT. LINTAS SAMUDERA GLOBALINDO	1316
R-48	Wani Port	Wani → Donggala → Wani → Ogoamas → Malala → Toli-Toli → Leok → Lokodidi → Paleleh → Kwandang → Labuhan Uki → Kwandang → Paleleh → Lokodidi → Leok → Toli-Toli → Malala → Ogoamas → Wani → Donggala → Wani	inactive	1036
R-49	Pagimana Port	Pagimana → Gorontalo → Banggai → Bobong → Bitung → Falabisahaya → Bitung → Bobong → Banggai → Gorontalo → Pagimana	PT. GERBANG SAMUDRA SARANA	
R-50	Tobelo Port	route A: Tobelo → Buli → Bicoli → Tepeleo → Gebe → Tepeleo → Bicoli → Buli → Tobelo route B: Tobelo → Darume → Dama → Kedi → Mayau → Bitung → Mayau → Kedi → Dama → Darume → Tobelo	PT. SUBSEA LINTAS GLOBALINDO	
R-51	Kolonedale Port	Kolonedale → Bungku → Menui → Kendari → Menui → Bungku → Kolonedale → Baturube → Banggai → Bobong → Banggai → Baturube → Kolonedale	PT. LINTAS SAMUDERA GLOBALINDO	884
R-52	Parigi Port	Parigi → Mantangisi → Una-una → Wakai → Malenge → Popolii → Pasokan → Gorontalo → Pasokan → Pagimana → Pasokan → Popolii → Malenge → Wakai → Una-una → Mantangisi → Parigi	PT. LINTAS SAMUDERA GLOBALINDO	1225
R-53	Ampana Port	Ampana → Gorontalo → Bunta → Pasokan → Popolii → Malenge → Wakai → Ampana → Una-una → Parigi → Una-una → Ampana → Wakai → Malenge → Popolii → Pasokan → Bunta → Gorontalo → Ampana	PT. LINTAS SAMUDERA GLOBALINDO	
R-54	Kendari Port	Kendari → Langara → Waodeburi → Pasar Wajo → Bau Bau → Pola → Banggai → Bobong → Sanana → Obi → Sanana → Bobong → Banggai → Pola → Bau Bau → Pasar Wajo → Waodeburi → Langara → Kendari	PT. SELVI TRANS INDO	1490
R-55	Kendari Port	Kendari → Wanci → Tomia → Batauga → Bau Bau → Liana Banggai → Talaga → Sikeli → Pomalaa → Bulukumba → Pomalaa → Sikeli → Talaga → Liana Banggai → Bau Bau → Batauga → Tomia → Wanci → Kandari	?	1206
R-56	Kendari Port	Kendari → Langara → Waodeburi → Pasar Wajo → Wanci → Kaledupa → Tomia → Binongko → Kalabahi → Binongko → Tomia → Kaledupa → Wanci → Pasar Wajo → Waodeburi → Langara → Kendari	PT. JAVA SHIPPING LINES	1066
R-57	Kendari Port	Kendari → Bobong → Tikong → Banggai → Luwuk → Ampana → Gorontalo → Ampana → Luwuk → Banggai → TIkong → Bobong → Kendari	PT. PELNI (PERSERO)	1392
R-58	Makassar Port	route A: Makassar → Selayar → Jampea → Makassar route B: Makassar → Maccini Baji → Dewakang Lompo → Pulau Kalukalukuang → Pulau Pamantuang → Pulau Kalukalukuang → Dewakang Lompo → Maccini Baji → Makassar	PT. SUBSEA LINTAS GLOBALINDO	A: 453 B: 378
R-59	Makassar Port	Makassar → Bentaeng → Selayar → Jinato → Kayuadi → Jampea → Bonerate → Kalaotoa → Maumere → Kalaotoa → Bonerate → Jampea → Kayuadi → Jinato → Selayar → Bentaeng → Makassar	PT. PELNI (PERSERO)	840
R-60	Makassar Port	route A: Makassar → Maccini Baji → Dewakang Lompo → Pulau Marasende → Pulau Doangdoangan Lompo → Pulau Doangdoangan Caddi → Pulau Kalukalukuang → Pulau Pammantauang → Pulau Sabaru → Pulau Kalukalukuang → Pulau Doangdoangan Caddi → Pulau Doangdoangan Lompo → Maccini Baji → Makassar route B: Makassar → Maccini Baji → Pulau Balobaloang Lompo → Pulau Sumanga → Pulau Matalaang → Pulau Sapuka → Tampaang → Pulau Sailus Lompo → Pulau Kapoposang Bali → Badas → Pulau Kapoposang Bali → Pulau Sailus Lompo → Tampaang → Pulau Sapuka → Pulau Matalaang → Pulau Sumanga → Pulau Balobaloang Lompo → Maccini Baji → Makassar	PT. PELNI (PERSERO)	A: 450 B: 814
R-61	Ternate Port	route A: Ternate → Soasio → Gita → Tomara → Bisui → Mafa → Weda → Mesa → Banemo → Patani → Gebe → Patani → Banemo → Mesa → Weda → Mafa → Bisui → Tomara → Gita → Soasio → Ternate route B: Ternate → Mayau → Tifure → Bitung → Tifure → Mayau → Ternate	PT. AKSAR SAPUTRA LINES	A: 736 B: 334
R-62	Ternate Port	route A: Ternate → Jailolo → Tobelo → Wasileo → Buli → Maba → Bicoli → Peniti → Tapaleo → Gebe → Tapaleo → Peniti → Bicoli → Maba → Buli → Wasileo → Tobelo → Jailolo → Ternate route B: Ternate → Mayau → Tifure → Bitung → Tifure → Mayau → Ternate	PT. SURYA BAHTERA MARITIM	A: 760 B: 334
R-63	Ternate Port	route A: Ternate → Pigaraja → Madapolo → Laiwui → Sanana → Dofa → Tikong → Lede → Bobong → Lede → Tikong → Dofa → Sanana → Laiwui → Madapolo → Pigaraja → Ternate route B: Ternate → Jailolo → Mayau → Bitung → Mayau → Jailolo → Ternate	PT. PELNI (PERSERO)	A: 988 B: 320
R-64	Ternate Port	route A: Ternate → Pulau Dowora → Gane Dalam → Sekeli → Sum → Tobalai/Wooi → Fluk → Wayaloar → Gumumu/Manu → Buano → Ambon → Buano → Gumumu/Manu → Wayaloar → Fluk → Tobalai.Wooi → Sum → Sekeli → Gane Dalam → Pulau Dowora → Ternate route B: Ternate → Mayau → Tifure → Bitung → Tifure → Mayau → Ternate	PT. PELNI (PERSERO)	A: 828 B: 334
R-65	Babang Port	route A: Babang → Bibinoi → Pigaraja → Pasipalele → Gane Dalam → Bisui → Mafa → Bisui → Gane Dalam → Pasipalele → Pigaraja → Bibinoi → Babang route B: Babang → Saketa → Yaba → Kayoa → Makian → Bitung → Makian → Kayoa → Yaba → Saketa → Babang	PT. KARUNIA UTAMA ASIA TIMUR	A: 332 B: 520
R-66	Babang Port	route A: Babang → Saketa → Kayoa → Makian → Ternate → Makian → Kayoa → Saketa → Babang route B: Babang → Torobi → Kofiau → Pam → Sorong → Pam → Kofiau → Torobi → Babang	PT. CITRA MAKMUR	A: 390 B: 520
R-67	Sanana Port	route A: Sanana → Pasipa → Loseng → Bobong → Bitung → Bobong → Loseng → Pasipa → Sanana route B: Sanana → Namlea → Ambon → Namlea → Sanana	PT. PELAYARAN MANDALA SEJAHTERA ABADI	A: 666 B: 324
R-68	Sanana Port	Sanana → Malbufa → Dofa → Falabisahaya → Tikong → Lede → Bobong → Kendari → Bobong → Lede → Tikong → Falabisahaya → Dofa → Malbufa → Sanana	PT. PELAYARAN MANDALA SEJAHTERA ABADI	678
R-69	Ambon Port	Ambon → Banda → Geser → Gorom → Kesui → Pulau Teor → Pulau Kur → Tual → Pulau Kur → Pulau Teor → Kesui → Gorom → Geser → Werinama → Banda → Amahai → Banda → Ambon	PT. PELNI (PERSERO)	1031
R-70	Ambon Port	Ambon → Banda → Tual → Molu → Sofyanin → Larat → Wunlah → Saumlaki → Marsela → Kroing/Letwurung → Dawera/Dawelor → Lewa/Dai → Tepa → Pulau Wetang/Herley → Lelang/Elo → Lakor → Moa → Leti → Kisar/Wonreli → Arwala/Sutilarang → Romang → Wulur → Ambon	PT. CITRABARU ADINUSANTARA	1296
R-71	Ambon Port	Ambon → Kumber/Banda → Tual → Elat → Banda Eli → Dobo → Banda Eli → Elat → Tual → Toyando → Pulau Kur → Pulau Kaimer → Kumber/Banda → Ambon	PT. CITRABARU ADINUSANTARA	811
R-72	Ambon Port	Ambon → Tual → Elat → Molu → Larat → Rumean/ Sofyanin → Saumlaki → Adaut → Seira → Dawera/Dawelor → Kroing → Tepa → Marsela → Saumlaki → Sofyanin/ Rumean → Larat → Molu → Elat → Tual → Ambon	inactive	1502
R-73	Ambon Port	Ambon → Wulur → Tepa → Lelang/Elo → Lakor → Moa → Leti → Kisar → Ilwaki → Aimau → Lirang → Kupang → Lirang → Aimau → Ilwaki → Kisar → Leti → Moa → Lakor → Lelang/Elo → Tepa → Wulur → Ambon	PT. KAWAN BERSAMA LOGISTIK	1560
R-74	Ambon Port	Ambon → Tehoru → Werinama → Kelmuri → Geser → Bula → Gorom → Kesui → Pulau Teor → Kesui → Gorom → Bula → Geser → Kelmuri → Weinama → Tehoru → Ambon	PT. PELNI (PERSERO)	882
R-75	Ambon Port	Ambon → Amahai → Serua → Nila → Teon → Batu Merah → Wulur → Romang → Kisar → Leti → Moa → Lakor → Luang/Pulau Tamta → Lelang/Elo → Tepa → Leaw/Dai → Dawera/Dawelor → Kroing → Marsela → Saumlaki → Tual → Ambon	PT. PELNI (PERSERO)	1332
R-76	Ambon Port	Ambon → Ambalau → Wamsisi → Namrole → Leksula → Tifu → Waimulang → Nanali/Fogi → Waimulang → Tifu → Leksula → Namrole → Wamsisi → Ambalau → Ambon	PT. KAWAN BERSAMA LOGISTIK	340
R-77	Ambon Port	Ambon → Waisala → Buano → Taniwel → Wahai → Kobisadar → Bula → Waigama → Sorong → Waigama → Bula → Kobisadar → Wahai → Taniwel → Buano → Waisala → Ambon	PT. BAHTERA LOGISTIK NUSANTARA	834
R-78	Tual Port	Tual → Tayando → Pulau Kur → Kaimer → Teor → Kesui → Gorom → Pulau Amarsekaru → Geser → Bula → Fak Fak → Bula → Geser → Pulau Amarsekaru → Gorom → Kesui → Teor → Kaimer → Pulau Kur → Tayando → Tual	PT. SINAR PERMATA TIMUR	768
R-79	Tual Port	route A: Tual → Banda Eli → Elat → Tual route B: Tual → Toyando → Pulau Tam → Fadol → Pulau Mangur → Pulau Kur → Kaimer → Teor → Kesui → Pulau Kumber → Ambon → Pulau Kumber → Kesui → Teor → Kaimer → Pulau Kur → Pulau Mangur → Fadol → Pulau Tam → Toyando → Tual	PT. KAWAN BERSAMA LOGISTIK	A: 93 B: 746
R-80	Tual Port	Tual → Dobo → Mariasi → Kojabi → Warabal → Longar → Meror → Batu Goyang → Serwatu → Taberfane → Benjina → Dobo → Tual	inactive	566
R-81	Tual Port	route A: Tual → Dobo → Tual route B: Tual → Tayando → Pulau Tam → Pulau Mangur → Pulau Kur → Kaimer → Teor → Kesui → Gorom → Geser → Bula → Geser → Gorom → Kesui → Teor → Kaimer → Pulau Kur → Pulau Mangur → Pulau Tam → Tayando → Tual	PT. SINAR PERMATA TIMUR	A: 216 B: 550
R-82	Tual Port	Tual → Dobo → Larat → Saumlaki → Marsela → Kroing → Dawera/Dawelor → Tepa → Luang → Moa → Romang → Kisar → Romang → Moa → Luang → Tepa → Dawera/Dawelor → Kroing → Marsela → Saumlaki → Larat → Dobo → Tual	PT. GERBANG SAMUDRA SARANA	980
R-83	Tual Port	Tual → Dobo → Larat → Saum laki → Marsela → Kroing → Dawera/Dawelor → Kroing → Marsela → Saumlaki → Larat → Dobo → Tual	inactive	1042
R-84	Saumlaki Port	Saumlaki → Seira → Nurkat → Molu → Larat → Sofyanin/Rumean → Tual → Dobo → Timika/Pomako → Dobo → Tual → Sofyanin/Rumean → Larat → Molu → Nurkat → Seira → Saumlaki	PT. INTI SAMUDERA TIMUR	1216
R-85	Saumlaki Port	Saumlaki → Tutukembong → Larat → Molu → Teon → Nila → Serua → Amahai → Ambon → Molu → Larat → Tutukembong → Saumlaki	PT. PELAYARAN KARYA BERKAT MAKMUR	1100
R-86	Saumlaki Port	Saumlaki → Dawera/Dawelor → Kroing → Marsela → Tepa → Wulur → Lelang/Elo → Lakor → Moa → Leti → Kisar → Romang → Arwala/Sutilarang → Lerokis → Eray → Lirang → Kalabahi → Kupang → Kalabahi → Lirang → Eray → Lerokis → Arwala/Sutilarang → Romang → Kisar → Leti → Moa → Lakor → Lelang/Elo → Wulur → Tepa → Marsela → Kroing → Dawera/Dawelor Saumlaki	PT. PELNI (PERSERO)	1524
R-87	Saumlaki Port	Saumlaki → Kroing → Marsela → Tepa → Wulur → Lelang/Elo → Moa → Leti → Kisar → Lerokis → Eray/Upisera → Kalabahi → Eray/Upisera → Lerokis → Kisar → Leti → Moa → Lelang/Elo → Wulur → Tepa → Marsela → Kroing → Saumlaki	inactive	1164
R-88	Kalabahi Port	Kalabahi → Kupang → Naikliu → Wini → Ilwaki → Kisar → Romang → Leti → Moa → Lakor → Luang → Mahaleta → Herley/Wetang → Kroing → Marsela → Saumlaki → Marsela → Kroing → Herley/Wetang → Mahaleta → Luang → Lakor → Moa → Leti → Romang → Kisar → Ilwaki → Wini → Naikliu → Kupang → Kalabahi	PT. PELAYARAN KARYA BERKAT MAKMUR	1620
R-89	Saumlaki Port	Saumlaki → Dawera/Dawelor → Kroing → Moa → Leti → Kisar → Romang → Arwala → Lerokis → Eray → Kalabahi → Kupang → Kalabahi → Eray → Lerokis → Arwala → Romang → Kisar → Leti → Moa → Kroing → Dawera/Dawelor → Saumlaki	PT. PERUSAHAAN PELAYARAN INTI IRAMA LINES	1324
R-90	Saumlaki	Saumlaki → Dawera/Dawelor → Kroing → Moa → Leti → Kisar → Romang→ Arwala → Lerokis → Eray/Upisera → Kalabahi → Kupang → Kalabahi → Eray/Upisera → Lerokis → Arwala → Romang → Kisar → Leti → Moa → Tepa → Kroing → Dawera/Dawelor → Saumlaki	inactive	1324
R-91	Saumlaki Port	Saumlaki → Adaut → Seira → Pulau Wotar → Wunlah → Labobar → Teneman → Larat → Molu → Banda → Ambon → Banda → Molu → Larat → Teneman → Labobar → Wunlah → Pulau Wotar → Seira → Adaut → Saumlaki	PT. INTI IRAMA LINES	914
R-92	Jayapura Port	Jayapura → Depapre → Kaipuri → Dawai → Serui → Waren → Nabire → Wasior → Manokwari → Biak → Manokwari → Wasior → Nabire → Waren → Serui → Dawai → Kaipuri → Depapre → Jayapura	PT. PELNI (PERSERO)	1604
R-93	Jayapura Port	Jayapura → Depapre → Pulau Wakde → Sarmi → Pulau Liki → Teba → D.Rombebai → Trimuris → Kasonaweja → Trimuris → D.Rombebai → Teba → Pulau Liki → Sarmi → Pulau Wakde → Depapre → Jayapura	PT. BAYU BAHARI NUSANTARA LINE	746
R-94	Jayapura Port	Jayapura → Teba → Puiway → Waren → Serui → Biak → Wapoga → Napan → Nabire → Yaur → Teluk Umar → Napan → Wapoga → Biak → Serui → Waren → Puiway → Teba → Jayapura	PT. PELNI (PERSERO)	1264
R-95	Jayapura Port	Jayapura → Depapre → Teba → Kurudu → Waren → Serui → Wooi → Miosnum → Poom → Biak → Numfor → Manokwari → Numfor → Biak → Poom → Miosnum → Wooi → Serui → Waren → Kurudu → Teba → Depapre → Jayapura	PT. BAYU BAHARI NUSANTARA LINE	1252
R-96	Jayapura Port	Jayapura → Sarmi → Teba → Dawai → Waren → Serui → Ansus → Wooi → Miosnum → Poom → Windesi → Tindaret → Biak → Tindaret → Windesi → Poom → Miosnum → Wooi → Ansus → Serui → Waren → Dawai → Teba → Sarmi → Jayapura	PT. PELNI (PERSERO)	1012
R-97	Biak Port	route A: Biak → Windesi → Poom → Wooi → Ansus → Serui → Dawai → Kaipuri → Dawai → Serui → Ansus → Wooi → Poom → Windesi →Biak route B: Biak → Korido → Saribi → Manokwari → Saribi → Korido → Biak route C: Biak → Pulau Insobabi → Miosbipondi → Pulau Mapia → Miosbipondi → Pulau Insobabi → Biak	PT. PELNI (PERSERO)	A: 472 B: 288 C: 376
R-98	Biak Port	Biak → Pulau Wundi → Pulau Mbromsi → Biak → Korido → Saribi → Manokwari → Windesi → Wasior → Teluk Umar → Nabire → Wapoga → Waren → Kaipuri → Dawai → Serui → Ansus → Poom → Biak	PT. PELNI (PERSERO)	745
R-99	Biak Port	route A: Biak → Korido → Yenggarbun → Miosbipondi → Pulau Mapia → Miosbipondi → Yenggarbun → Korido →Biak route B: Biak → Saribi → Manokwari → Saribi → Biak route C: Biak → Poom → Wooi → Ansus → Serui → Waren → Pulau Moor → Napan/Wainami → Pulau Nambor → Nabire → Wasior → Manokwari → Saribi → Biak	PT. BERKAT JAYA MULIA	A: 450 B: 270 C: 689
R-100	Merauke Port	Merauke → Kimaam → Atsy → Kanami → Eci → Sagoni → Jinak → Binam → Senggo → Binam → Jinak → Sagoni → Eci → Kanami → Atsy → Kimaam → Merauke	PT. SUBSEA LINTAS GLOBALINDO	1450
R-101	Merauke Port	Merauke → Kimaam → Moor → Kepi → Tagemon → Ikisi → Boma → Ikisi → Tagemon → Kepi → Moor → Kimaam → Merauke	PT. SUBSEA LINTAS GLOBALINDO	1146
R-102	Merauke Port	Merauke → Wanam → Atsy → Eci → Agats → Sawaerma → Agats → Eci → Atsy → Wanam → Merauke	inactive	1182
R-103	Merauke Port	Merauke → Wanam → Etsy → Ecy → Waganu → Wowi → Suator → Senggo → Suator → Wowi → Waganu → Ecy → Etsy → Wanam → Merauke	PT. BAHTERA LOGISTIK NUSANTARA	1522
R-105	Merauke Port	Merauke → Wanam → Bade → Agats → Pomako → Agats → Bade → Wanam → Merauke	PT. SUBSEA LINTAS GLOBALINDO	1284
R-106	Merauke Port	Merauke → Wanam → Bade → Mur → Kepi → Mur → Bade → Wanam → Merauke	PT. BAHTERA LOGISTIK NUSANTARA	784
R-107	Merauke Port	Merauke → Buraka → Kumbis → Moi → Kimaam → Wanam → Tabonji → Wantarma → Tabonji → Wanam → Kimaam → Moi → Kumbis → Buraka → Merauke	PT. BAHTERA LOGISTIK NUSANTARA	768
R-108	Manokwari Port	route A: Manokwari → Oransbari → Numfor → Biak → Numfor → Manokwari B: Manokwari → Oransbari → Yamakan → Yende → Windesi → Wasior → Windesi → Yende → Yamakan → Oransbari → Manokwari	PT. PELNI (PERSERO)	A: 321 B: 344
R-109	Manokwari Port	route A: Manokwari → Ooransbari → Numfor → Biak → Numfor → Manokwari route B: Manokwari → Oransbari → Yembekiri → Yamakan → Sabubar → Yende → Asemdane → Windesi → Wasior → Windesi → Asemdane → Yende → Sabubar → Yamakan → Yembekiri → Oransbari → Manokwari	PT. SINAR PERMATA TIMUR	A: 321 B: 446
R-110	Manokwari Port	Manokwari → Saukorem → Wanden → Waibem → Wau → Warmandi → Saubeba → Kwoor → Hopmare → Werur → Sausopor → Mega → Sorong → Mega → Sausopor → Werur → Hopmare → Kwoor → Saubeba → Warmandi → Wau → Waibem → Wanden → Saukorem → Manokwari	PT. PELNI (PERSERO)	554
R-111	Manokwari Port	Manokwari → Saukorem → Sausapor → Mega → Sorong → Fak Fak → Karas → Kaimana → Karas → Fak Fak → Sorong → Mega → Sausopor → Saukorem → Manokwari	PT. PELNI (PERSERO)	1202
R-112	Sorong Port	Sorong → Yellu → Bula → Geser → Gorom → Fak Fak → Karas → Kaimana → Lobo → Warifi → Pomako → Warifi → Lobo → Kaimana → Karas → Fak Fak → Gorom → Geser → Bula → Yellu → Sorong	PT. PELNI (PERSERO)	1778
R-113	Sorong Port	Sorong → Arefi → Selfele → Pulau Gag → Kofiau → Weigem → Sorong	PT. BERKAT BERJAYA MULIA	302
R-114	Sorong Port	A: Sorong → Sausopor → Sorong B: Sorong → Kofiau → Waigama → Aduwey → Lilinta → Fafanlaf → Lilinta → Aduwey → Waigana → Atkari → Linmalas → Folley → Dulbatan → Seget → Waliam → Sorong	PT. SELVI TRANS INDO	A: 144 B: 441
R-115	Sorong Port	route A: Sorong → Waisai → Kabare → Pulau Ayu → Pulau Fani → Pulau Ayu → Kabare → Waisai → Sorong route B: Sorong → Teminabuan → Kais → Matemani → Mugim → Inawatan → Kokoda → Inawatan → Mugim → Matemani → Kais → Teminabuan → Sorong	PT CITRABARU ADINUSANTARA	A: 428 B: 536
R-116	Sorong Port	Sorong → Bintuni → Babo → Kokas → Fak Fak → Karas → Kaimana → Karas → Fak Fak → Kokas → Babo → Bintuni → Sorong	PT. PELNI (PERSERO)	1248
R-117	Sorong Port	Sorong → Yellu → Bula → Fak Fak → Kokas → Sagan/Otoweri → Tofoi → Babo → Bintuni → Babo → Tofoi → Sagan/Otoweri → Kokas → Fak Fak → Bula → Yellu → Teminabuan → Seget → Sorong	PT. SURYA BAHTERA MARITIM	1090
R-118	Sorong Port	Sorong → Bula → Geser → Gorom → Kesui → Fak Fak → Kaimana → Pomako → Dobo → Pomako → Kaimana → Fak Fak → Kesui → Gorom → Geser → Bula → Sorong	PT. SURYA BAHTERA MARITIM	2134

== Effect ==
In 2017, an analysis showed a positive impact in the form of a decrease in the price index value chart for price commodities, namely cooking oil by an average of 4.652% and beef by an average of 4.85%. In East Nusa Tenggara, cement price decreased more than 50% per sack in the same year. In Rote Ndao Regency, an average decrease of 11-20% of grocery prices such as chicken meat, cooking oil, egg, and rice. In Tidore and Fakfak Regency, the price of basic goods decreased by 14% and 10% respectively. Pelni, a national shipping company, saw return freight increase by 147% in 2020, potentially creating new business opportunities for entrepreneurs and businesses from isolated regions. In 2017, the price of frozen chicken on the island of Morotai decreased from Rp 40,000 to Rp 34,000. On the same year in Merauke, price of wheat flour decreased from Rp 185,000 per 25 kilograms down to Rp 172,000. In 2018, it was noted that the program decreases reliance of border regions in Kalimantan on Malaysian products as much as 20%. On Natuna Regency, price of clothes decreased as much as 45% and price of salt on North Halmahera Regency decreased 50% per kilogram. It is noted that majority of requested to isolated regions and smaller ports are basic goods such as cooking oil, rice, or sugar, in addition to steel for construction. At the same time, majority of return freights are fishery products, forest products, and copra.

Nationally, it is estimated on average the program decreased basic goods and grocery prices as much as 30%.

== Criticism ==
The program was criticized for several reasons. One of them is that the program did not help Indonesia's shipping industry. While the majority of ships were constructed in Indonesia, around 60-75% of ship components were still imported as of 2018. Local dockyards were also rarely utilized for reparation and maintenance, in addition of newly constructed ship only 10% utilizes local dockyards. In maintenance and repairing, 80% of repairing and maintenance requests were from state-operated ships showing a lack of business by private shipping companies.

According to Minister of Transportation, Budi Karya Sumadi, while the program reduced overall prices and logistical cost, Indonesia still has more expensive logistics compared to neighbouring regions such as Japan and China. World Bank data in 2018 revealed that transporting a container from Jakarta to Singapore, Hong Kong, Bangkok, and Shanghai cost between $100–200 while cost of transporting from Jakarta to Padang, Medan, Banjarmasin, and Makassar still costs more than $1,400.

Another criticism is that the number of ports utilized are still small. As of 2017, only 97 out of 570 operational ports were used by the program. Indonesia's Shipping Connectivity Index is rank 36 out of 178 countries. While improving, this is still far from neighbouring country such as Malaysia and Vietnam with respective ranks of 5 and 19.

Lack of return freight is also criticized. Local entrepreneurs and businesses from destination ports are not using the program to tap into the city market. In 2020, return freight size was only 34% of goods delivered. In response, the Ministry of Transportation formed a special team to address the issue and increase return freight. Indonesian economist Faisal Basri criticized the program for only benefiting traders and businesses that have control over ports.
