= Java Integrated Industrial and Port Estate =

Java Integrated Industrial and Ports Estate
- Special Economic Zone
- Wordmark

- Location in Indonesia Java Integrated Industrial and Ports Estate (Indonesia)
- Coordinates: 7.085696°S 112.606810°E
- Country: Indonesia
- Region: Java
- Province: East Java
- Regency: Gresik Regency

Area
  - Total: 2,961 ha (7,320 acres)
  - Industrial Estate: 1,761 ha (4,350 acres)
  - Port Estate: 400 ha (990 acres)
- Time zone: UTC+7 (WIB)
- Website: http://jiipe.com/

Java Integrated Industrial and Ports Estate (JIIPE) is an industrial area, integrated with deep sea port, residential estate and industrial area at Gresik, East Java, Indonesia. The project is located 24 km from Surabaya. It is a Public Private Partnership development, which is jointly developed by PT Usaha Era Pratama Nusantara, a subsidiary of PT AKR Corporindo Tbk, and PT Berlian Jasa Terminal Indonesia, a subsidiary of state owned company Pelindo III.

JIIPE is located strategically in the mouth of Madura Strait, the first integrated industrial city and port development project in Indonesia. President Joko Widodo laid the first stone for the industrial estate construction project in 2015 and officially inaugurated JIIPE in 2018.

== Facilities ==
JIIPE has total area of 2,933 hectares, of which 1,761 hectares industrial park, 400 hectares seaport and an 800 hectares residential estate, named as Grand Estate Marina (GEM) city. It is divided into areas of Port Estate, Heavy Industry, Medium Industry, Light Industry, Commercial, Ports and Residential Areas, which can accommodate about 183 industries.

It has facilities which include,

- 23-megawatt (MW) power plant
- Waste-water treatment plant
- Gas pipeline connected to the gas pipeline of state-owned gas distributor Perusahaan Gas Negara (PGN)
- Fiber optic telecommunication system and broadband internet
- Sea port: The volume of cargo handled at Gresik SEZ port, which started operation in 2015, was up to 2 million tons and is projected to increase to 6 million tons following the completion of the jetty extension project in June 2021.

== Connectivity ==
Other than its own sea port, JIIPE has direct access to toll roads from Gresik, Surabaya, Juanda International Airport, and Port of Tanjung Perak.
