= Port of Makassar =

Port in South Sulawesi, Indonesia

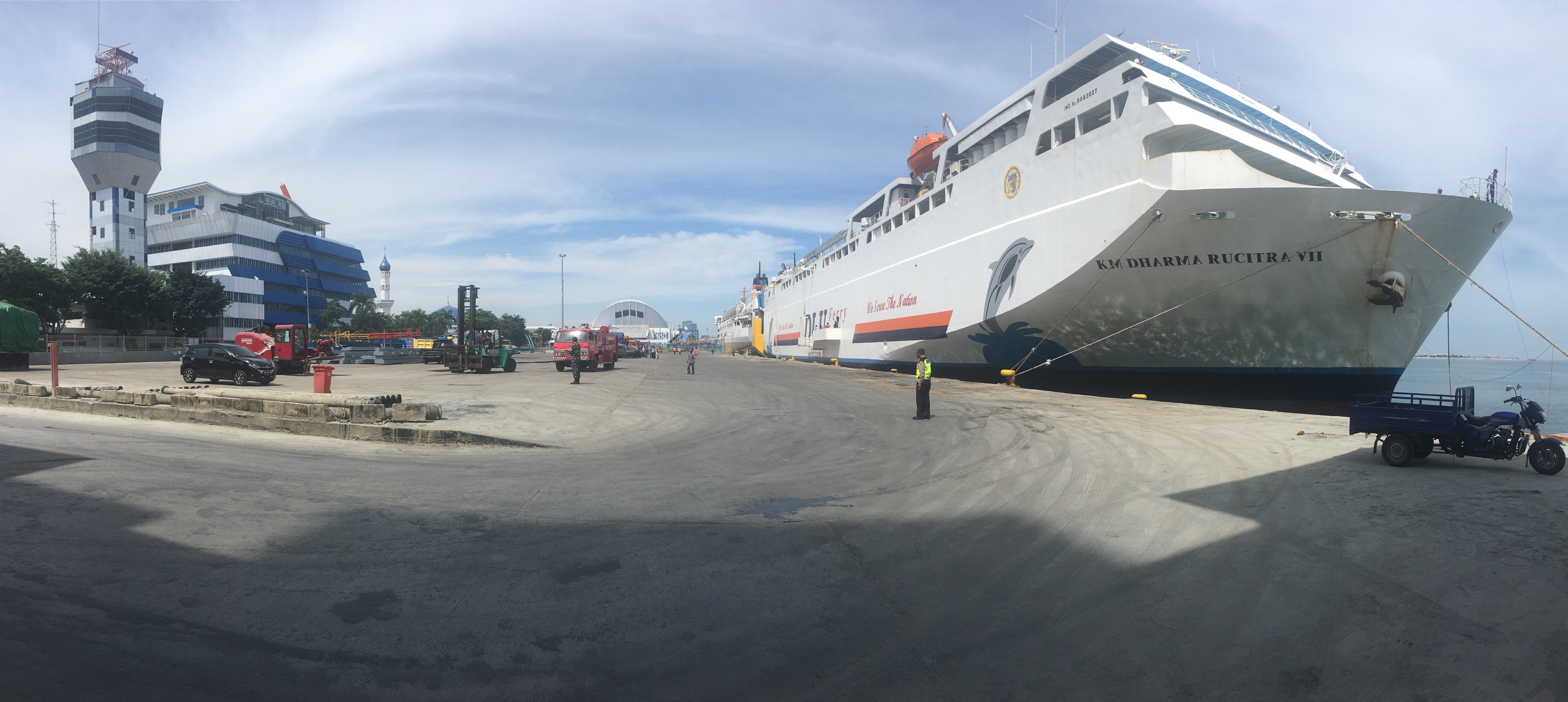
- Panoramic view of Soekarno—Hatta Port
- Interactive map of Port of Makassar

Location
- Country: Indonesia
- Location: Makassar, South Sulawesi
- Coordinates: 5.122°S 119.408°E
- UN/LOCODE: IDMAK

Details
- Owned by: PT Pelabuhan Indonesia IV
- No. of berths: 4

Statistics
- Annual cargo tonnage: 8,300,816 tonnes (2015)
- Annual container volume: 558,957 TEUs (2015)
- Passenger traffic: 841,942 (2015)

The Port of Makassar, also known as the Port of Soekarno-Hatta, is a seaport in Makassar, Indonesia. It is the largest cargo traffic hub in Sulawesi. It is considered a primary port (Pelabuhan Kelas Utama) by the Indonesian Government, along with the Port of Tanjung Priok (Jakarta), Port of Tanjung Perak (Surabaya), and Port of Belawan (Medan).

== Development ==
An expansion to the port, dubbed New Port Makassar, is under construction with an expected additional capacity of 1.5 million TEUs in its first phase. The Indonesian Ministry of Transportation has expressed a desire to designate the port as hub for the rest of Eastern Indonesia, in accordance to the Joko Widodo government's maritime axis program.

As of 2021, Makassar New Port construction has entered stages 1B and 1C with investments of Rp2.8 trillion, after stage 1A was finished and had been operating since early November 2018. Until the start of 2021, the progress of the Makassar New Port construction project has reached 63.75% in the last two years in 2019 and 2020. Makassar New Port construction is set to finish by the end of 2022.
