= Port of Bitung =

Seaport in North Sulawesi, Indonesia

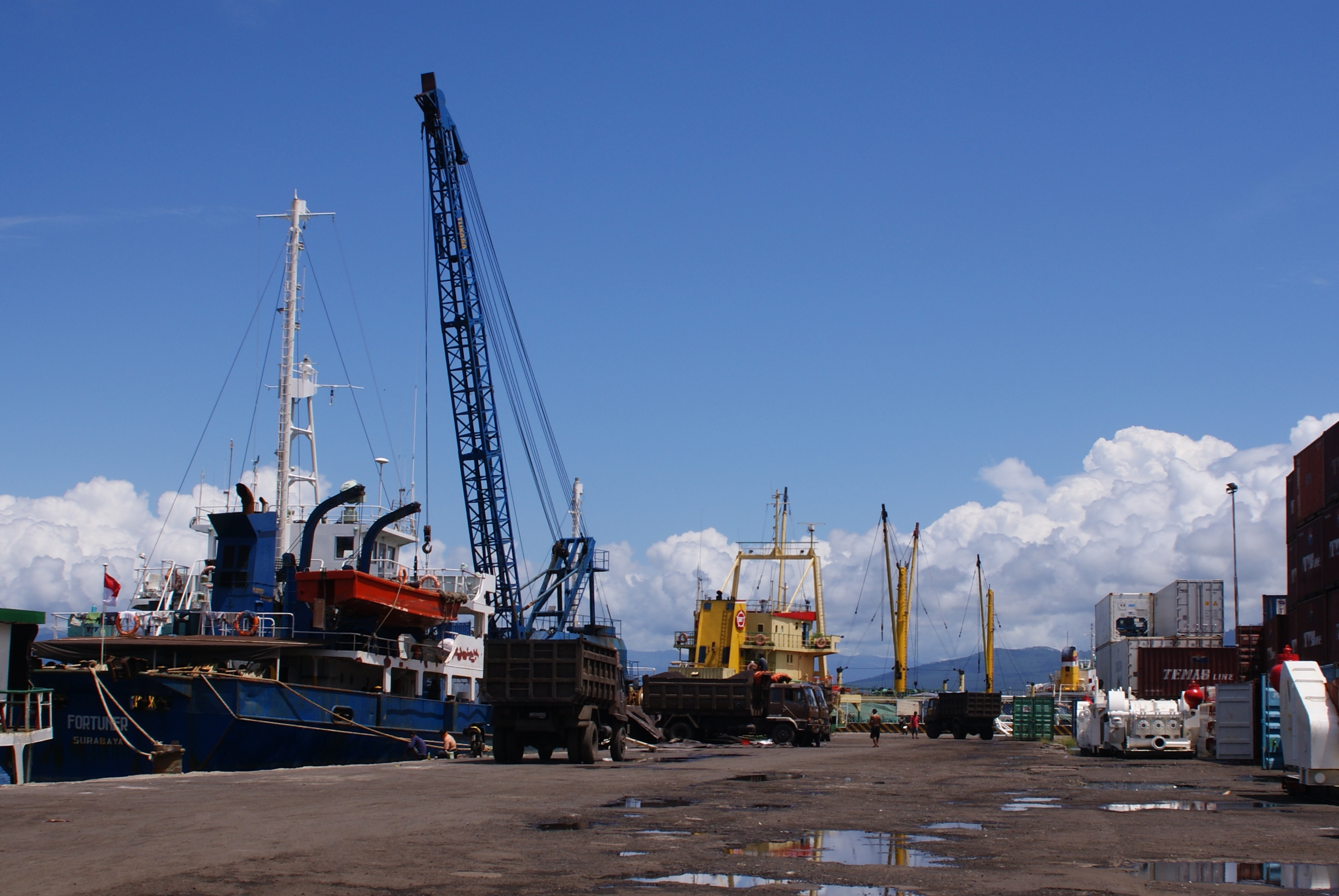
- Fortuner (IMO 7621114) berthed at the Port of Bitung, 2009

- Location in Indonesia
- Native name: Pelabuhan Bitung

Location
- Country: Indonesia
- Location: Jalan D.S Sumolang, Bitung, North Sulawesi, 95522
- Coordinates: 01°26′35″N 125°11′51″E
- UN/LOCODE: ID BIT

Details
- Operated by: PT Pelabuhan Indonesia IV
- Type of harbour: natural seaport
- No. of piers: 4

Statistics
- Vessel arrivals: daily
- Website www.inaport4.co.id/branch/read/1/22

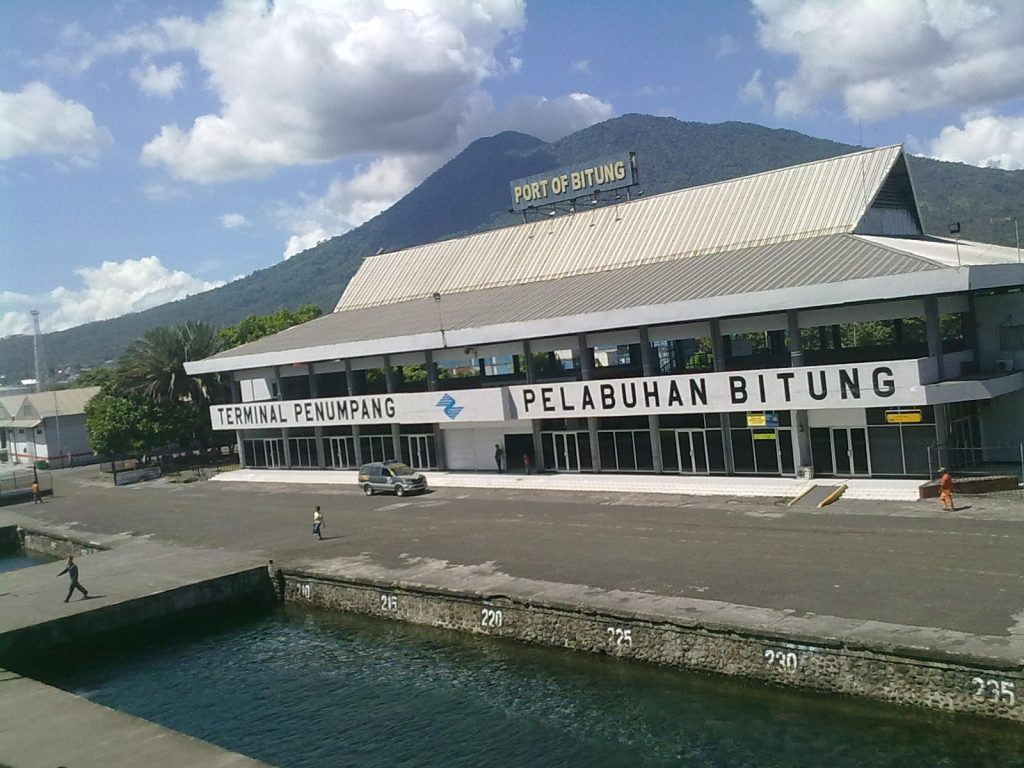
Port of Bitung terminal building

Port of Bitung (Indonesian: Pelabuhan Bitung) is a seaport located on Jalan D.S Sumolang in Bitung, North Sulawesi, in Indonesia. It is the largest port in the province, consists of both container and passenger ship ports. The port serves as a hub for most exports originated from North Sulawesi and other areas of eastern Indonesia to destinations such as Philippines and Vietnam. There are also ferry routes linking Bitung with General Santos and Davao City.

== Facilities ==
Since Bitung harbour's designation as an important international hub seaport in 2012, it has a larger sets of facilities than other ports in the area. The Port of Bitung is supported by two tugboats and four pilot boats and 9 miles (7.8 nautical miles; 14 kilometres) of 600 metres (2,000 feet) wide shipping lane. Currently Bitung harbour has four wharves:

- Ocean Wharf – 607 metres (1,991 feet) long with a depth of about 5 metres (16 feet).
- Nusantara Wharf – 652 metres (2,139 feet) long with a depth of about 6 metres (20 feet).
- Container Wharf VIII – 182 metres (597 feet) long with a depth of about 20 metres (66 feet).
- Container Wharf IX – 60 metres (200 feet) long with a depth of about 10 metres (33 feet).

In addition, there are other facilities that support the operation of the port, namely a container crane, a mobile crane, four chassis, five trucks, five forklifts, water desalination facility, refuelling stop (diesel and marine fuel), dry wharf for repairs, warehouse (3 x 4,320 square metres (46,500 square feet) and 1 x 432 square metres (4,650 square feet)), immigration, and a medical facility.
