= Port of Tanjung Perak =

Port in East Java, Indonesia

Port of Tanjung Perak Pelabuhan Tanjung Perak
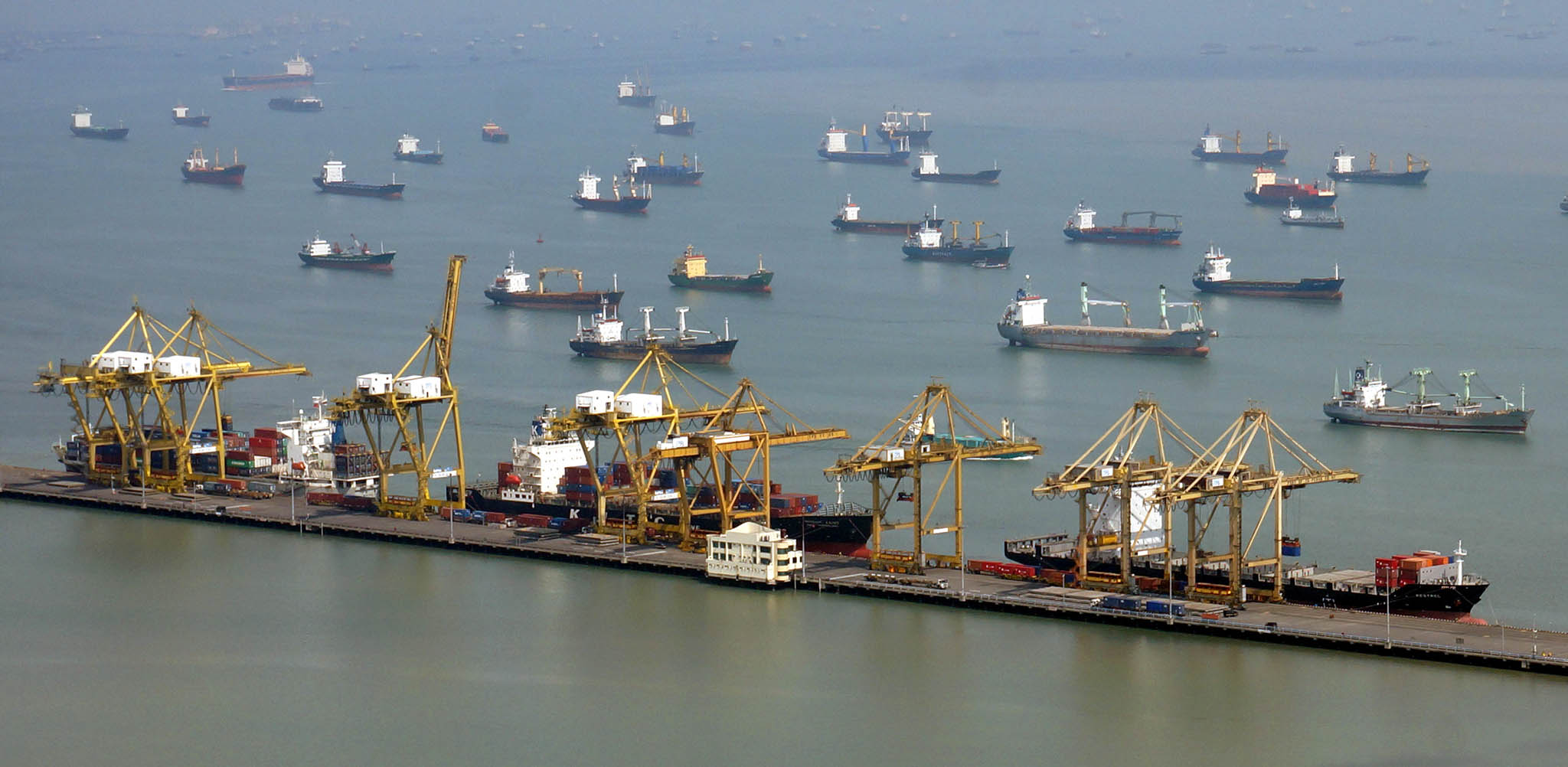
- Container terminal in Tanjung Perak
- Interactive map of Port of Tanjung Perak; Pelabuhan Tanjung Perak
- Location within Indonesia

Location
- Country: Indonesia
- Location: Surabaya
- Coordinates: 7°11′54″S 112°43′22″E

Details
- Opened: 1925
- Owned by: PT Pelabuhan Indonesia
- Type of Harbor: Natural
- Size of harbour: 1,029 hectares (2,540 acres)
- Land area: 545 hectares (1,350 acres)
- Size: 1,574 hectares (3,890 acres)
- Draft depth: 16 meters (52 feet)
- Street access: Surabaya–Porong Toll Road Surabaya–Gresik Toll Road
- Architect: Gerrit de Jongh

Statistics
- Annual cargo tonnage: 33,227,848 metric tons (2011)
- Annual container volume: 3.86 million TEUs (2018)
- Passenger traffic: 9,044,499 (2011)
- Net income: Rp2.01 trillion (CY 2017)
- Website pelindo.co.id

Port of Tanjung Perak (Indonesian: Pelabuhan Tanjung Perak) is the second busiest sea port in Indonesia, located at Surabaya, East Java. It is the main port for the eastern part of the island of Java. The port is accessed from the north through the Madura Strait, a 25-mile (40-kilometer) long, 100-meter (110-yard) wide, and 9.5-meter (31-foot) deep channel between East Java and Madura Island. Because of its strategic position and the existence of surrounding advantageous hinterlands, the port constitutes the center of inter island shipping for Eastern Indonesia. Container terminal of the port is known as Terminal Petikemas. The port loaded and unloaded 3.55 million and 3.8 million TEUs of cargo during 2017 and 2018 respectively.

In 2020, Tanjung Perak ranked 45th in the world by Lloyd's One Hundred Ports 2020, down from 43rd in 2019.

== History ==
Before the 20th century, oceangoing vessels from Surabaya did loading and unloading activities at Madura Strait and then freighted the cargoes by the means of barges and boats to Jembatan Merah (the first port in that time) situated along Kalimas River. Due to the increases of trade, cargo and transportation traffics, the facilities available at that port were inadequate.

In 1875, Ir. W. de Jonght planned to build the Port of Tanjung Perak, but the plan was not realized due to a lack of funds. At the start of 20th century Ir. W.B. Van Goor submitted another proposal for the port. Physical construction of the port started in 1910, dredging in January 1912. Droogdok Maatschappij Soerabaja (DMS), later known as PT. Dok & Perkapalan Surabaya (DPS), was established. From 1917 it operated Surabaya Dock of 3,500 tons, later followed by two others. DMS would also build a substantial number of ships.

After the completion of the Tanjung Perak Port, the ports of Kalimas and Jembatan Merah were gradually abandoned. An inter-island terminal and a passenger ferry terminal were built in the port in 1983. The Petikemas International Container Terminal was finished in 1992.

The port was dredged to a 14-meter (46-foot) depth to serve 10,000 TEUs 5th generation ships in mid-2015. In mid-2016 the port was dredged to a 16-meter (52-foot) depth with a width of 200-meter (220-yard) that can serve 15,000 TEUs or 7th generation ships.

== Facilities ==
The port has six main terminals, multi-purpose terminals for conventional cargo handling, a passenger terminal, RoRo and an international container terminal. Tugging, pilot, bunker, storage and shipyard services are also provided. Since 2015, activities of the port are supported by the Teluk Lamong Port Terminal. Tanjung Perak Port is also equipped with dock facilities that can serve cruises both from domestic and abroad.

In May 2014, a new Teluk Lamong Green Sea Port began trial run operation with two Ship to Shore Crane units, five Automated Stacking Crane units, and one Automotive Terminal Tractor unit as an extension of the Tanjung Perak port. The new facilities will primarily serve international shipping, predicted to be 7 ships every week, and any unused capacity will be used to support domestic shipping. The new facilities will use less paper and gas trucks to carry containers in the port area. From January 2015, a dry bulk port will be built with piers to accommodate up to 14 Logistex Warehouse System international ships. The port will be provided with 2 "Ship Unloader" units complete with conveyors and 8 hectares (20 acres) of warehousing. The dry bulk terminal will occupy 26 hectares (64 acres), a supporting area of 36 hectares (89 acres) for a total capacity of 20,000,000 metric tons (22,000,000 short tons).

=== Gapura Surya Nusantara ===
The new passenger terminal of the port is known as Gapura Surya Nusantara, which was opened in 2014. The terminal is built with modern amnesties and facilities, similar to an airport terminal including passenger bridge, ticket counter, waiting lounge and food court. The terminal is built with the concept of green architecture, environmentally friendly and energy saving technology. The sewage treatment plant (STP) of the terminal can recycle waste water which can be used for flushing toilets. The terminal consists of 3 floors covering an area of 16,120-square-meter (19,280-square-yard) with a capacity of 4,000 passengers. The terminal operates regular ship service to various ports of Indonesia, which is also serves as terminal for international cruise ships.

== Gallery ==
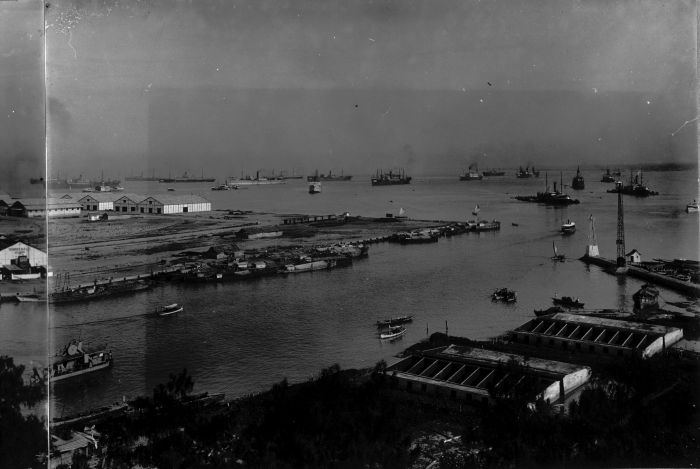
Tanjung Perak circa 1920s

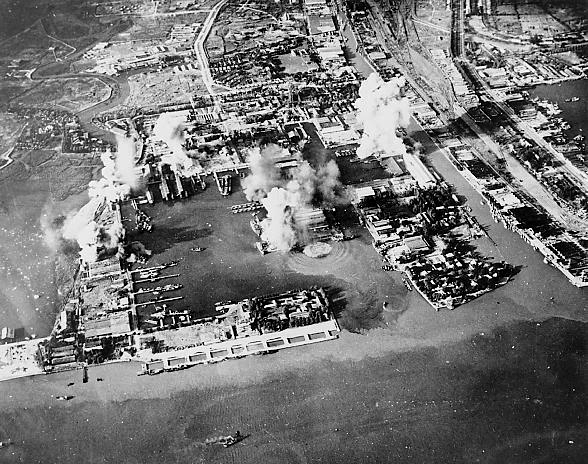
Operation Transom, destroyed Tanjung Perak, 17 May 1944

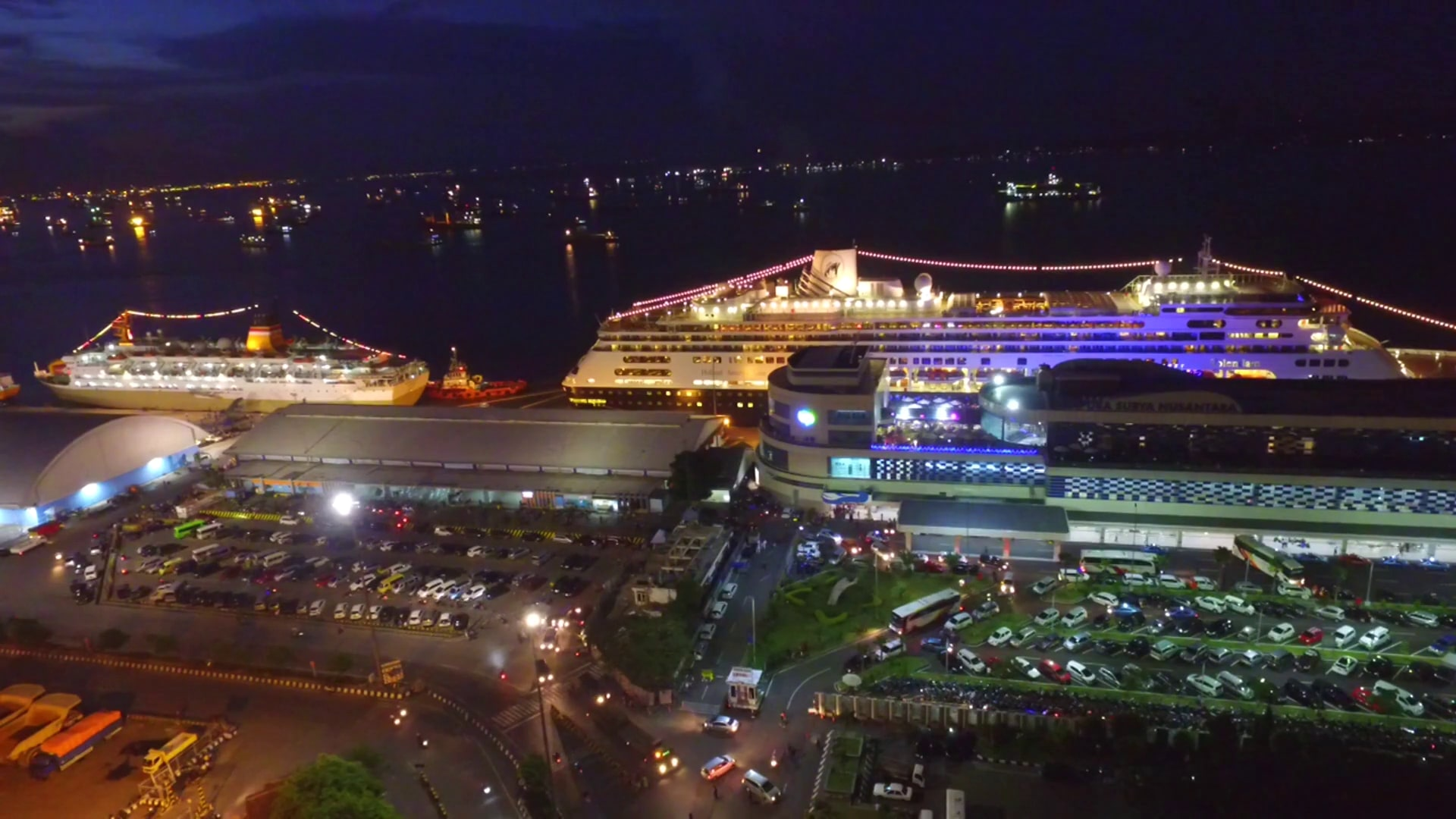

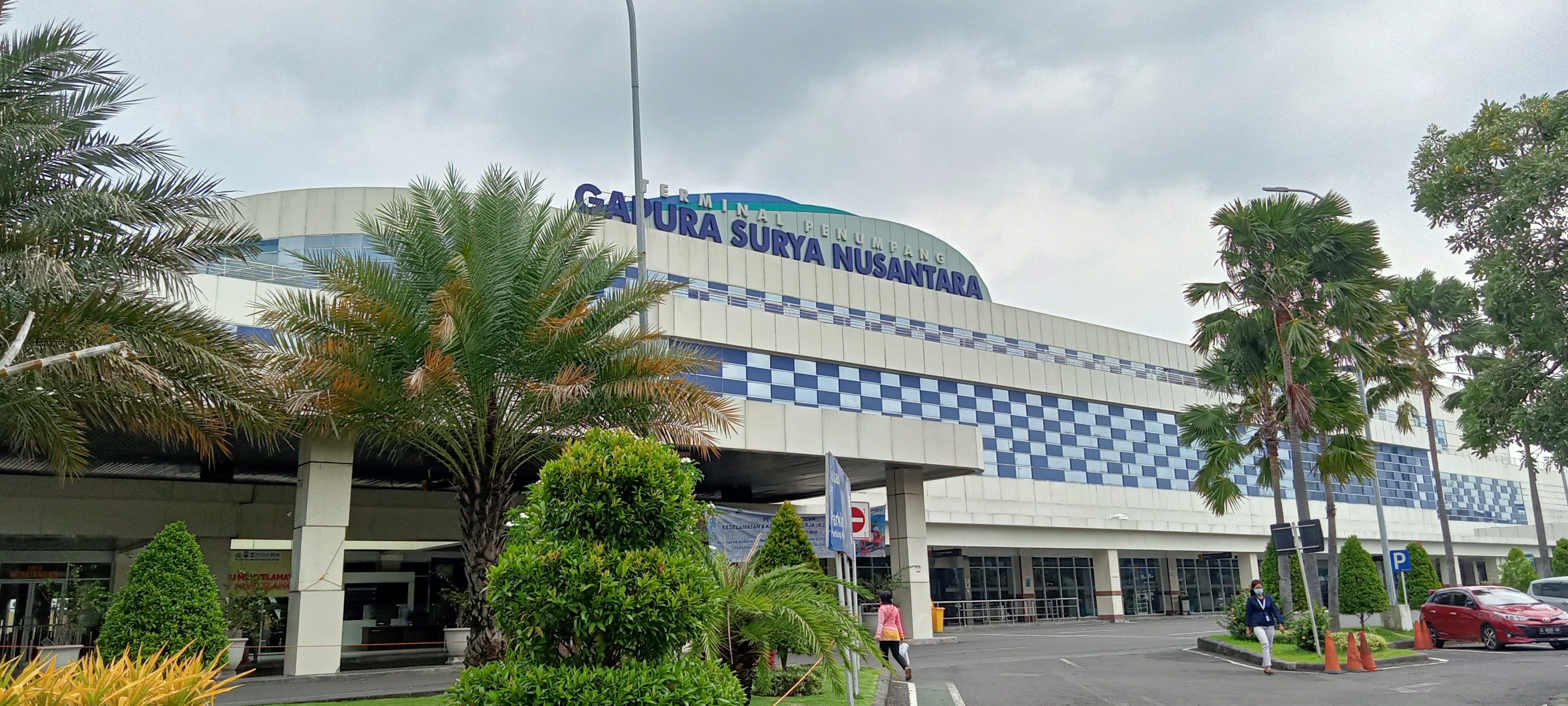

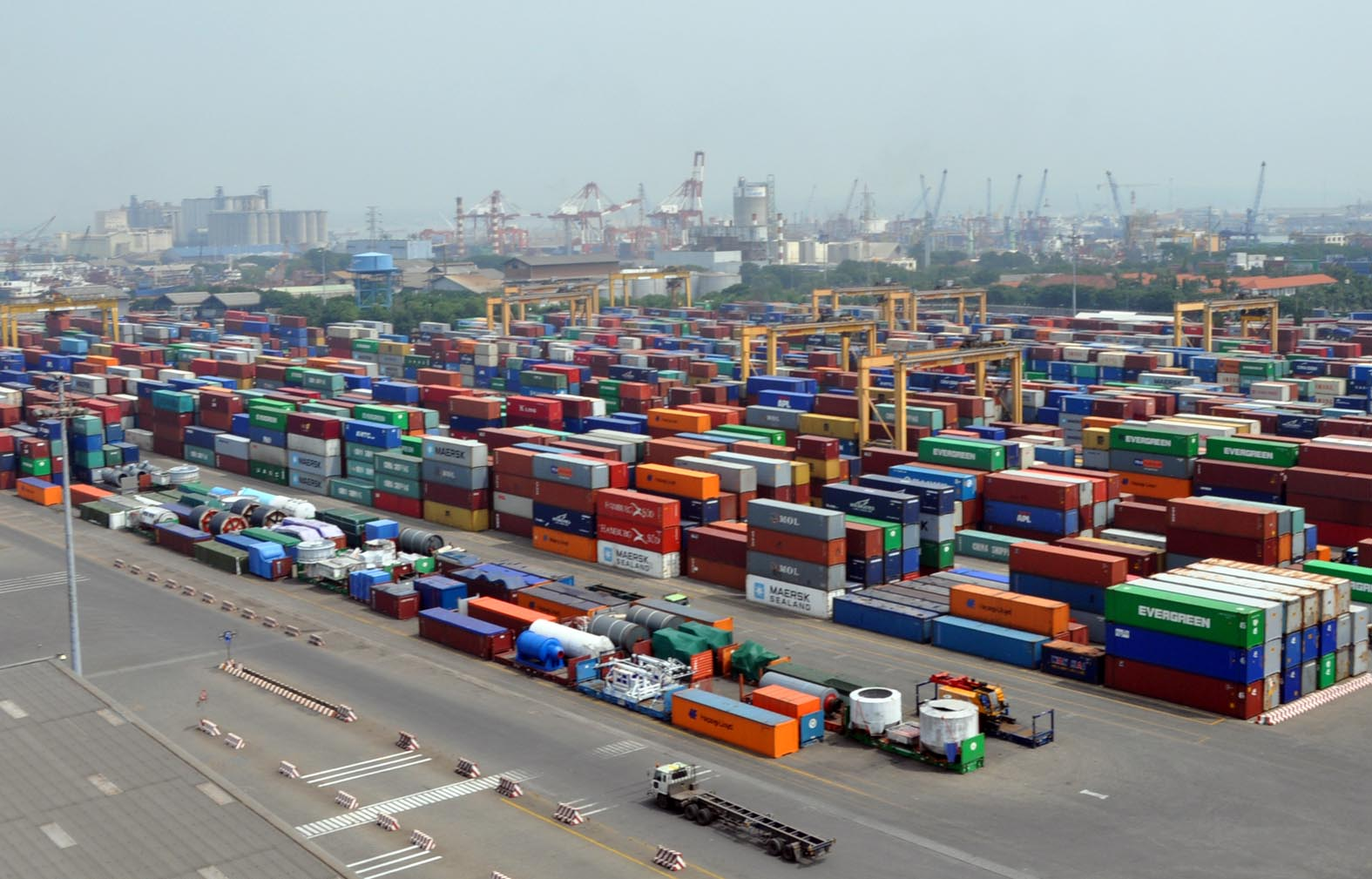

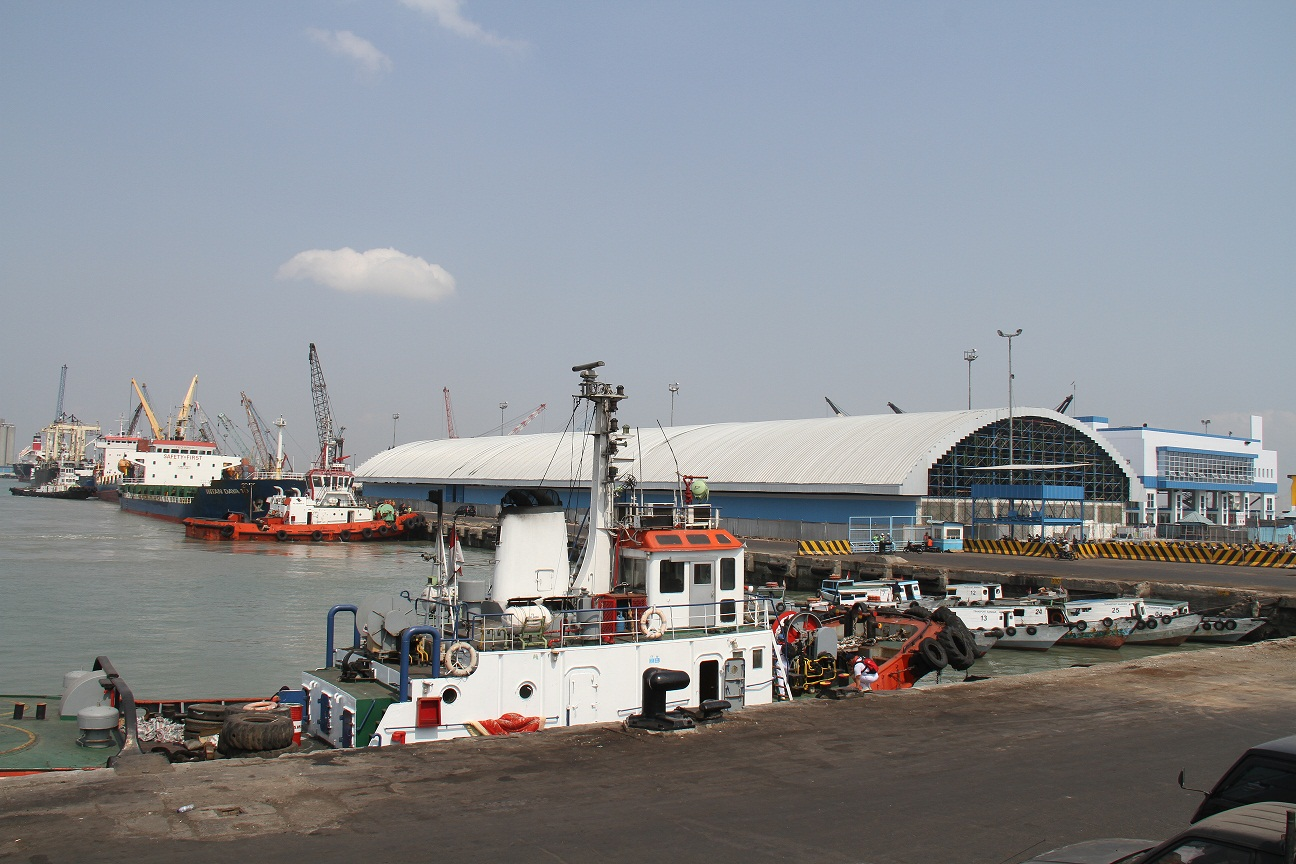

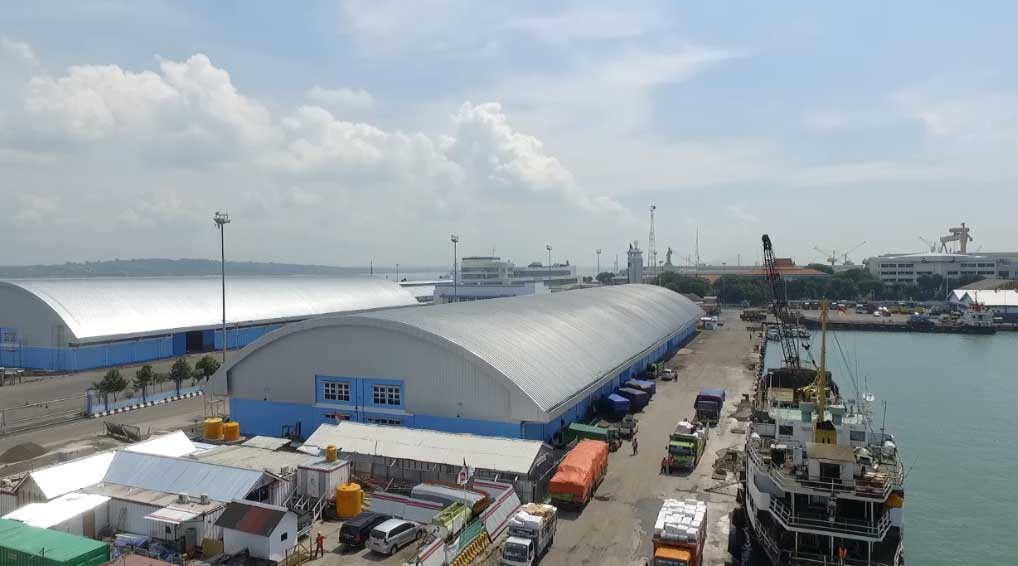

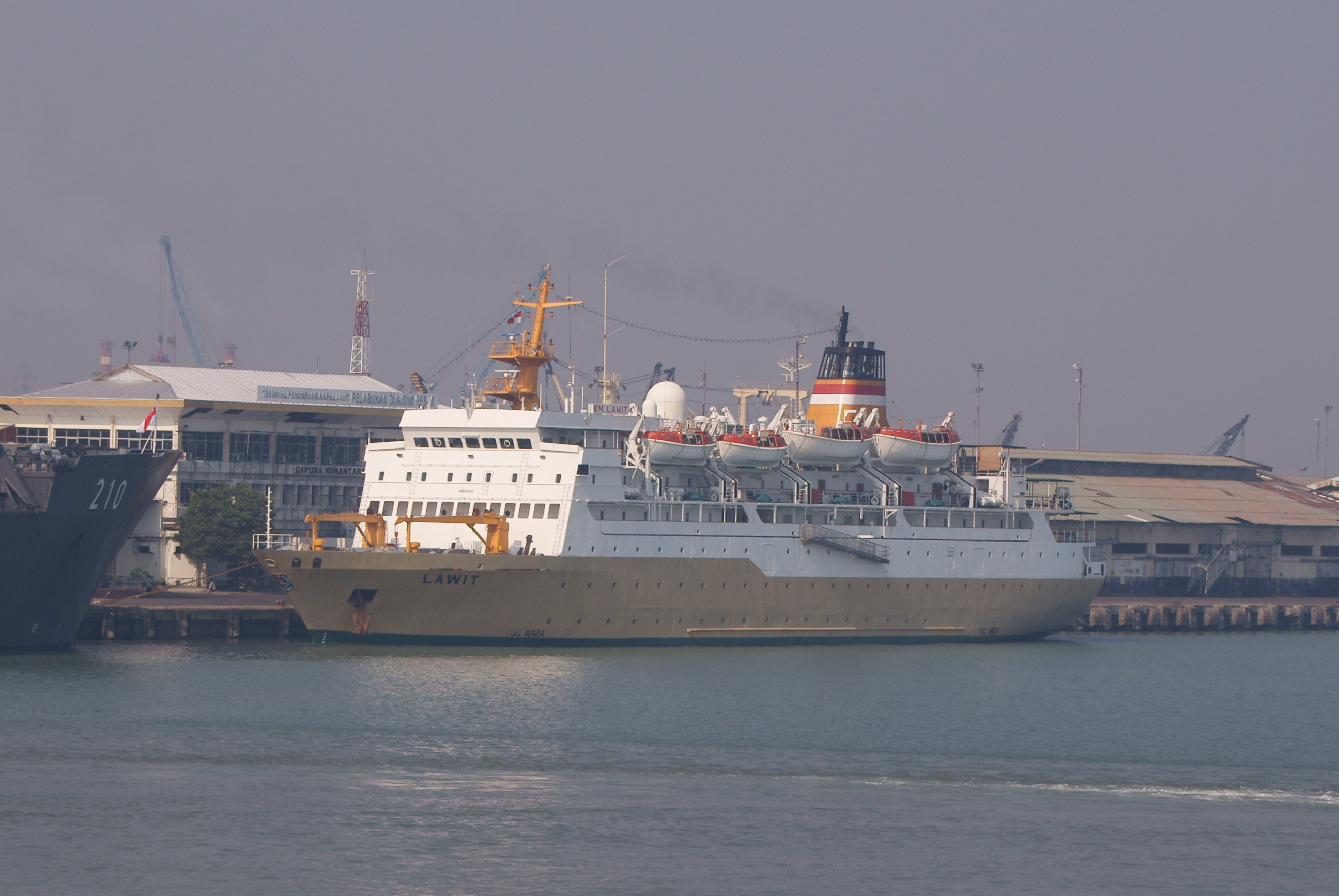

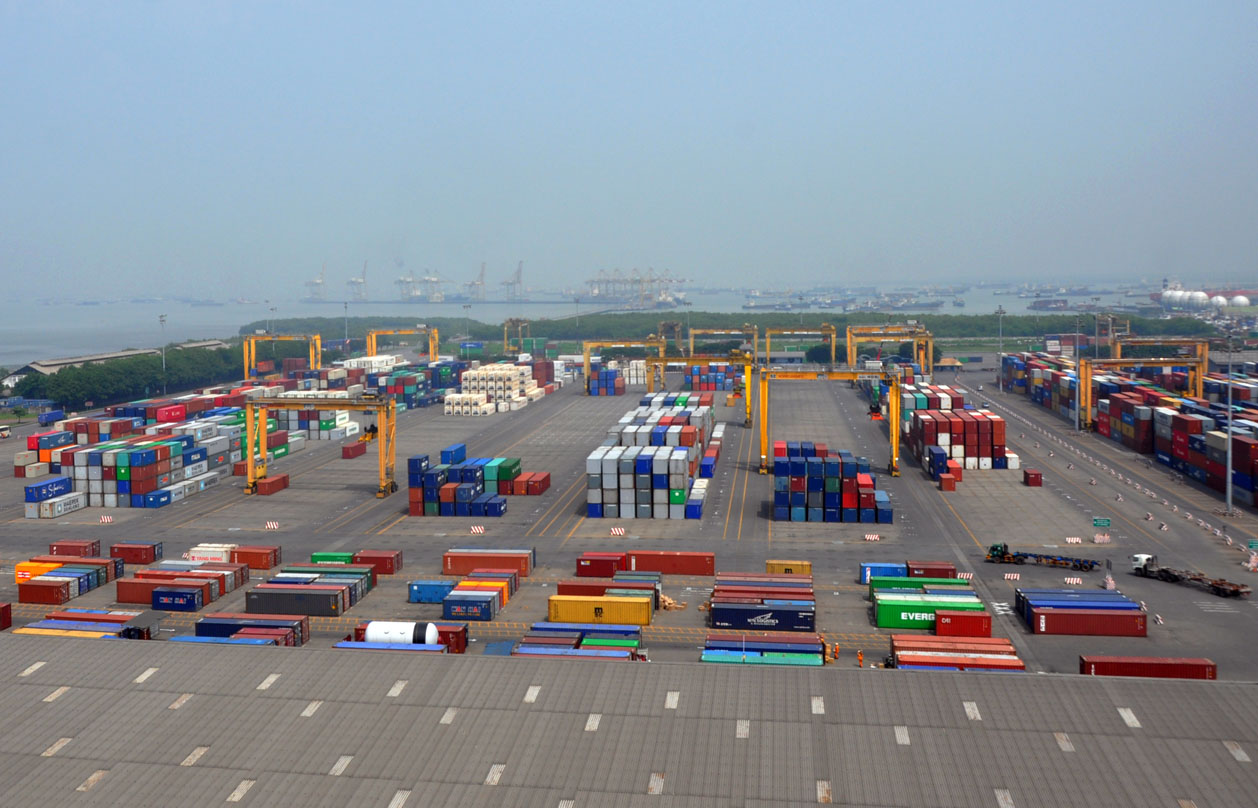

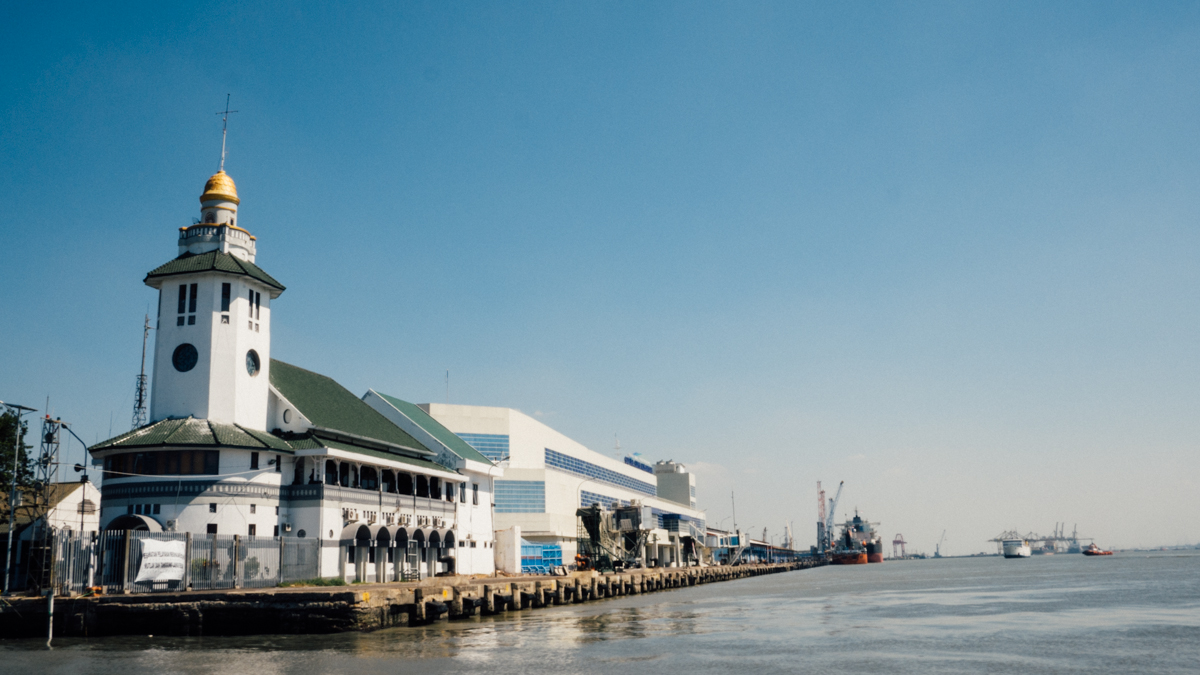

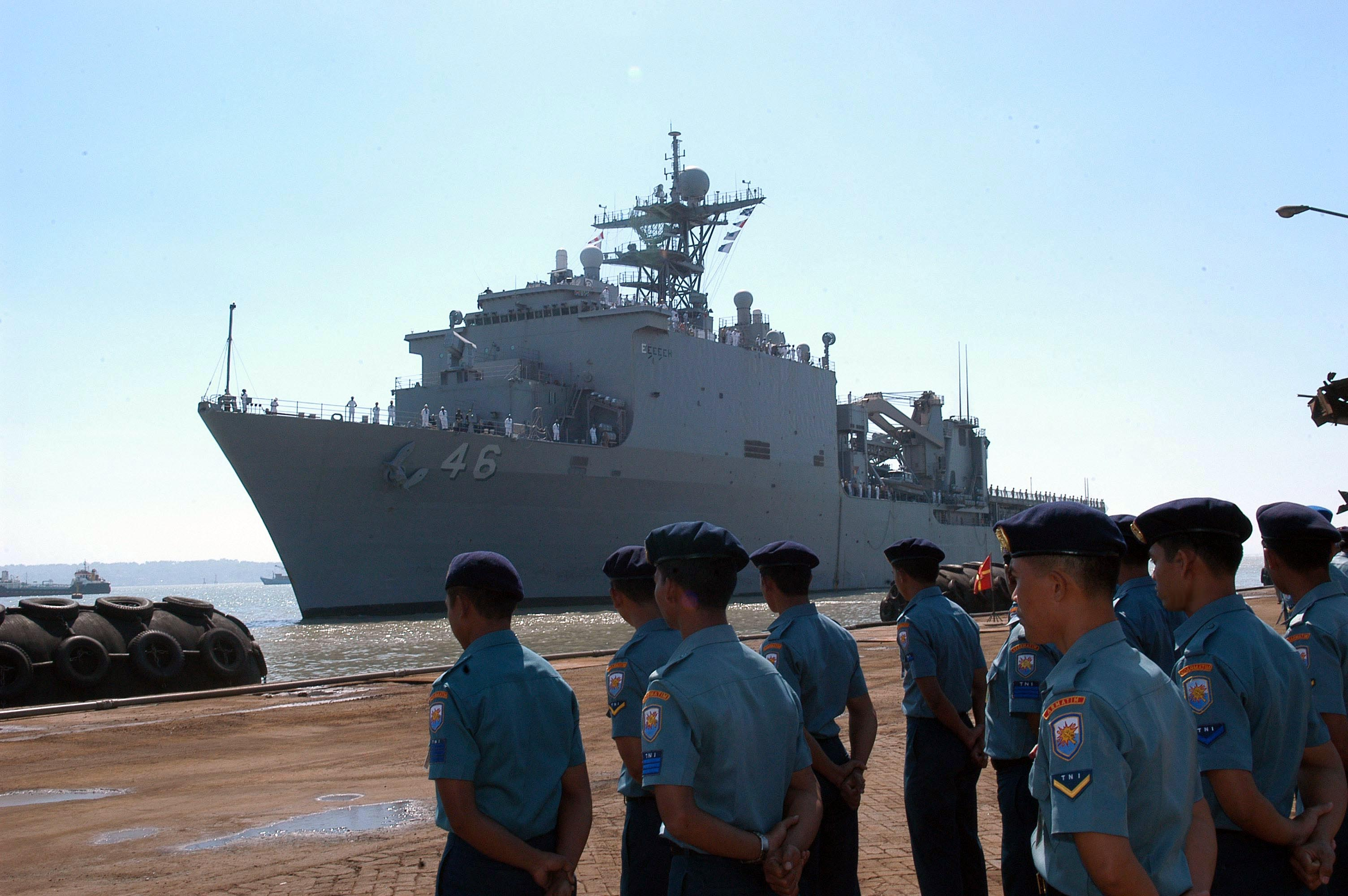

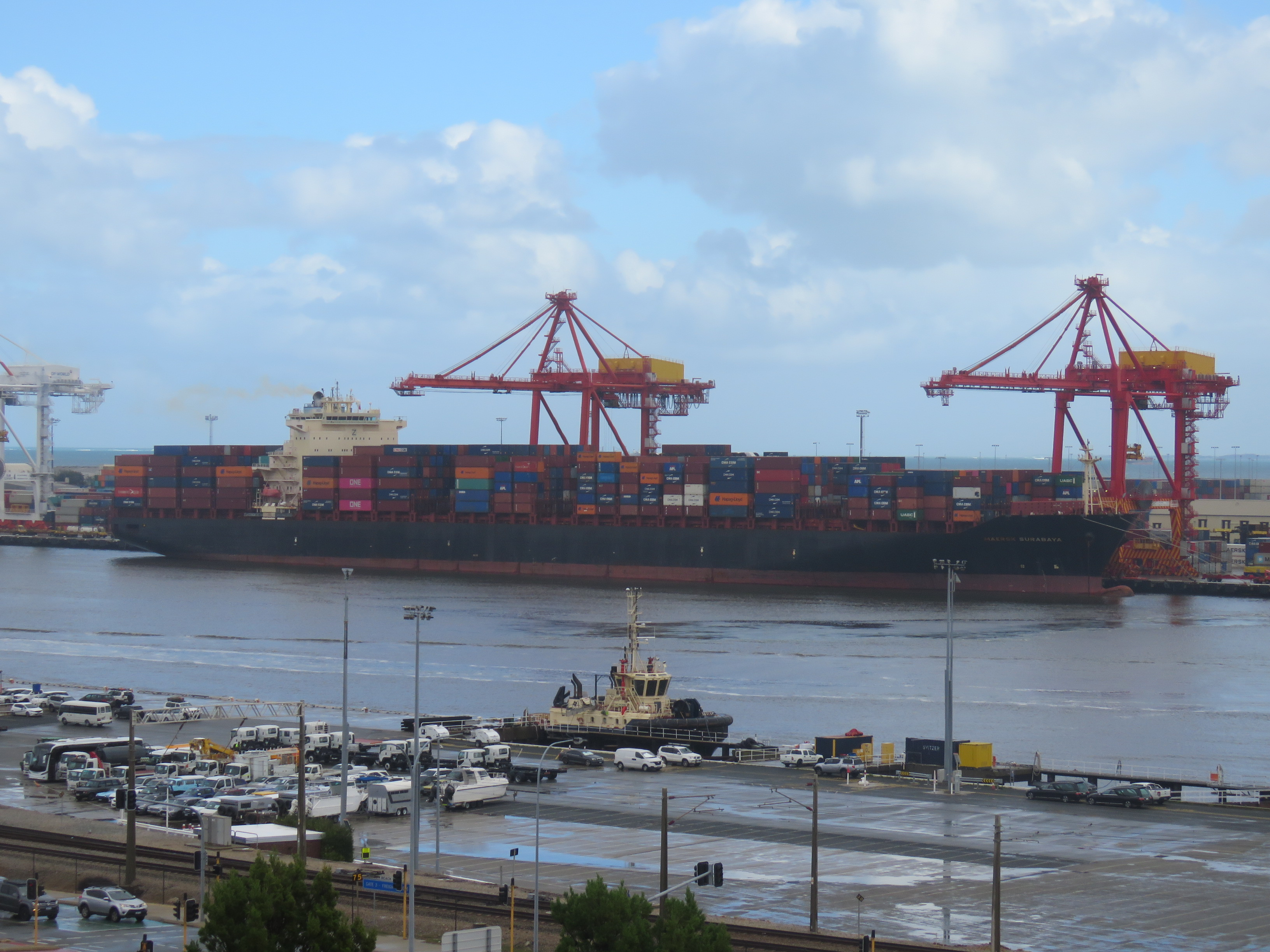

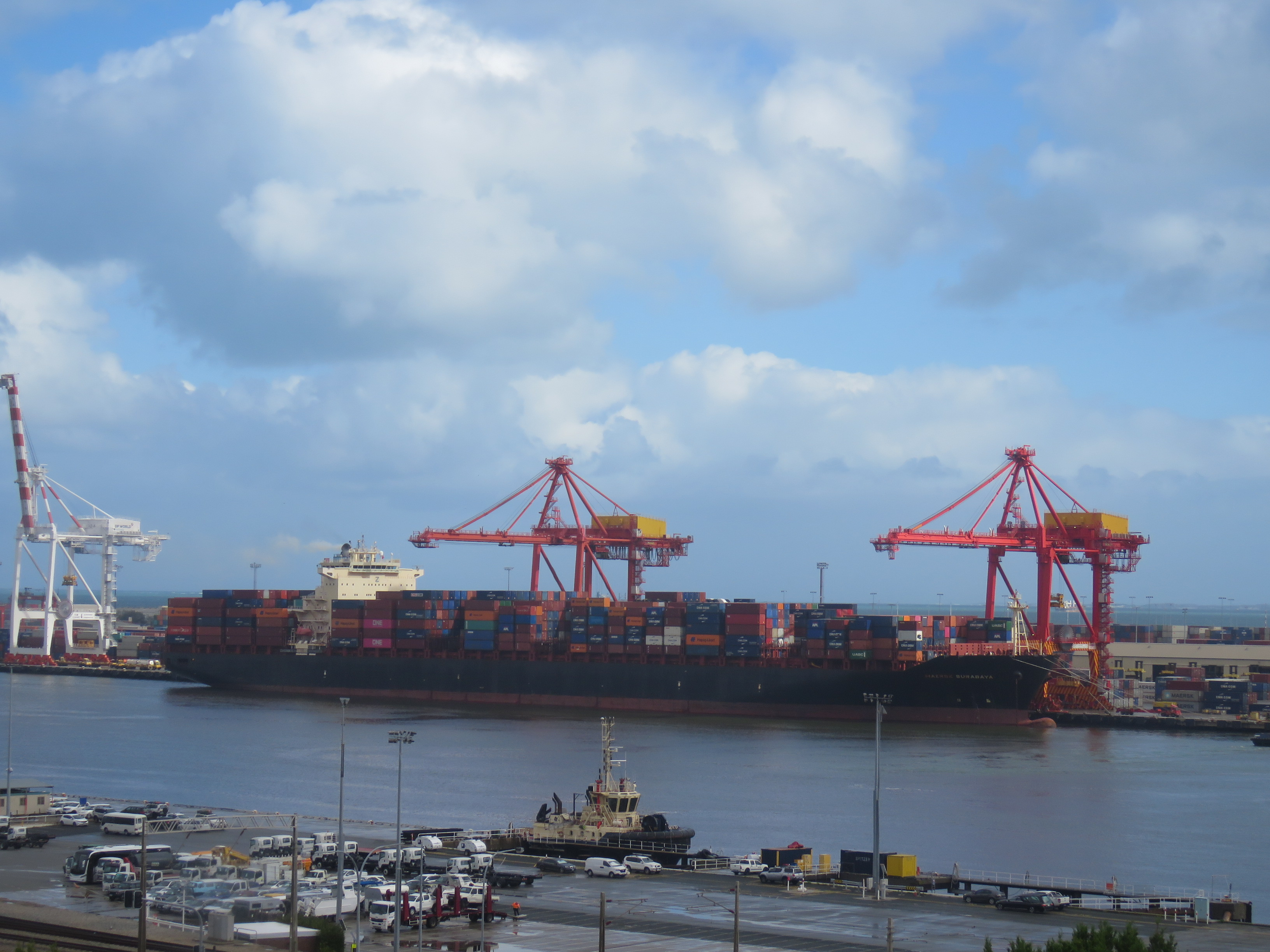

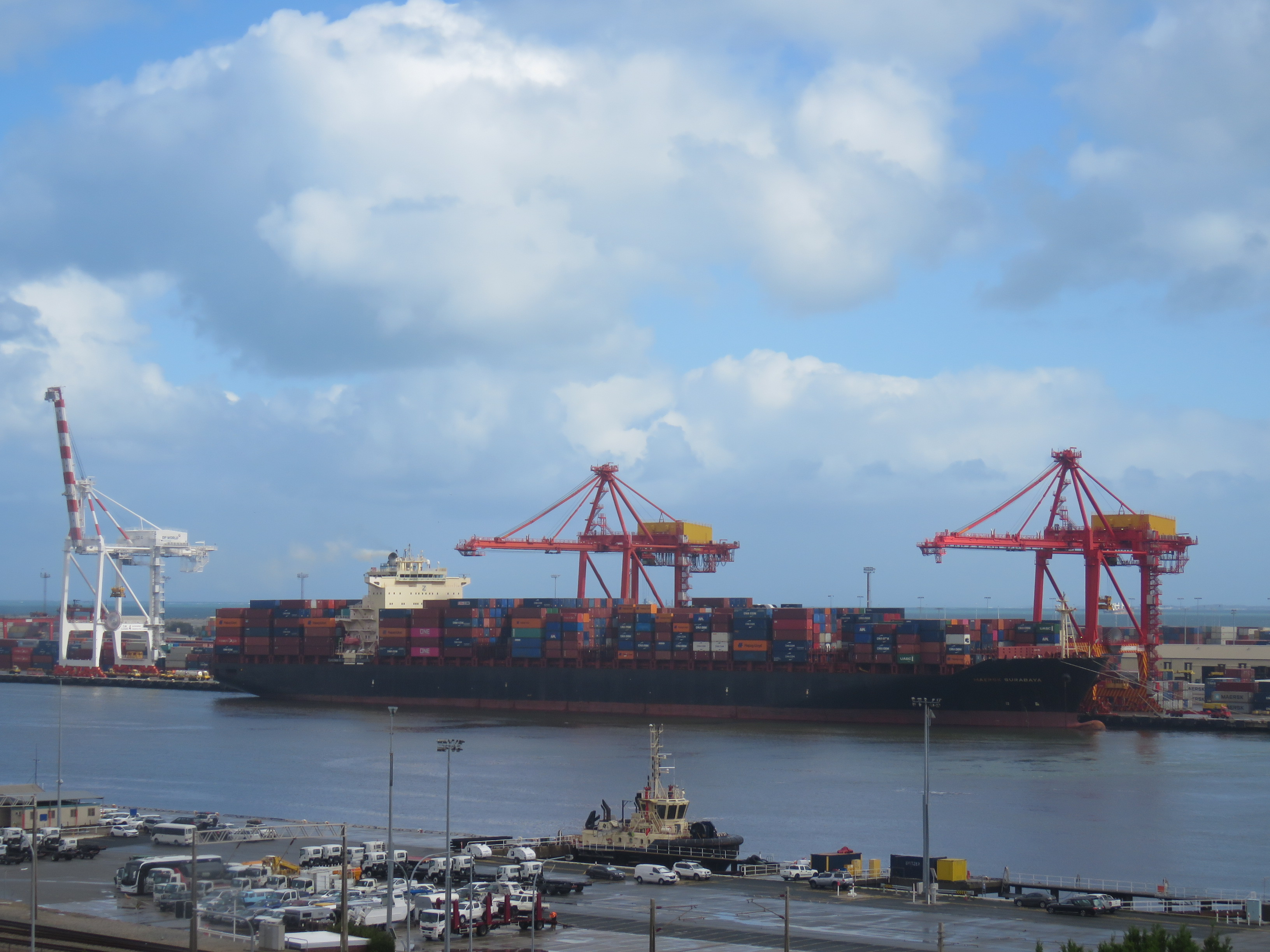

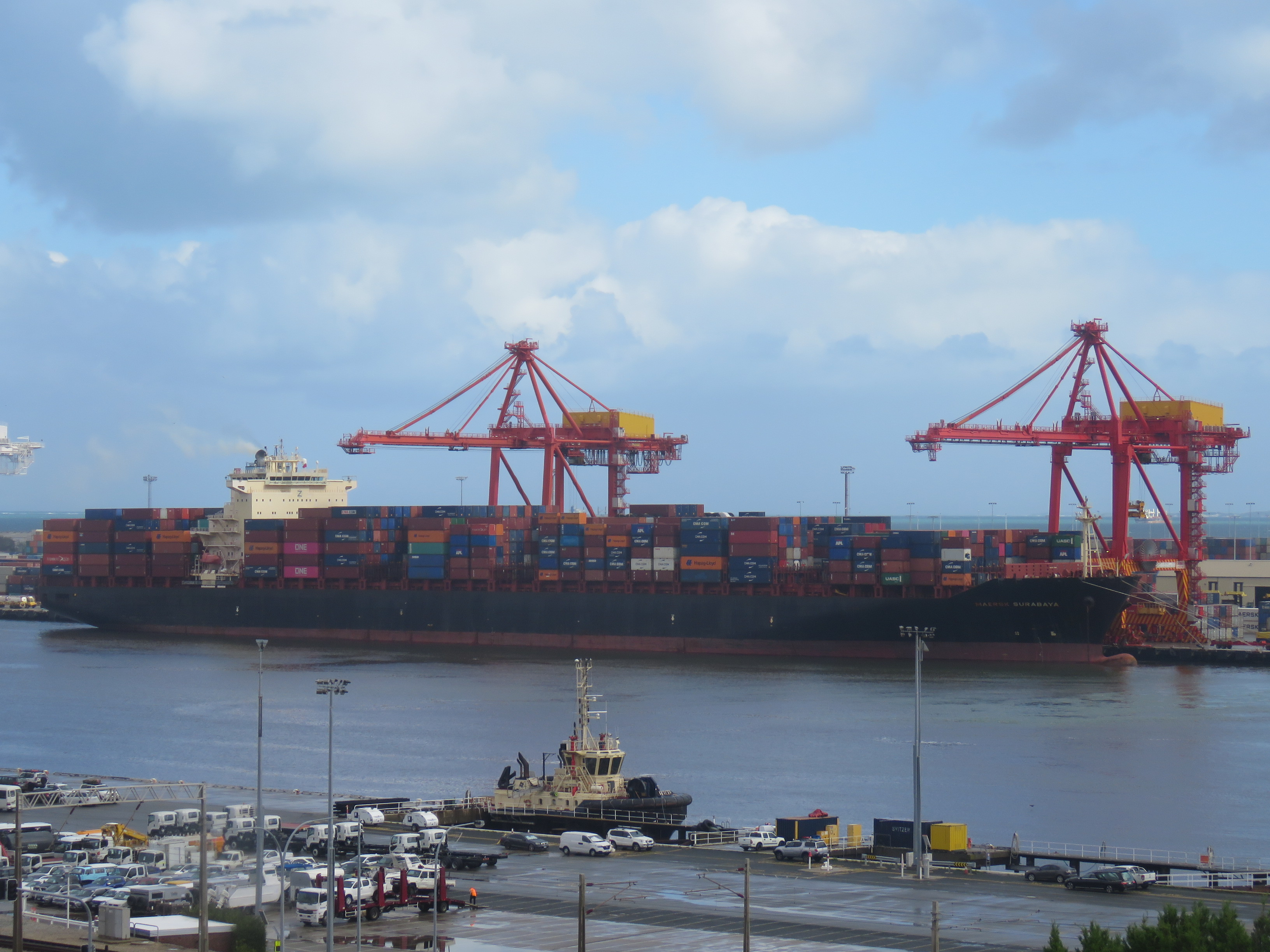

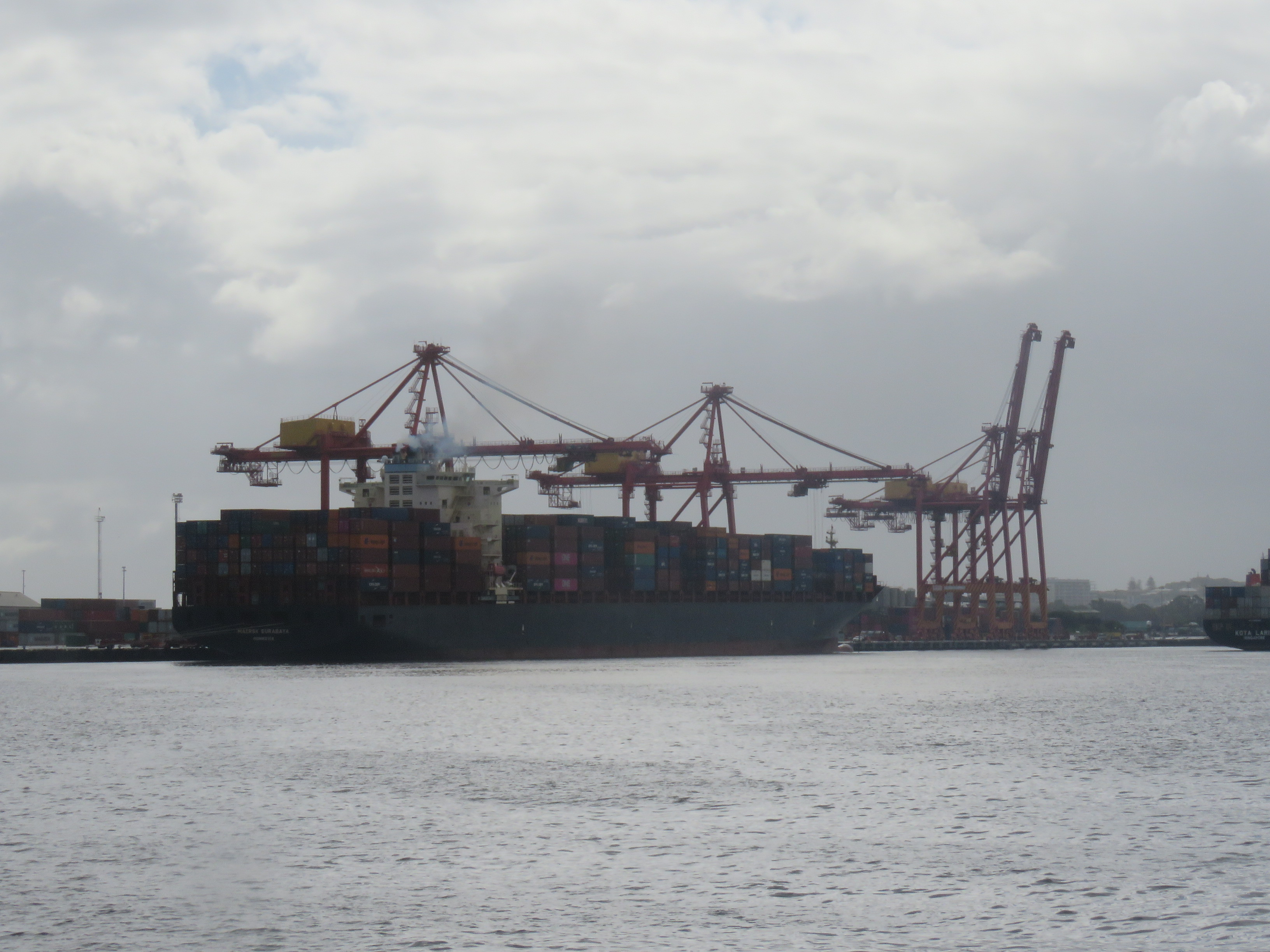

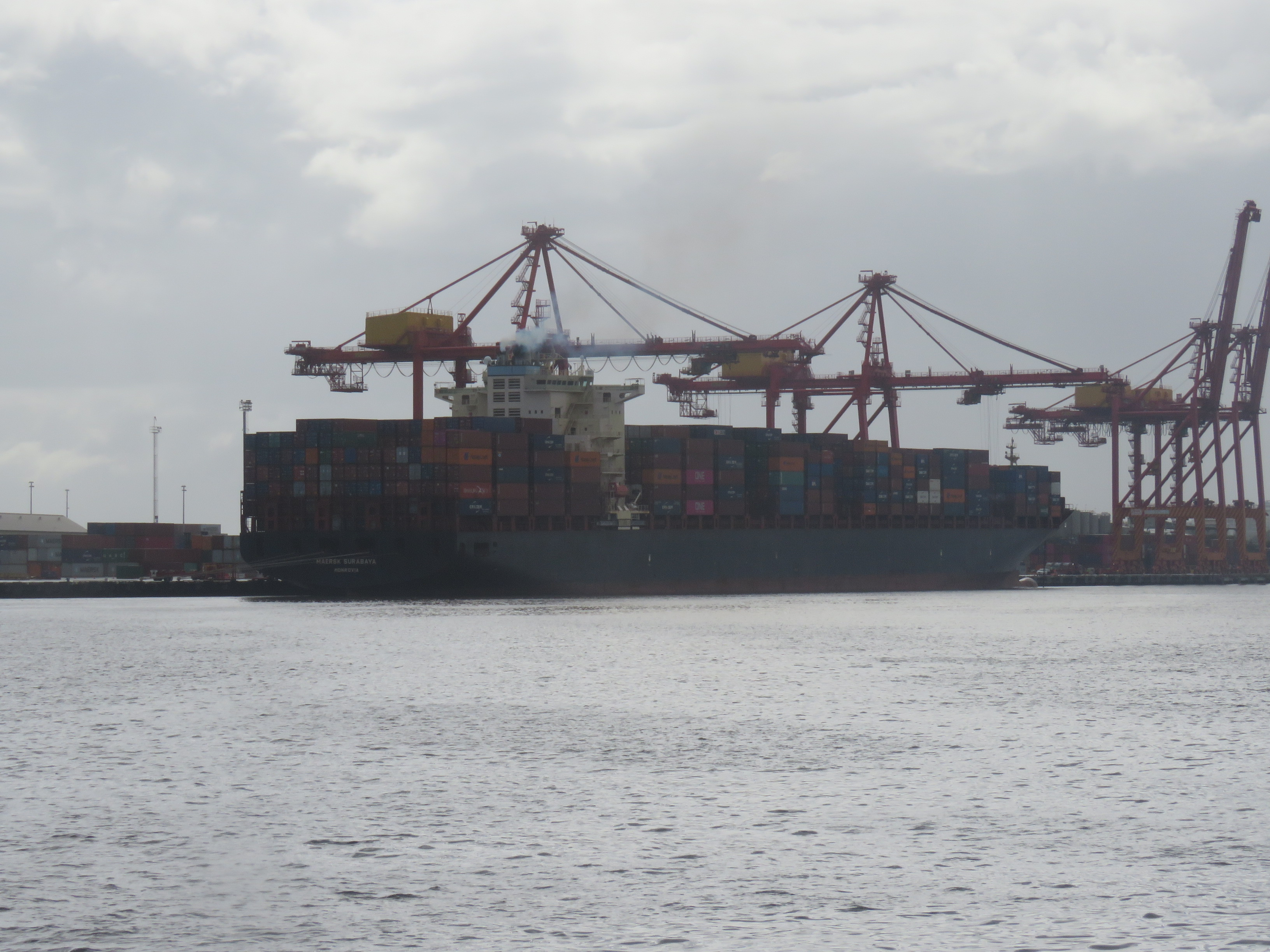

== Panorama ==
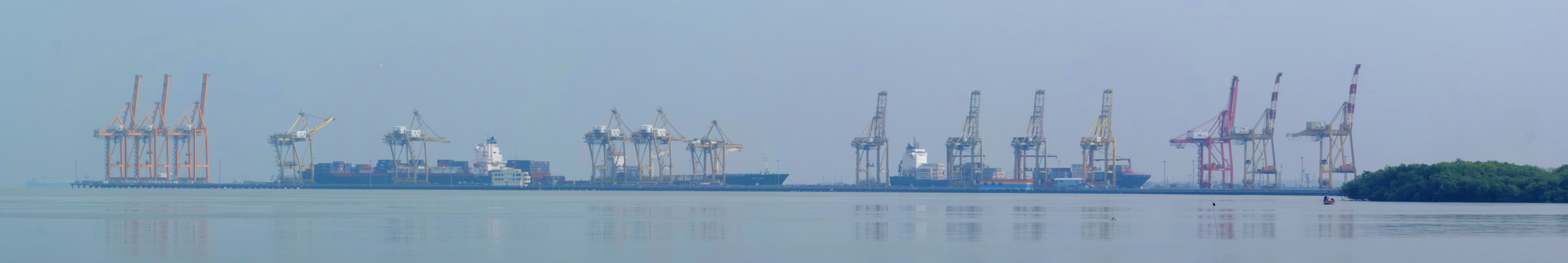
Panorama of Western Tanjung Perak Harbor

== See also ==
- Java Integrated Industrial and Port Estate
- List of Indonesian ports
- Ministry of Transportation, Indonesia
- Transport in Indonesia
