= List of ports in Indonesia =

This is a list of ports in Indonesia, sorted by location.

== Java ==
- Port of Cirebon, Cirebon, West Java
- Port of Merak, Cilegon, Banten
- Port of Tanjung Priok, Jakarta
- Sunda Kelapa, Jakarta
- Cikarang Dry Port, Cikarang, Bekasi Regency, West Java
- Port of Patimban, Subang Regency, West Java
- Port of Pramuka, Garut Regency, West Java
- Port of Tanjung Perak, Surabaya, East Java
- Port of Tanjung Emas, Semarang, Central Java
- Port of Tanjung Intan, Cilacap Regency, Central Java
- Port of Ketapang, Banyuwangi Regency, East Java
- Kamal, Bangkalan Regency, East Java

== Sumatra ==
- Port of Kuala Tanjung, Batubara Regency, North Sumatra
- Port of Bakauheni, South Lampung Regency, Lampung
- Port of Belawan, Medan, North Sumatra
- Port of Tanjung Api-Api, Banyuasin Regency, South Sumatra
- Port of Teluk Bayur, Padang, West Sumatra
- Jambi, Jambi
- Bengkulu, Bengkulu
- Port of Tanjung Kalian, Muntok, West Bangka Regency, Bangka-Belitung
- Port of Pangkal Balam, Pangkal Pinang, Bangka-Belitung
- Dumai, Riau
- Port of Batu Ampar, Batam, Riau Islands
- Port of Krueng Geukueh, North Aceh Regency, Aceh

== Kalimantan ==
- Port of Trisakti, Banjarmasin, South Kalimantan
- Samarinda, East Kalimantan
- Tanjung Bara, East Kutai Regency, East Kalimantan
- Port of Semayang, Balikpapan, East Kalimantan
- Sampit, East Kotawaringin Regency, Central Kalimantan
- Panglima Utar Kumai, West Kotawaringin Regency, Central Kalimantan
- Pontianak, West Kalimantan
- Port of Tanjungpura, Mempawah Regency, West Kalimantan
- Tarakan, North Kalimantan

== Sulawesi ==
- Port of Makassar, Makassar, South Sulawesi
- Kendari, Southeast Sulawesi
- Kolonodale, North Morowali Regency, Central Sulawesi
- Gorontalo, Gorontalo
- Port of Bitung, Bitung, North Sulawesi

== Nusa Tenggara ==
- Port of Gilimanuk, Jembrana Regency, Bali
- Tanjung Benoa, Badung Regency, Bali
- Padangbai, Karangasem Regency, Bali
- Port of Lembar, West Lombok Regency, West Nusa Tenggara
- Waingapu, East Sumba Regency, East Nusa Tenggara

== Maluku & Papua ==
- Obi, South Halmahera Regency, North Maluku
- Port of Dobo, Aru Islands Regency, Maluku
- Port of Sorong, Sorong, West Papua
- Amamapare, Mimika Regency, Central Papua
- Port of Depapre, Jayapura Regency, Papua
- Port of Biak, Biak Numfor Regency, Papua

== See also ==
- Indonesia Port Corporations
- Transport in Indonesia
