= Pelni =

Indonesian maritime transport company

PT Pelayaran Nasional Indonesia (Persero)

- Pelni headquarters in Jakarta, 2016
- Type: State-Owned Enterprise
- Industry: Maritime transport
- Predecessor: Yayasan Penguasaan Pusat Kapal-Kapal (PEPUSKA)
- Founded: 28 April 1952; 74 years ago
- Headquarters: Central Jakarta, Indonesia
- Number of locations: 48 branch and sub-branch offices (2017)
- Area served: Indonesia
- Key people: Tri Andayani, President Director; Ali Masykur Musa, President Commissioner
- Revenue: ▲IDR 4.59 Trillion (2018)
- Operating income: ▼IDR 75.1 Billion (2018)
- Net income: ▼IDR 204.2 Billion (2018)
- Total assets: ▲IDR 6.56 Trillion (2018)
- Total equity: ▲IDR 5.89 Trillion (2018)
- Owner: Government of Indonesia
- Number of employees: 4,379 (2018)
- Subsidiaries: PT Sarana Bandar Nusantara; PT Pelita Indonesia Djaya Corporation; Rumah Sakit PELNI
- Website: www.pelni.co.id

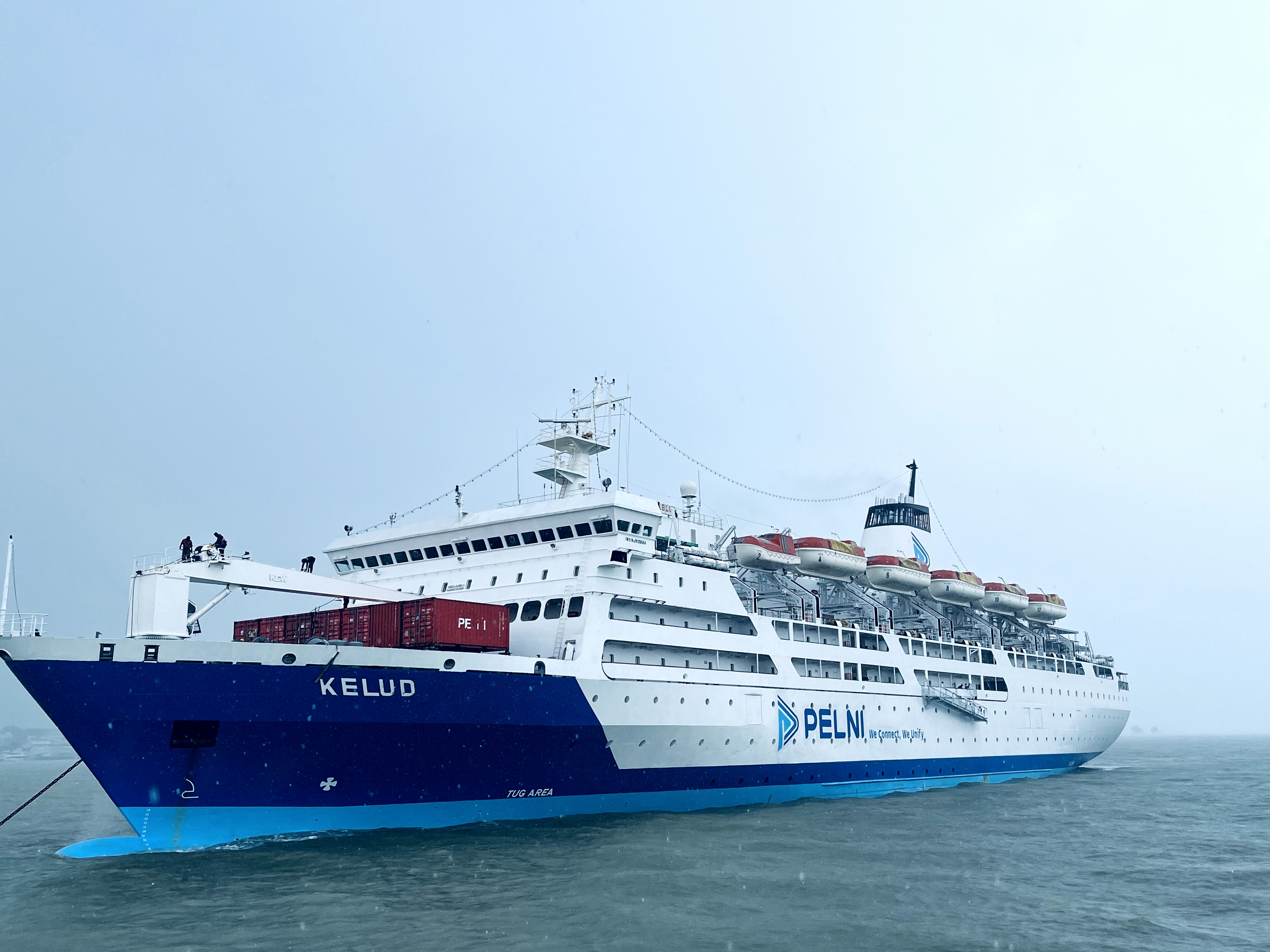
Pelni ship KM Kelud with new livery after the rebranding in 2023.

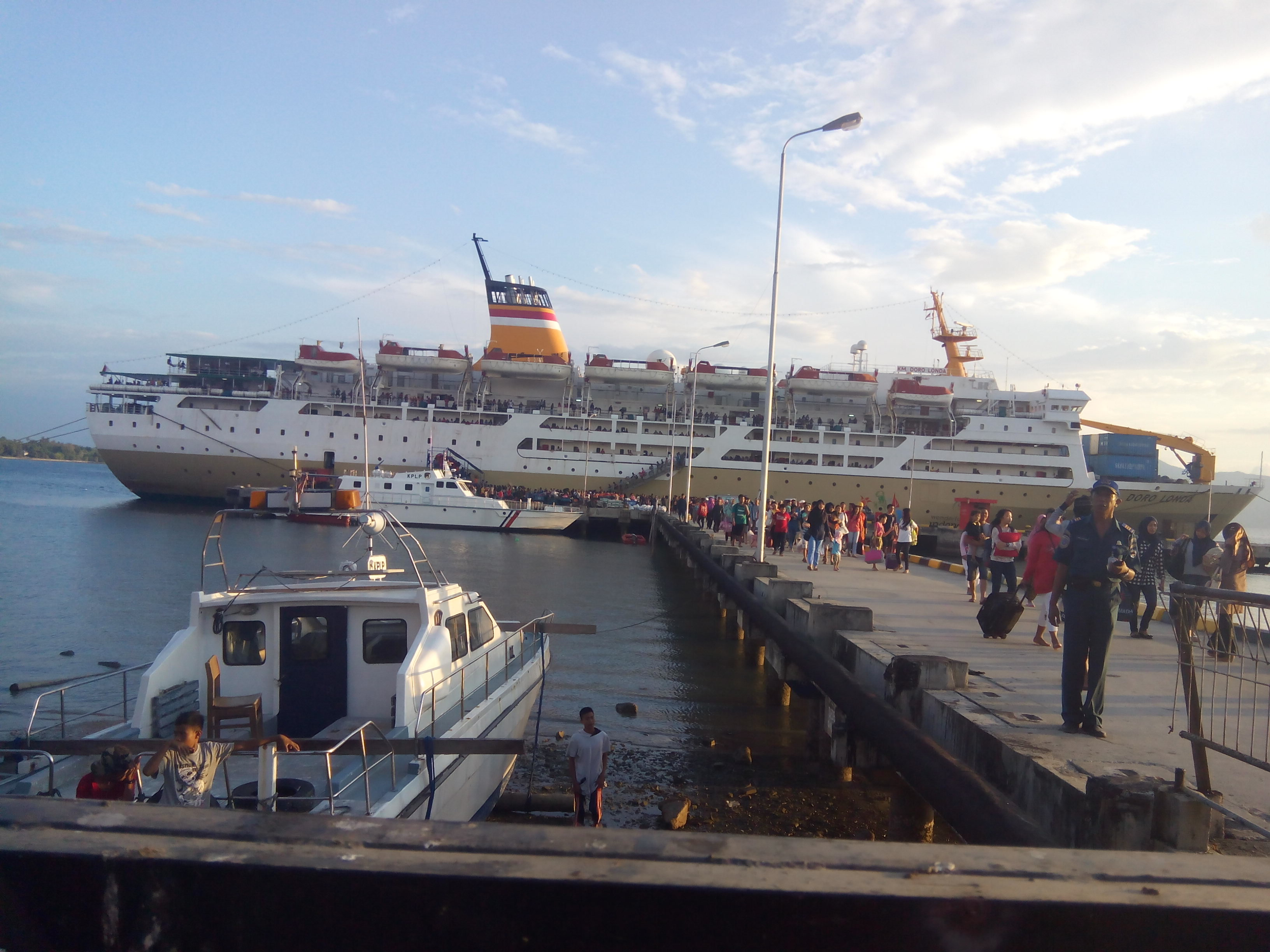
Pelni ship KM Dorolonda at port of Pantoloan, Palu, Central Sulawesi

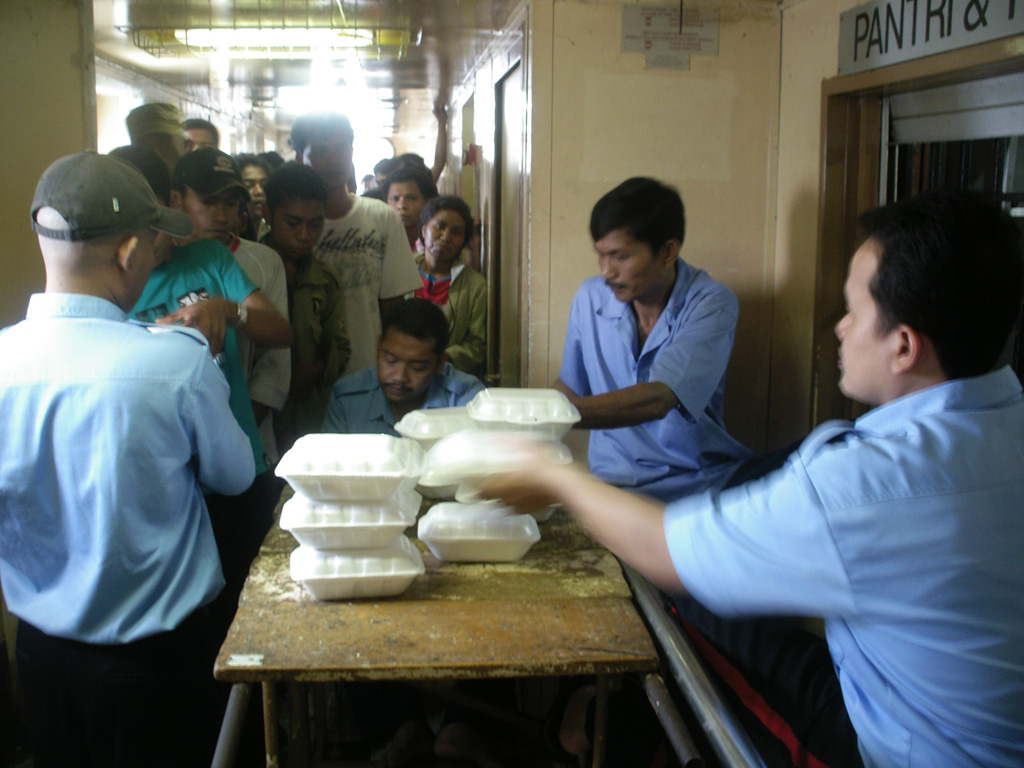
Dinner time onboard

Pelni (abbreviation of Pelayaran Nasional Indonesia, lit. 'Indonesian National Shipping') is the national cargo and passenger shipping company of Indonesia. Its services network spans across the Indonesian archipelago. Mainly serving as connector between bigger cities and to remote islands, Pelni plays an important role in the Indonesian transport system.

Pelni is one of the few remaining economy-class long-distance passenger ship operators. Most of the world's well-known passenger ship companies have stopped their low-budget passenger services since the 1960s due to shifting trends towards air transport. Pelni's ability to survive is mostly due to monopolies on certain routes and government of Indonesia subsidies.

== History ==
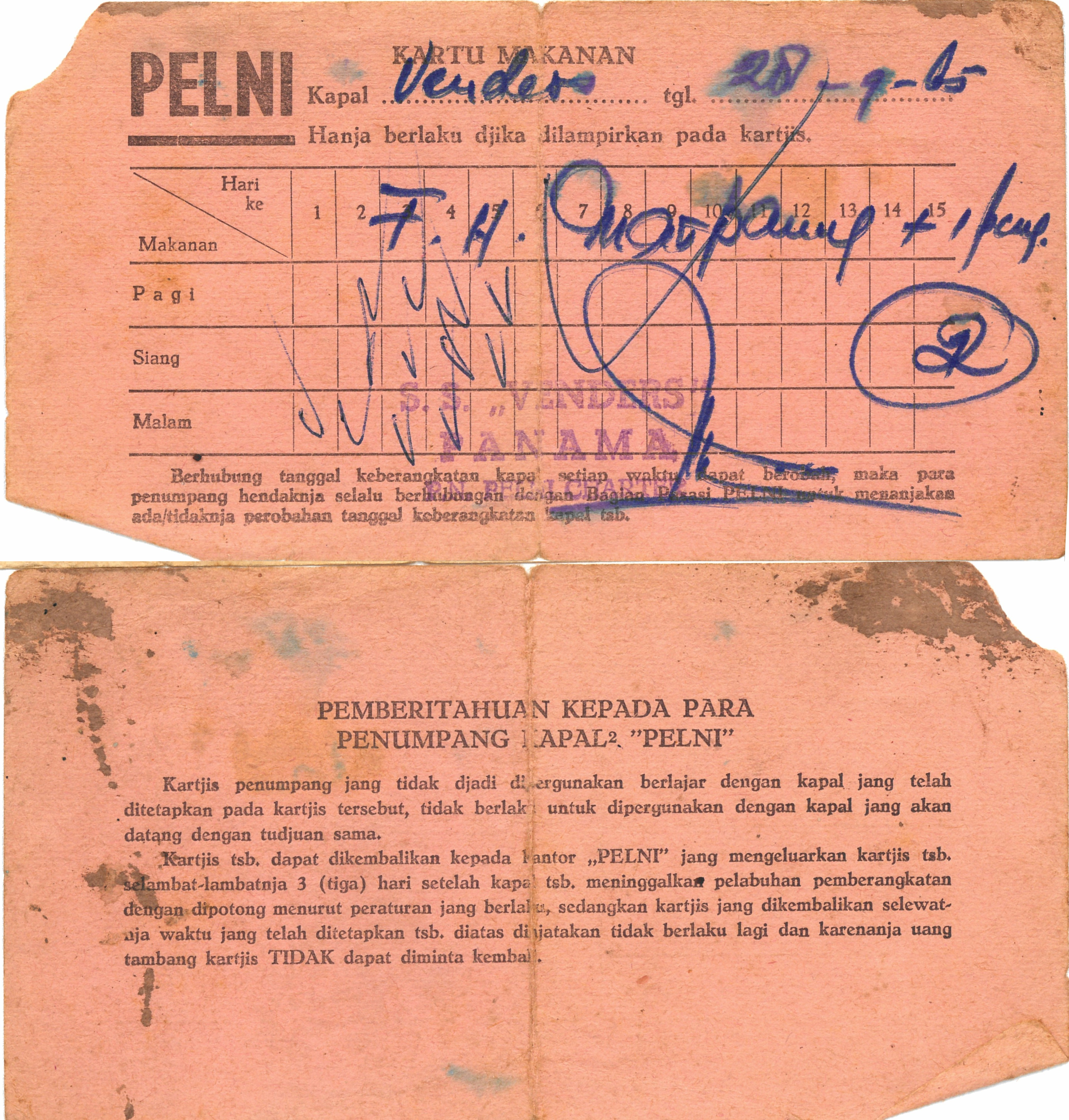
Food Rationing Card issued by Pelni in 1965

Under the Dutch colonial rule, Indonesian inter-islands transportation was dominated by Koninklijke Paketvaart-Maatschappij (KPM), founded in 1888. KPM headquarter was in Amsterdam, but daily operations were controlled from Batavia, Dutch East Indies (now Jakarta).

As a newly independent republic in the late 1940s, Indonesian government decided to nationalize Dutch-owned companies. The Dutch refused to give away KPM, due to its strong position as a connector of the Indonesian archipelago. KPM also played an important role in transporting Dutch logistics and military supplies during the Indonesian National Revolution.

In response to Dutch refusal, on 5 September 1950, Indonesia founded PEPUSKA (Yayasan Penguasaan Pusat Kapal-kapal, Centrally-controlled Ships Foundation) that operates eight ships with a total size of 4.800 Deadweight tonnage. However, due to a lack of experience and capital, PEPUSKA failed to take over KPM's monopoly.

On 28 April 1952, PEPUSKA was dissolved. Pelni (now as a company, not a foundation) was founded on the same day, with the same fleet. To bring more power, Indonesian Eximbank provided funding to buy 45 new coaster ships from western European countries. While waiting for these new ships to be produced, Pelni rented various ships from many countries across the world. Pelni also used ships looted from Japan in World War 2. These strategies proved successful, as KPM suffered from declining market share and strike workers led by Sukarno's leftist doctrine. KPM discontinued its Indonesian operation on 3 December 1957.

Pelni achieved its golden era during the early 1980s to late 1990s. Under Suharto’s presidency with his Transmigration program, Pelni was the main transport to move people from Java and Sumatra to eastern regions of Indonesia, because air transport facilities were still underdeveloped.

Pelni started to suffer in the 2000s, as air travel became cheaper. Some of its old ships even failed to sell to third parties, and maintaining these ships was expensive. KM Kambuna (renamed KRI Tanjung Nusanive (973)) and KM Rinjani (renamed KRI Tanjung Fatagar (974)) was granted to the Indonesian Navy in 2004. KM Kerinci was sold in 2014. KFC Jetliner was rented to the Sri Lankan Navy between 2009 and 2012. As of 2017, no party is interested to buy KM Ganda Dewata (Ro-ro ship) even as scrap.

Pelni started to reform its services and management since 2012, by focusing more on tourism and cargo market, alongside improving its current low-budget passenger services. Pelni began to book positive earnings since 2014.

== Ships and services ==
=== Passenger ships ===
Pelni's passenger ships are also a major branding feature of Pelni: large yellow funnel with red-and-white strips and Pelni logo. Pelni painted its ships with white color on the upper side of ships and crimson on the lower side. Its reddish lifeboats are also easily recognised from distances.

Most of these passenger ships (excluding KM Egon, KM Ganda Dewata & KFC Jetliner) were built by Meyer Werft, a major German shipyard well known as luxury passenger ships builder. Due to this, some considered Pelni's ships 'too good' by Indonesian standards, even after designed & built as economy-class passenger ships by default. As of 12 August 2017, no Meyer-built Pelni ship has ever sunk. However, these high-standard ships were not enjoyed by passengers, especially prior to 2014, because of harsh treatment by passengers and the crew itself. Most of the problems come from illegal passengers, which at least until 24 April 2019 are still frequently found.

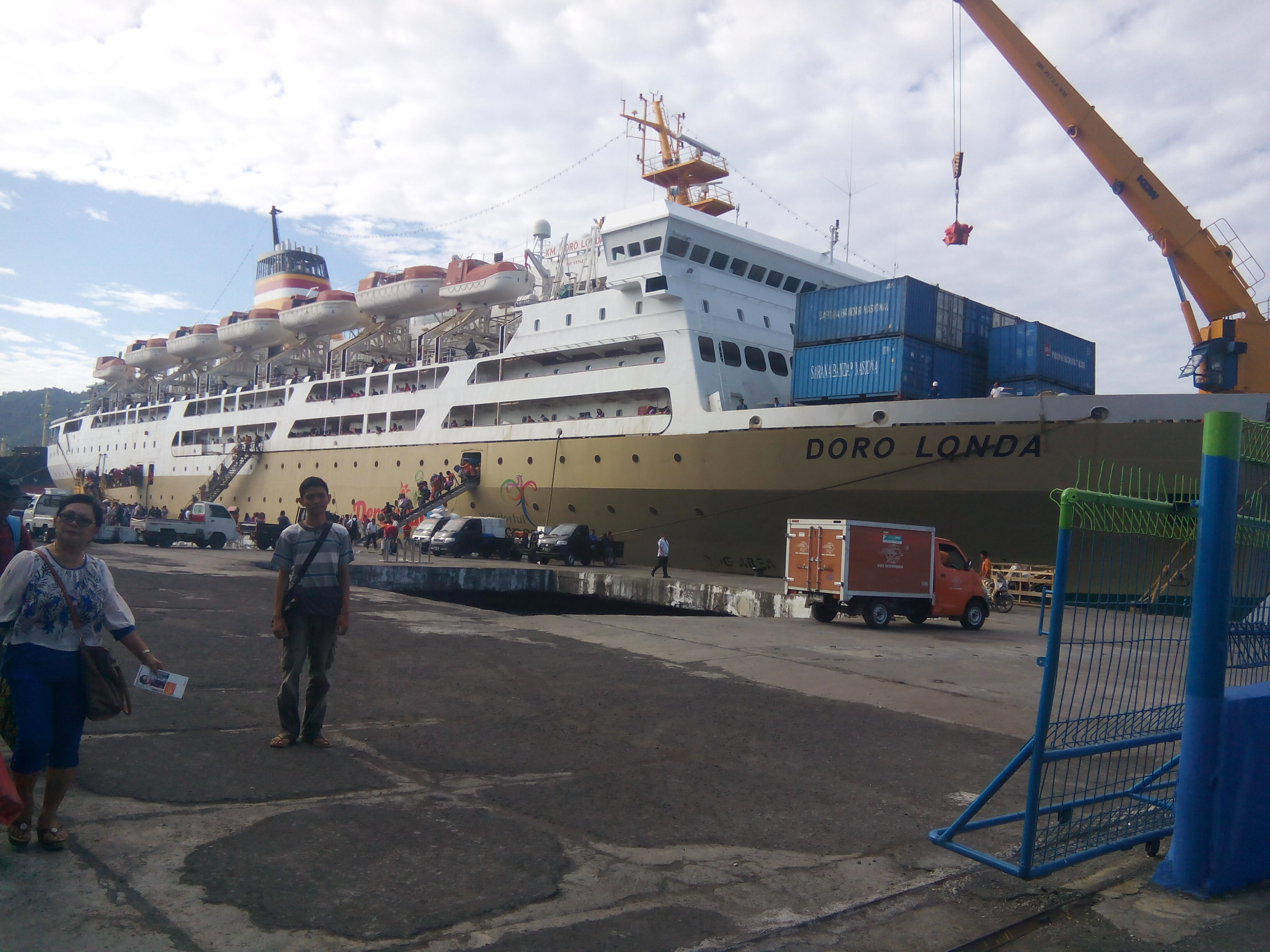
KM Dorolonda while unloading cargo & Passenger at port of Bitung

Since 2014 onwards, some improvements have been made. Online booking was made available, but still limited to payment via Bank Rakyat Indonesia's ATM and Indomaret store. Credit card payment is still not possible. Toilet facilities were improved, and 2-pin electric sockets were installed. GSM & GPRS networks on Pelni ships are provided by telkomsel. However, passenger management is still troublesome, mainly because most of Indonesian seaport's passenger terminals (operated by Indonesia Port Corporations) are not sterile from illegal visitors.

Below is a list of Pelni's Passenger Ships. All of these ships (excluding KFC Jetliner) were named after mountains in Indonesia. KM Tatamailau however, is named after Mt. Tatamailau in East Timor. km is an abbreviation of 'Kapal Mesin', meaning Motor Vessel (MV) and KFC is an abbreviation of 'Kapal Ferry Cepat', meaning Fast Ferry Ship.

=== Current Ships (as of January 2025) ===
Ship name	Tonnage	Build date	Passenger capacity	Route (as of January 2025)
KM Awu	6,022 GT	1991	969	route A: Kumai (Panglima Utar Port) → Surabaya (Tanjung Perak Port) → Denpasar (Benoa Port) → Bima → Waingapu → Ende (IPPI Port) → Kupang (Tenau Port) → Kalabahi (round-trip) route B: Kumai (Panglima Utar Port) → Semarang (Tanjung Emas Port) (round-trip)
KM Binaya	6,022 GT	1994	1000	route A: Denpasar (Benoa Port) → Bima → Labuan Bajo → Makassar (Soekarno Hatta Port) → Awerange → Bontang (Lok Tuan Port) → Pare-Pare (Nusantara Port) (round-trip) route B: Denpasar (Benoa Port) → Bima → Waingapu → Ende (IPPI Port) → Kupang (Tenau Port) (round-trip)
KM Bukit Raya	6,022 GT	1994	970	Jakarta (Tanjung Priok Port) → Belinyu (Tanjung Gudang Port) → Kijang (Sri Bayintan Port) → Letung → Tarempa → Natuna (Selat Lampa Port) → Midai → Serasan (Tanjung Setelung Port) → Pontianak (Dwikora Port) → Surabaya (Tanjung Perak Port) (round-trip)
KM Bukit Siguntang		1995	2003	route A: Makassar (Soekarno Hatta Port) → Maumere (Laurentius Say Port) → Lewoleba → Kupang (Tenau Port) (round-trip) route B: Makassar (Soekarno Hatta Port) → Pare-Pare (Nusantara Port) → Balikpapan (Semayang Port) → Tarakan (Malundung Port) → Nunukan (Tunon Taka Port) → Balikpapan (Semayang Port) → Pare-Pare (Nusantara Port) → Makassar (Soekarno Hatta Port)
KM Ciremai		1991	1973	Jakarta (Tanjung Priok Port) → Surabaya (Tanjung Perak Port) → Makassar (Soekarno Hatta Port) → Bau-Bau (Murhum Port) → Ambon (Yos Soedarso Port) → Sorong → Serui → Jayapura (round-trip) Often Manokwari, Biak and Namlea are added to the route.
KM Dobonsolo		1993	1974	route A: Jakarta (Tanjung Priok Port) → Surabaya (Tanjung Perak Port) → Makassar (Soekarno Hatta Port) → Bau-Bau (Murhum Port) → Sorong → Manokwari → Biak → Jayapura (round-trip) route B: Jakarta (Tanjung Priok Port) → Surabaya (Tanjung Perak Port) → Makassar (Soekarno Hatta Port) → Bau-Bau (Murhum Port) → Sorong → Manokwari (round-trip)
KM Dorolonda		2001	2130	route A: Surabaya (Tanjung Perak Port) → Balikpapan (Semayang Port) → Pantoloan → Bitung → Ternate (Ahmad Yani Port) → Sorong → Manokwari → Nabire (Samabusa Port) → Jayapura (round-trip) route B: Surabaya (Tanjung Perak Port) → Makassar (Soekarno Hatta Port) → Bau-Bau (Murhum Port) → Namlea → Ambon (Yos Soedarso Port) → Sorong → Manokwari → Nabire (Samabusa Port) → Waren → Jayapura (round-trip)
KM Egon	4,914 GT	1991	520	Waingapu → Lembar → Surabaya (Tanjung Perak Port) → Batulicin (Samudra Port) → Pare-Pare (Nusantara Port) → Bontang (Lok Tuan Port) (round-trip)
KM Gunung Dempo		2006	1583	Jakarta (Tanjung Priok Port) → Surabaya (Tanjung Perak Port) → Makassar (Soekarno Hatta Port) → Sorong → Manokwari → Wasior → Nabire (Samabusa Port) → Jayapura (round-trip)
KM Kelimutu		1985	920	route A: Jakarta (Tanjung Priok Port) → Belitung (Tanjung Pandan Port) → Pontianak (Dwikora Port) → Semarang (Tanjung Emas Port) → Kumai (Panglima Utar Port) (round-trip) route B: Jakarta (Tanjung Priok Port) → Belitung (Tanjung Pandan Port) → Pontianak (Dwikora Port) → Semarang (Tanjung Emas Port) → Kumai (Panglima Utar Port) → Surabaya (Tanjung Perak Port) → Batulicin (Samudra Port) (round-trip)
KM Kelud	14,665 GT	1998	1906	Jakarta (Tanjung Priok Port) → Batam (Batu Ampar Port) → Tanjung Balai Karimun → Medan (Belawan Port) (round-trip)
KM Lawit		1986	920	route A: Kumai (Panglima Utar Port) → Surabaya (Tanjung Perak Port) → Sampit → Semarang (Tanjung Emas Port) → Karimun Jawa (Legon Bajak Port) → Surabaya (Tanjung Perak Port) → Kumai (Panglima Utar Port) (round-trip) route B: Kumai (Panglima Utar Port) → Surabaya (Tanjung Perak Port) → Denpasar (Benoa Port) → Bima → Waingapu → Ende (IPPI Port) → Kalabahi → Kupang (Tenau Port) → Rote (round-trip)
KM Leuser		1994	970	Surabaya (Tanjung Perak Port) → Denpasar (Benoa Port) → Bima → Labuan Bajo → Makassar (Soekarno Hatta Port) → Bau-Bau (Murhum Port) → Wanci (Panggulubelo Port) → Namrole → Ambon (Yos Soedarso Port) → Saumlaki → Tual → Dobo → Timika (Pomako Port) → Agats → Merauke (round-trip)
KM Lambelu		1996	2003	Makassar (Soekarno Hatta Port) → Pare-Pare (Nusantara Port) → Balikpapan (Semayang Port) → Tarakan (Malundung Port) → Nunukan (Tunon Taka Port) → Pantoloan → Balikpapan (Semayang Port) → Pare-Pare (Nusantara Port) → Makassar (Soekarno Hatta Port) → Bau-Bau (Murhum Port) → Maumere (Laurentius Say Port) → Larantuka → Bau-Bau (Murhum Port) → Makassar (Soekarno Hatta Port) → Pare-Pare (Nusantara Port) → Balikpapan (Semayang Port) → Pantoloan → Tarakan (Malundung Port) → Nunukan (Tunon Taka Port) → Balikpapan (Semayang Port) → Pare-Pare (Nusantara Port) → Makassar (Soekarno Hatta Port)
KM Labobar		2004	3084	Jakarta (Tanjung Priok Port) → Surabaya (Tanjung Perak Port) → Makassar (Soekarno Hatta Port) → Bau-Bau (Murhum Port) → Ambon (Yos Soedarso Port) → Banda Neira → Tual → Dobo → Kaimana → Fak-Fak (round-trip)
KM Nggapulu		2001	2130	Jakarta (Tanjung Priok Port) → Surabaya (Tanjung Perak Port) → Makassar (Soekarno Hatta Port) → Bau-Bau (Murhum Port) → Namlea → Ambon (Yos Soedarso Port) → Ternate (Ahmad Yani Port) → Jailolo → Bitung (round-trip)
KM Pangrango		1996	496	route A: Ambon (Yos Soedarso Port) → Banda Neira (round-trip) route B: Ambon (Yos Soedarso Port) → Namrole (round-trip) route C: Ambon (Yos Soedarso Port) → Banda Neira → Saumlaki (round-trip)
KM Sirimau		1991	969	Sorong → Ambon (Yos Soedarso Port) → Wanci (Panggulubelo Port) → Bau-Bau (Murhum Port) → Maumere (Laurentius Say Port) → Lewoleba → Kupang (Tenau Port) → Kalabahi → Saumlaki → Tual → Dobo → Timika (Pomako Port) → Agats → Merauke (round-trip)
KM Sinabung		1997	1906	Surabaya (Tanjung Perak Port) → Makassar (Soekarno Hatta Port) → Bau-Bau (Murhum Port) → Banggai → Bitung → Ternate (Ahmad Yani Port) → Bacan → Sorong → Manokwari → Biak → Jayapura (round-trip)
KM Sangiang		1997	510	Bitung → Ternate (Ahmad Yani Port) → Bacan → Sanana → Namlea → Ambon (Yos Soedarso Port) → Banda Neira → Geser → Fak-Fak (round-trip)
KM Tilongkabila		1994	970	Denpasar (Benoa Port) → Lembar (Gili Mas Port) → Bima → Labuan Bajo → Makassar (Soekarno Hatta Port) → Bau-Bau (Murhum Port) → Raha → Kendari (Bungkutoko Port) → Luwuk → Gorontalo → Bitung (round-trip)
KM Tatamailau		1990	969	route A: Bitung → Tidore (Trikora Port) → Sorong → Fak-Fak → Kaimana → Tual → Timika (Pomako Port) → Agats → Merauke (round-trip) route B: Bitung → Ternate (Ahmad Yani Port) → Ambon (Yos Soedarso Port) → Tual → Dobo → Timika (Pomako Port) → Agats → Merauke (round-trip)
KM Tidar		1987	1904	Kijang (Sri Bayintan Port) → Jakarta (Tanjung Priok Port) → Surabaya (Tanjung Perak Port) → Makassar (Soekarno Hatta Port) → Bau-Bau (Murhum Port) → Maumere (Laurentius Say Port) → Larantuka → Lewoleba → Kupang (Tenau Port) (round-trip)
KM Umsini		1985	1737	Route 1 : Jakarta > Surabaya > Makassar > Maumere > Larantuka > Lewoleba > Kupang > Ende; Route 2 : Jakarta > Bintan
KM Wilis		1999	500	Batulicin (Samudra Port) → Makassar (Soekarno Hatta Port) → Labuan Bajo → Bima → Waikelo → Waingapu → Ende (IPPI Port) → Kupang (Tenau Port) → Kalabahi (round-trip)
KFC Jetliner		1996	550	Kendari (Bungkutoko Port) → Wanci (Panggulubelo Port) → Kendari (Bungkutoko Port) → Wanci (Panggulubelo Port) → Kendari (Bungkutoko Port) → Raha (round-trip)

==== Facilities ====
- One single bed per passenger, but shared space with others and no barriers between beds.
- 2-pin electric plugs per bed (low voltage, for mobile phones only)
- Shared bathrooms & toilets with hot and cold water
- Three standard meals a day
- Hot water for making drinks
- Musalla
- Cafeteria
- Shop
- Smoking area
- GSM and GPRS network by Telkomsel
- Clinic

===== Facilities (KM Kelud only) =====
KM Kelud (serving Jakarta-Batam-Tanjung Balai Karimun-Medan) is the ship with most complete facilities:

- Restaurant
- Wi-Fi (paid)
- Mini cinema
- Alfamart and Pelnimart store
- Gym
- Live music

KM Kelud also provides first- and 2nd-class service in addition to economy-class services, with double bedroom and four single-bedroom options, with television and better food menus.

However, not all of those facilities are always available. Some passengers wrote that access to some of those, such as mini-cinema and gym were blocked by the crew. Some facilities, especially the toilets, are in poor condition. The ships are also often overcrowded by illegal passengers, especially after embarking from smaller ports where security is lax.

==== Tourism services ====
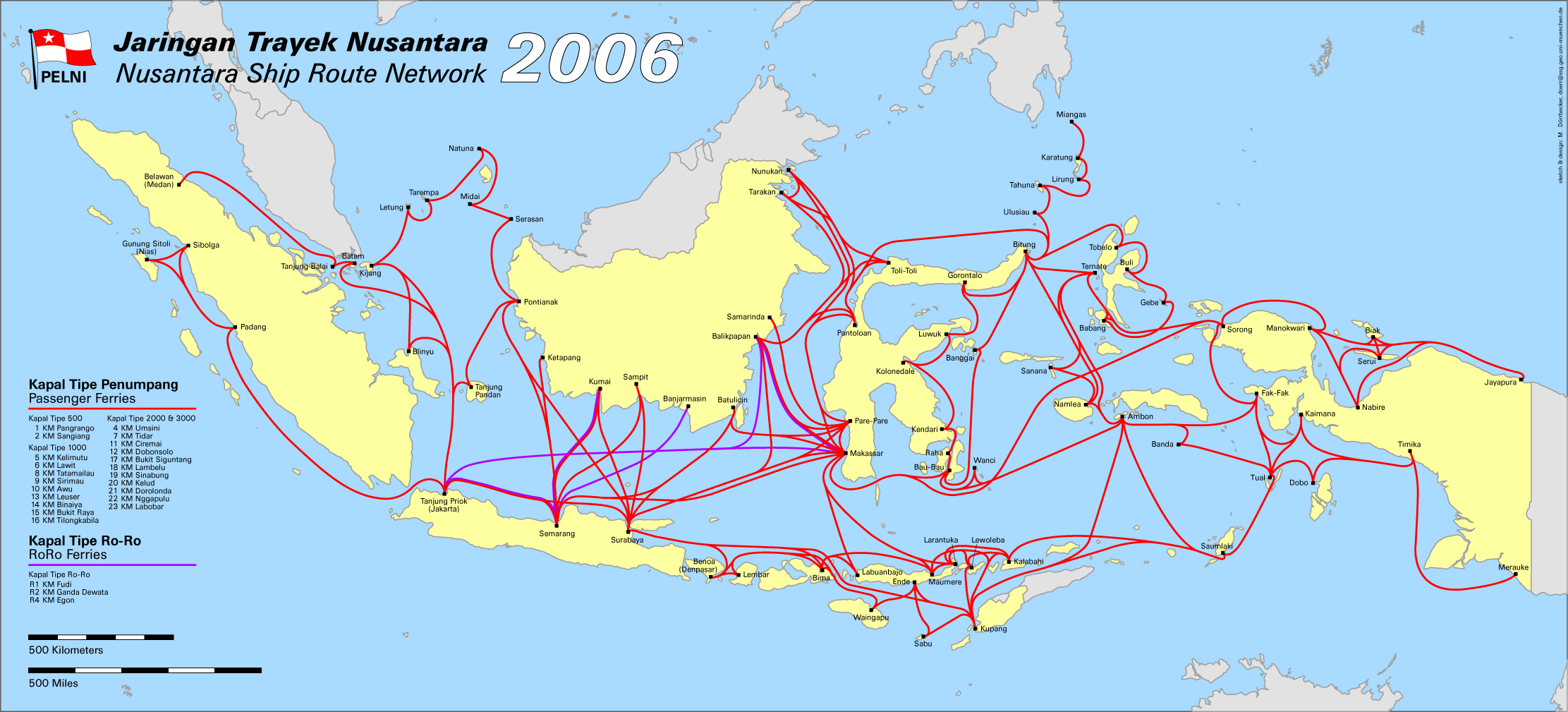
Pelni's Shipping Routes, 2006

In addition to regular passenger routes, Pelni provides tourism packages to various islands. Pelni introduces live-on-board concept, where Pelni ships will pick up passengers in hub ports (such as Semarang or Sorong), sail to destined tourist attraction, stay there as 'floating hotel' while passengers enjoying the tourism packages in nearby islands, and then return to hub port. For 2017, the tourism packages are:

- Karimunjava Islands (depart from Semarang)
- Raja Ampat Islands (from Sorong)
- Derawan Islands (from Balikpapan)
- Wakatobi National Park (from Baubau)
- Komodo National Park (from Labuan Bajo)
- Banda Neira (from Ambon)

On 23 June 2019, Pelni launched a new tourism service with KLM (Kapal Layar Mesin/Motor Sail Ship) Pelita Arunika, a pinisi ship. Built by a traditional shipbuilder in Tanjung Bira, South Sulawesi, it serves tourists in Labuan Bajo.

=== Cargo ships ===
- KM Caraka Jaya Niaga III-4
- KM Caraka Jaya Niaga III-2
- KM Caraka Jaya Niaga III-32
- KM Logistik Nusantara 1
- KM Logistik Nusantara 2
- KM Logistik Nusantara 3
- KM Logistik Nusantara 4
- KM Logistik Nusantara 5

=== Other ships ===
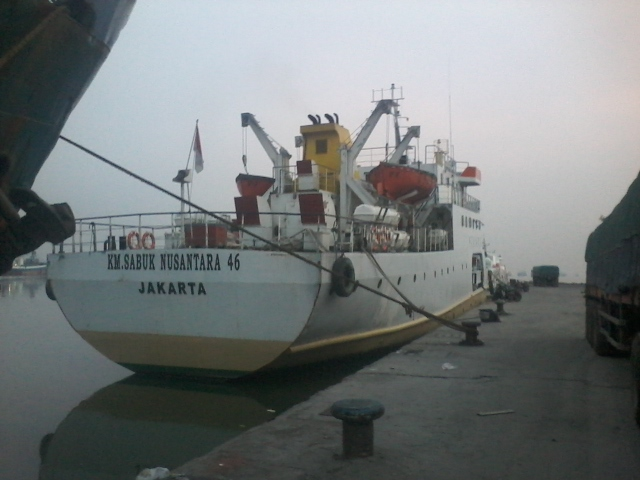
KM Sabuk Nusantara 46, one of kapal perintis (pioneer ship) operated by Pelni, serving Sunda Kelapa-Thousand Islands (Indonesia)

==== Tol Laut ships ====
Tol Laut (literally "Sea Toll (Road)" or "Sea Highway") is a maritime program by President Joko Widodo to improve the Indonesian logistic system through providing routine and subsidized cargo sailing across Indonesia. As of 2019, Pelni operated 7 cargo ships for this purpose.

==== Cattle ship ====
Pelni operated one cattle ship, KM Camara Nusantara I, to transport cattle produced by farmers in Lesser Sunda Islands to Java.

==== Perintis ships ====
Perintis (pioneer) services are routes served by smaller ships (below 500 passengers) connecting smaller islands to regional cities. these services are subsidized by the Government of Indonesia. It is intended to increase accessibility and decrease logistic cost among small islands. These routes are less regular than those served by the main passenger ships, thus online ticket booking is not available. Tickets can be bought at the port of departure or its nearest branch offices. Perintis schedules can also be accessed through Pelni call center and social media upon request. As of 2019, Pelni owned and operated 53 perintis ships, serving 46 routes.

=== International routes ===
During the Indonesian occupation of East Timor, Pelni served the port of Dili, which stopped after 1999. In 2000, Pelni also served the Bitung-Davao (Philippines) route for a short period.

== Incidents and accidents ==
- On 27 January 1981, Pelni's ship KMP Tampomas II was burned and sank near Masalembu Islands in the Java Sea while sailing from Port of Tanjung Priok, Jakarta to Makassar. This ship was built in 1956 by Mitsubishi Heavy Industries and was planned to be scrapped but was sold to Pelni instead. Officials reported 431 people were killed. Iwan Fals and Ebiet G. Ade wrote songs about the sinking.
- In the mid-1990s, KM Kerinci accidentally ran aground in the Banyur Padang Bay Area due to strong currents, causing her to list to her port side. She was repaired in neighboring countries while the route she was operating was temporarily replaced by KM Lambelu.
- On 6 April 2011, KM Fudi rolled over while being repaired in PT. PAL shipyard in Surabaya. Due to lack of funds, Pelni & PAL decided to abandon the ship and allowed Yala Gada, a cooperative from Indonesian Navy to scrap her on March 15, 2016.
- On 9 June 2024, a fire broke out on the KM Umsini while docked in Makassar Port. The source of the fire is believed to have originated from a spark from an auxiliary motor in the engine room. It was extinguished and there were no casualties.

== Gallery ==
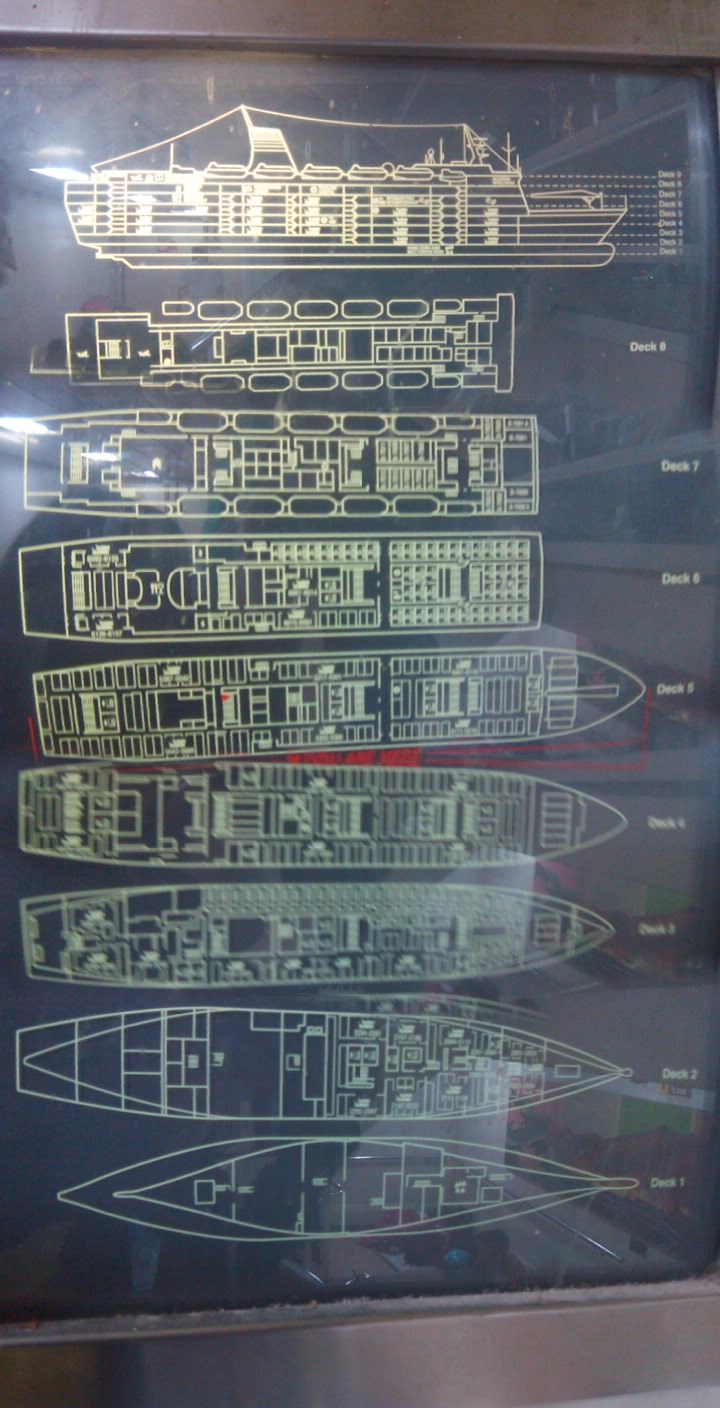
Map of KM Dorolonda

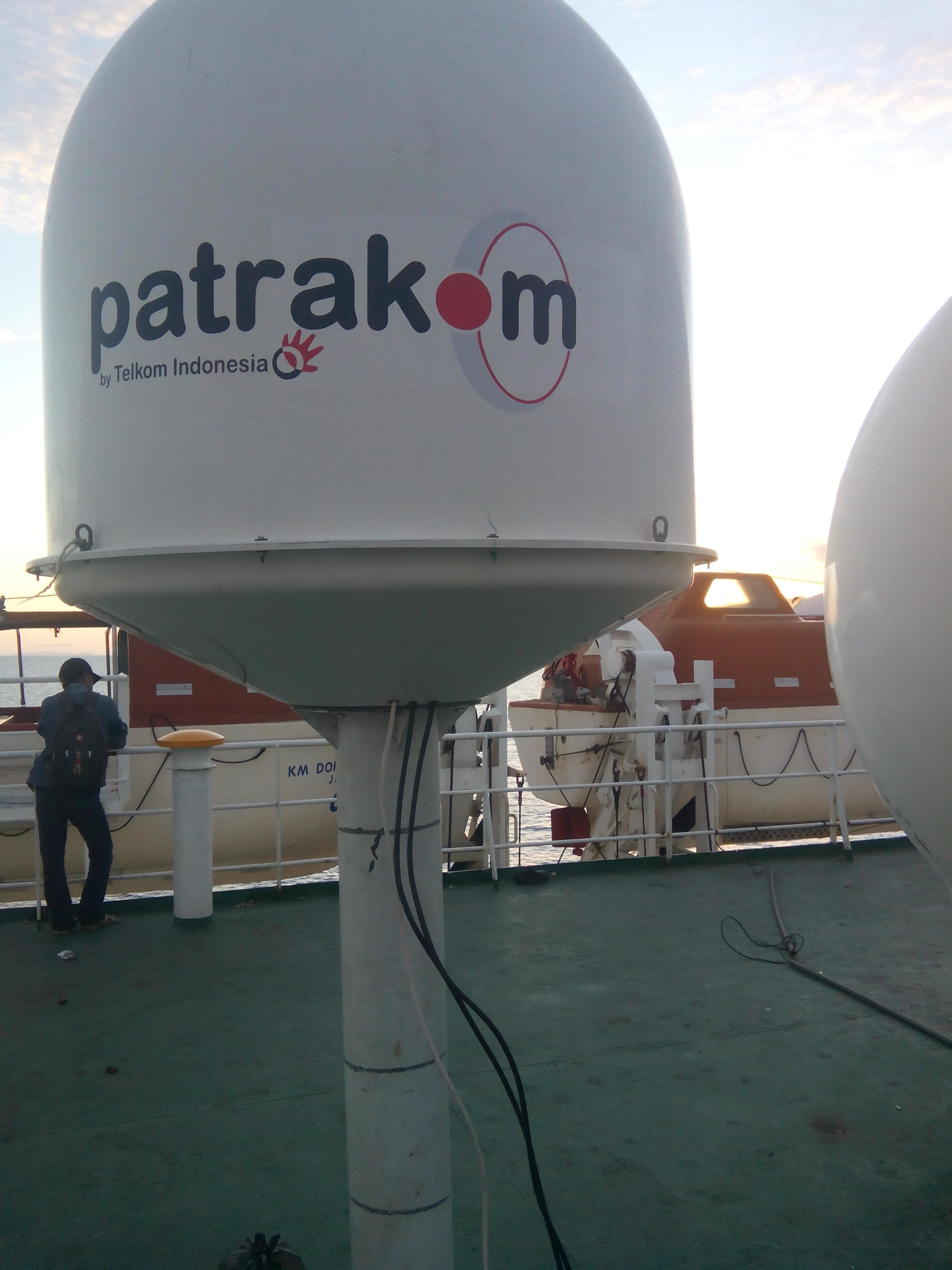
Gyro Stabilized Antenna by Telkom Indonesia in KM Dorolonda. Now every Pelni Ships provided GSM and GPRS network by Telkom's subsidiaries, Telkomsel

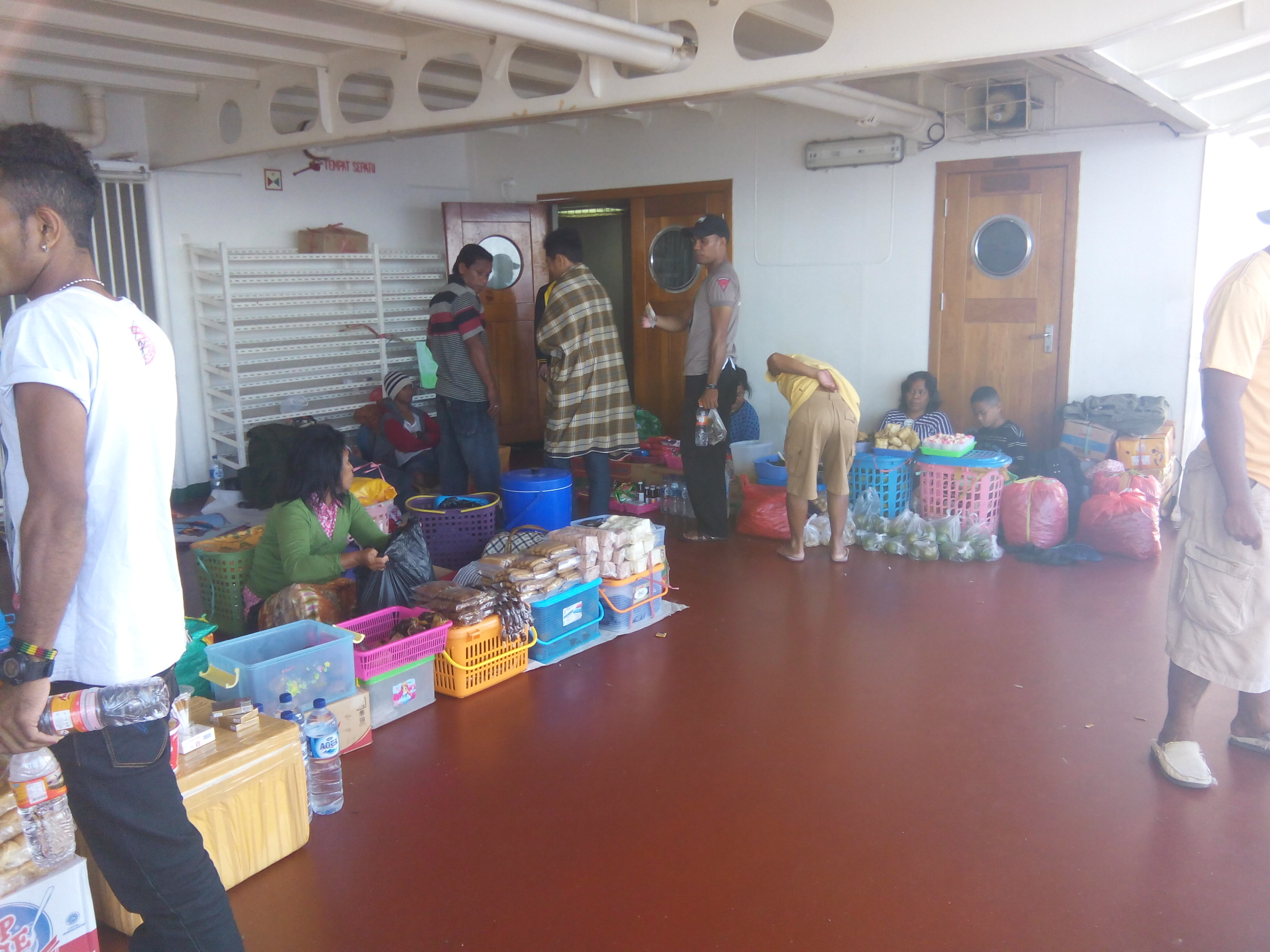
Passenger selling various foods during KM Dorolonda sailing from Sorong to Ternate. Things like this still happens when the ships visit small harbor with lack of security enforcement.

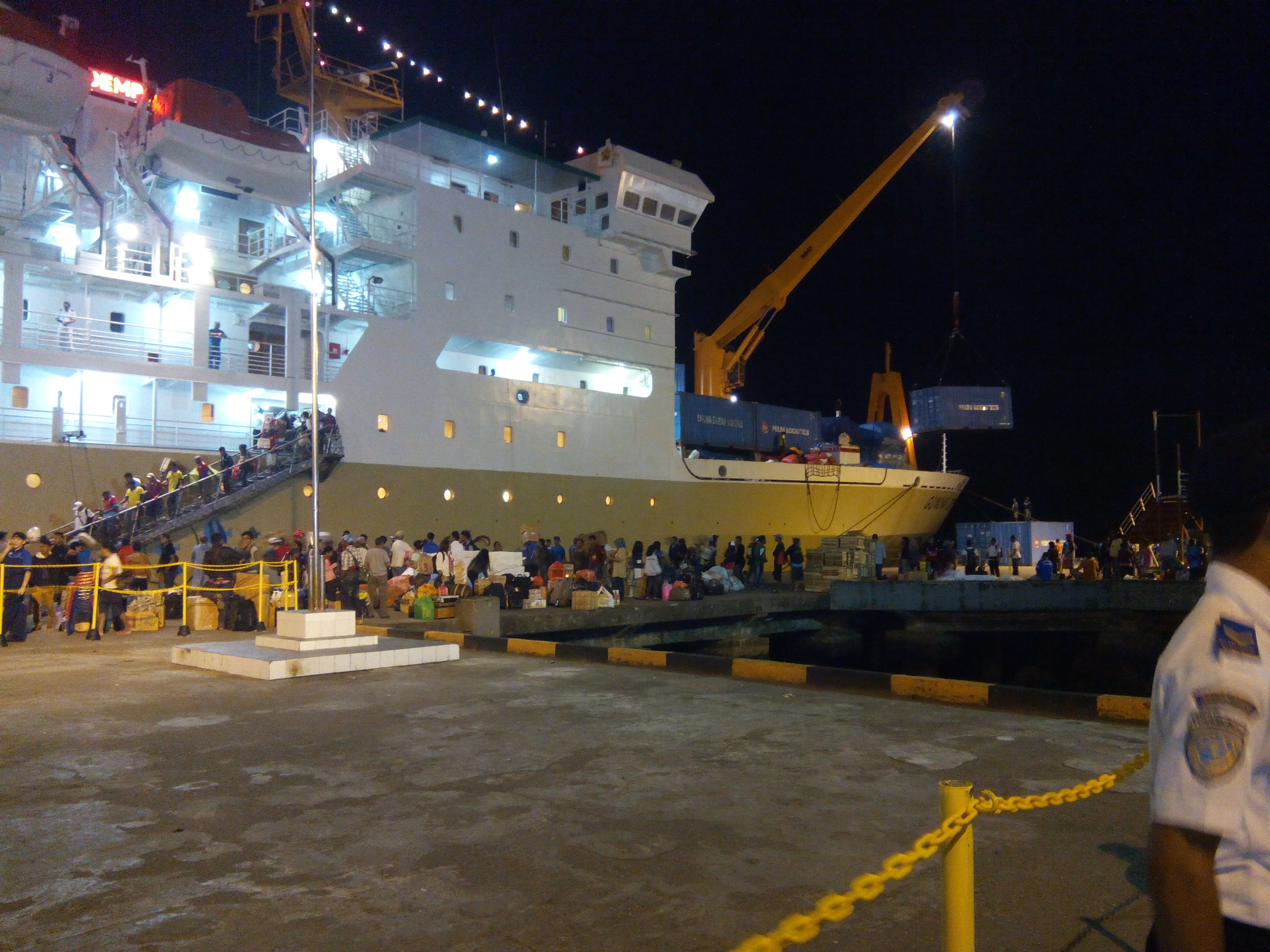
KM Gunung Dempo unloading cargo and passenger at port of Ambon.

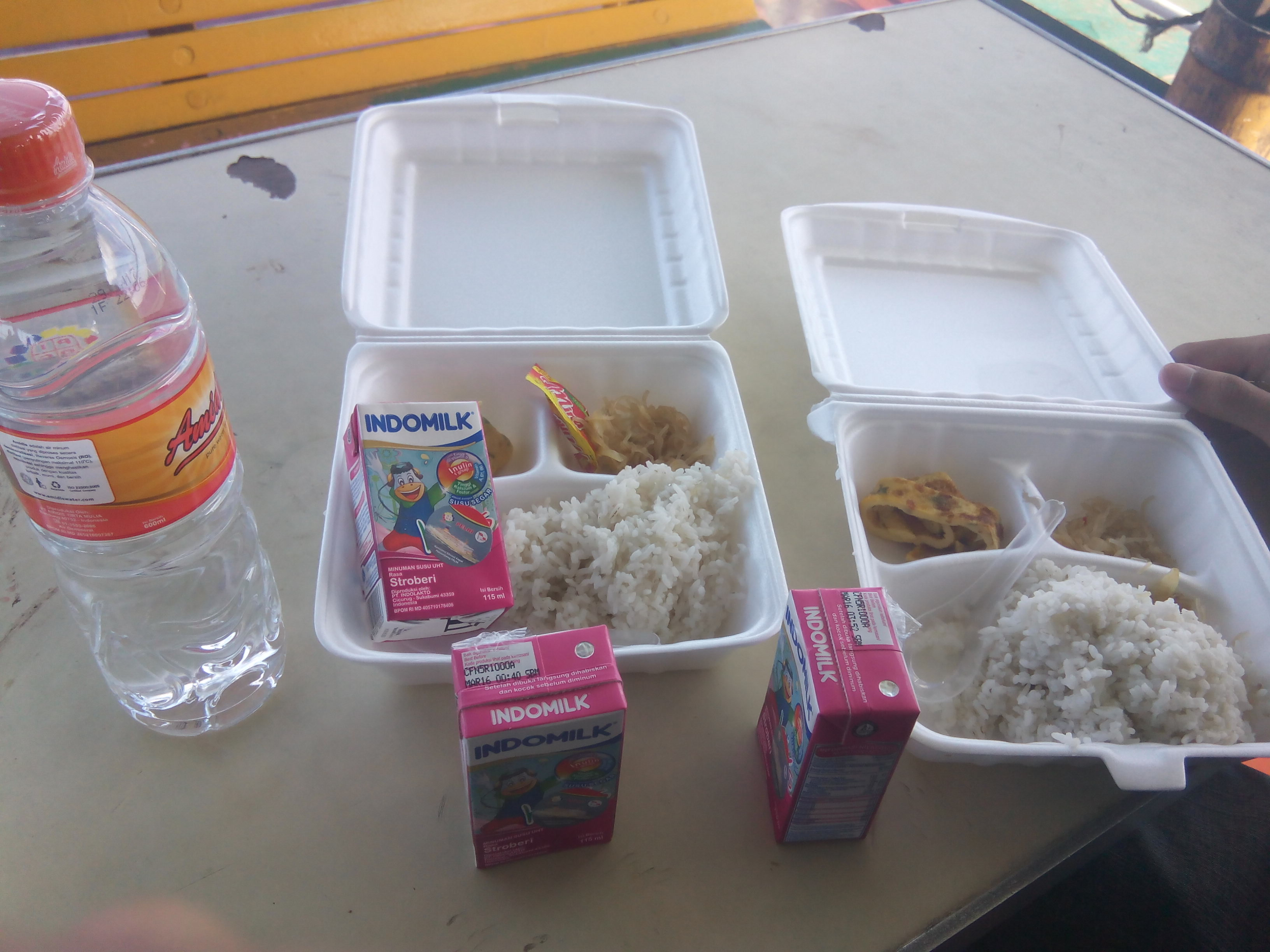
Breakfast menu at KM Gunung Dempo

Pelni's ship being used to transport Javanese people to Papua by New Order's controversial Transmigration Program

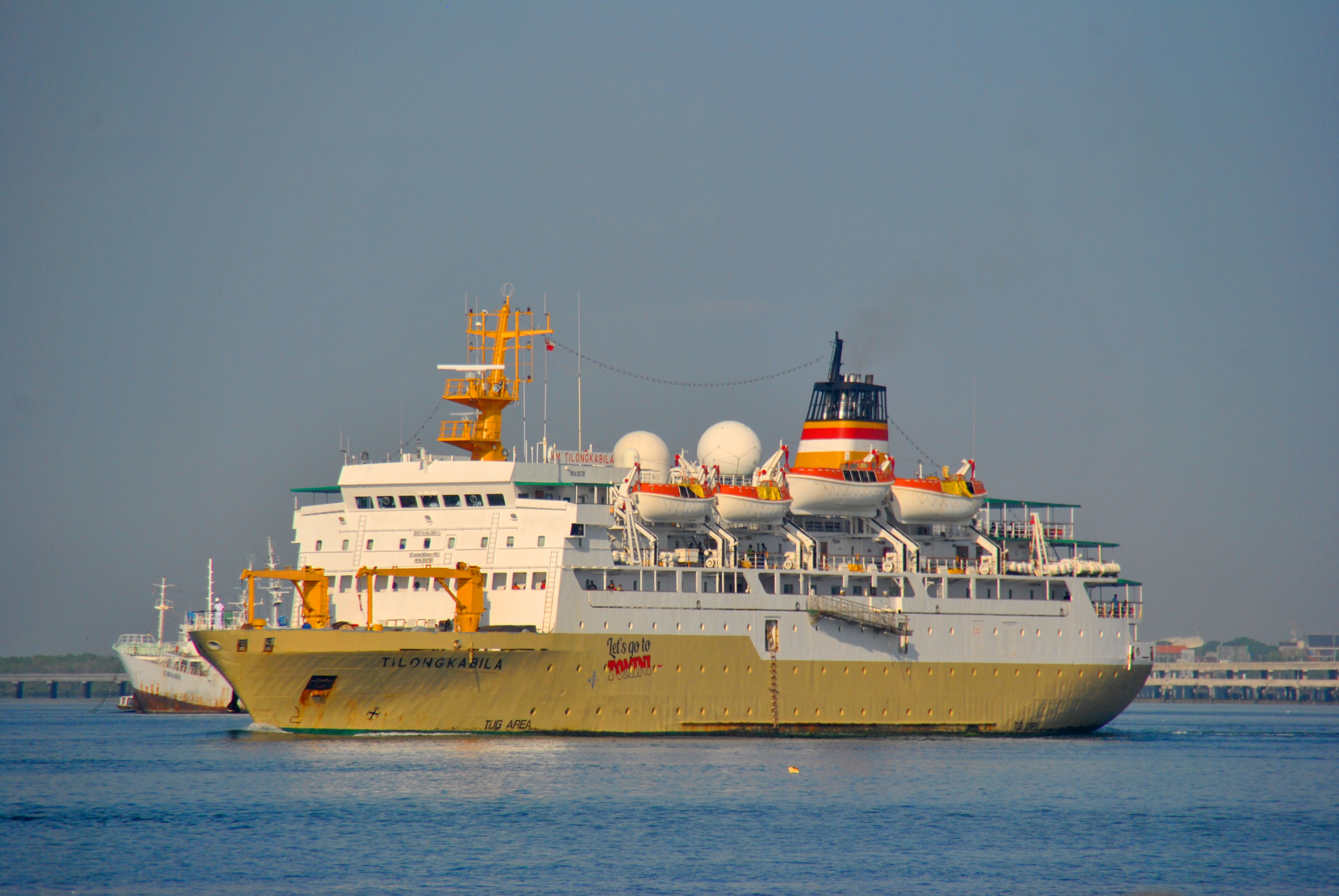
KM Tilong Kabila

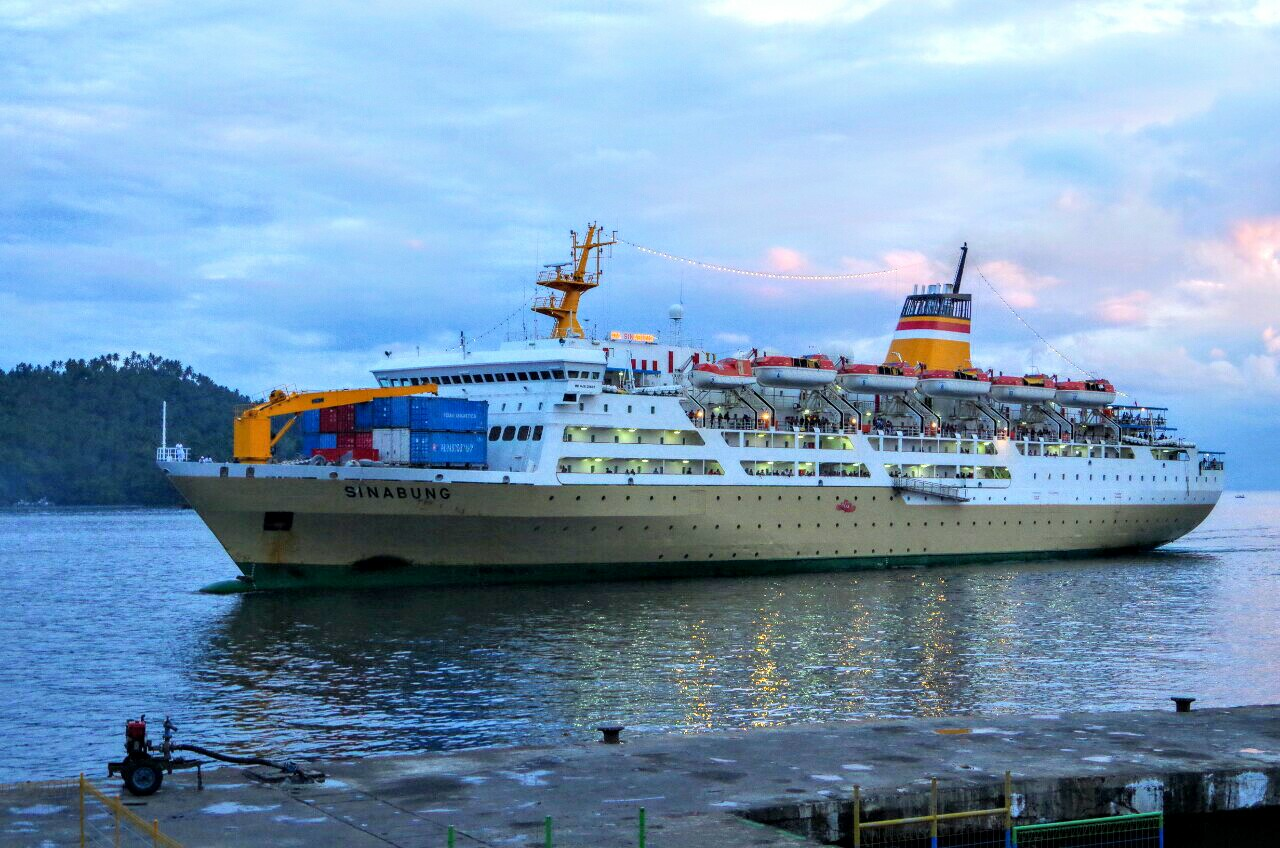
KM Sinabung

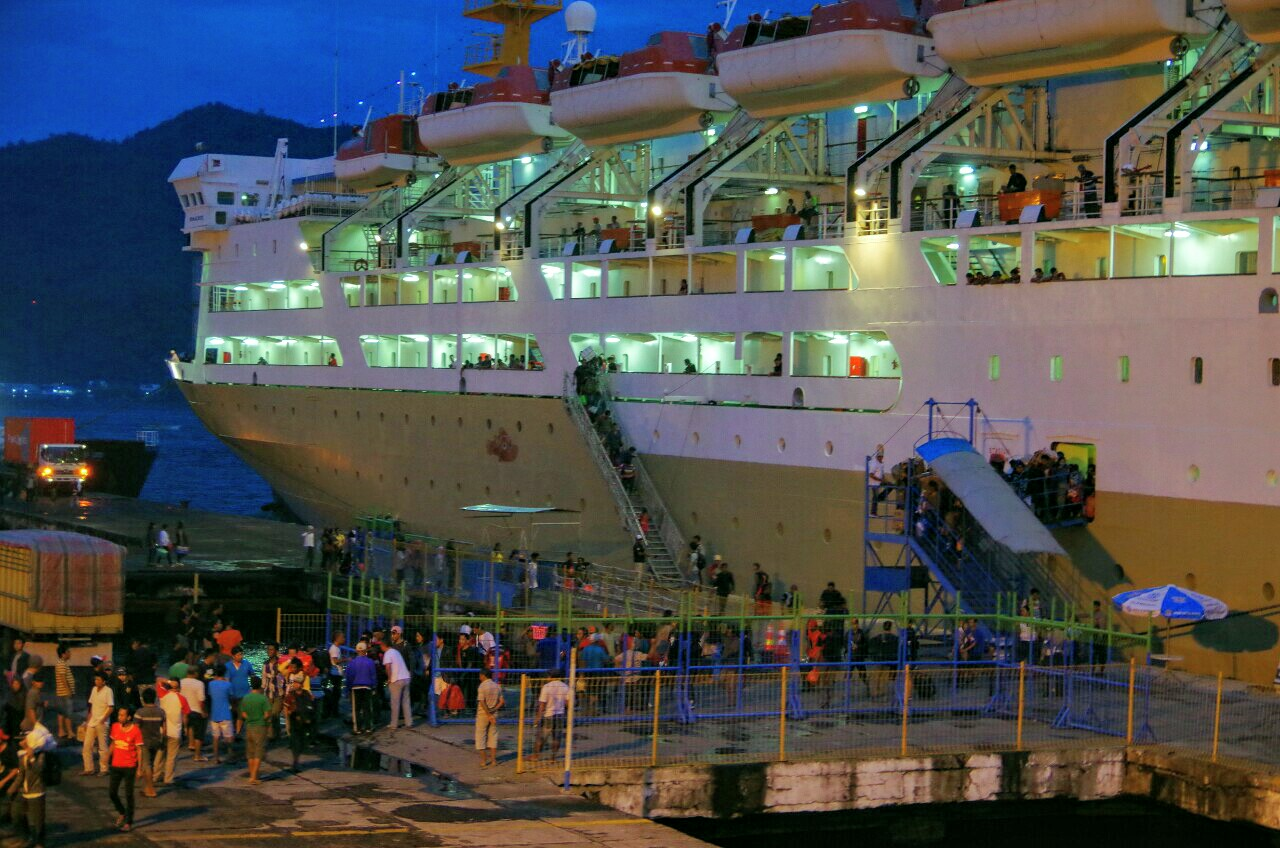
KM Sinabung disembarking passengers at Bitung Northern Sulawesi

== See also ==
- ASDP Ferry
- Transport in Indonesia
