= Zuristyo Firmadata =

Indonesian politician (1973–2025)

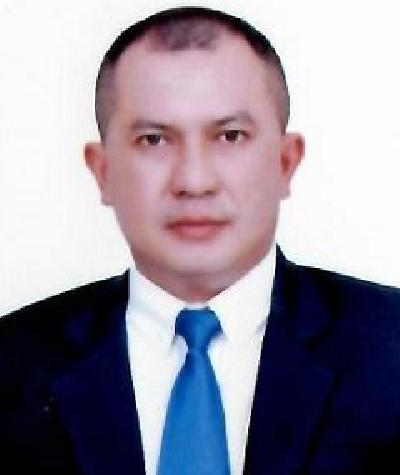
- Official portrait, 2019

Member of the House of Representatives
- In office 1 October 2019 – 30 September 2024
- Constituency: Bangka Belitung Islands
- Majority: 36,889 votes

Personal details
- Born: 7 January 1973 Muntok, Bangka Belitung, Indonesia
- Died: 22 August 2025 (aged 52) Jakarta, Indonesia
- Party: NasDem Party
- Spouse: Nguswi Mutiningsih
- Children: 3
- Education: Pelita Bangsa Economics College (S.E.); IMMI Management College (M.M.)

Zuristyo Firmadata (7 January 1973 – 22 August 2025), also known as Tyo, was an Indonesian politician who served as a member of the House of Representatives for the 2019–2024 term from NasDem. He also served as the party's chairman in Bangka Belitung from 2016 until February 2025.

== Early life and education ==
Born in Muntok, Bangka Belitung, on 7 January 1973, Zuristyo pursued his primary education at UPTB Parittiga elementary school from 1980 to 1986, followed by the 1st Parritiga State Middle School from 1986 to 1989. He then attended 23rd State High School in Jakarta, graduating in 1993. He earned a bachelor's degree in economics from Pelita Bangsa Economics College from 2005 to 2009 and a master's degree in management from IMMI Management College in Jakarta, which he completed in 2012.

== Career ==
Zuristyo's professional career began in business, where he held several key leadership roles. He served as the president director of several local mining companies, where he eventually became the chairman of the people's mining association in Bangka Belitung. He then joined the NasDem Party, becoming the chairman of the party in West Bangka Regency from 2011 to 2016 and in the Bangka Belitung Islands Provincial chapter from 2016 to 2024. In 2015, he became the chairman of the Sukirman-Safri campaign team in the West Bangka regent election.

In the 2019 legislative election, Zuristyo secured a seat in the House of Representatives, representing the Bangka Belitung Islands electoral district. About half of the votes he received – 18,635 out of 36,889 – came from the West Bangka Regency. As a member of the House of Representatives, he was assigned to Commission VI, where he worked on trade, industry, investment, and state-owned enterprises. In this role, he was a vocal advocate for strengthening the national economy through investment and consumption. In 2022, he organized a dissemination event in Pangkalpinang with the investment ministry to promote investment and accelerate its realization, particularly by engaging small and medium-sized enterprises. Zuristyo sought re-election in the 2024 Indonesian general election, but was not elected, as he came fourth with 34,280 votes. Following his loss, in February 2025 he was replaced as the chairman of the party in Bangka Belitung.

== Personal life and death ==
Zuristyo was married to Nguswi Mutiningsih and had three children. Zuristyo Firmadata died after a long illness at the Medistra Hospital in South Jakarta, on 22 August 2025, at the age of 52.
