= Port of Tanjung Api-Api =

Location
- Country: Indonesia
- Location: Banyuasin Regency, South Sumatra
- Coordinates: 2°22′21″S 104°48′20″E

The Port of Tanjung Api-Api is a seaport in Banyuasin Regency, South Sumatra, Indonesia. Completed in 2007, it began passenger ferry operations to Muntok in 2013, and cargo operations in 2019.

== History ==
Historically, the city of Palembang served as the primary seaport for southern Sumatra, the Musi River being wide enough to accommodate oceangoing vessels. However, due to limited ship weights caused by sandbanks in the river, plans had been made to develop a replacement port at Tanjung Api-Api since the 1930s during the Dutch East Indies era. After the provincial government of South Sumatra also proposed the development of a port at Tanjung Api-Api in 2002, construction began in 2004 and was completed in 2007. In 2009 Syahrial Oesman, the governor during the construction period, was convicted of bribery related to the port's construction. He was found to have bribed several national legislators to ease the land acquisition process for the port.

It was designed primarily as a passenger port to Bangka Island to replace the existing ferry services in Palembang, with further plans to develop an industrial estate with railway connections. The port began passenger operations in late 2013. The port and 2,000 hectares of surrounding land was designated as a special economic zone in 2014. However, due to difficulties in land acquisition, the special status was revoked in 2022. It began cargo operations in 2019.

== Services ==
Tanjung Api-Api is primarily served by roll-on/roll-off ferries to the Port of Tanjung Kalian in Muntok, Bangka Belitung Islands. Ferry services utilize a single pier, although a second pier is expected to become operational in late 2022. In the sixteen day period around the Eid al-Fitr of 2022 alone, over 60,000 passengers crossed to Tanjung Api-Api from Muntok.
