= Port of Tanjung Kalian =

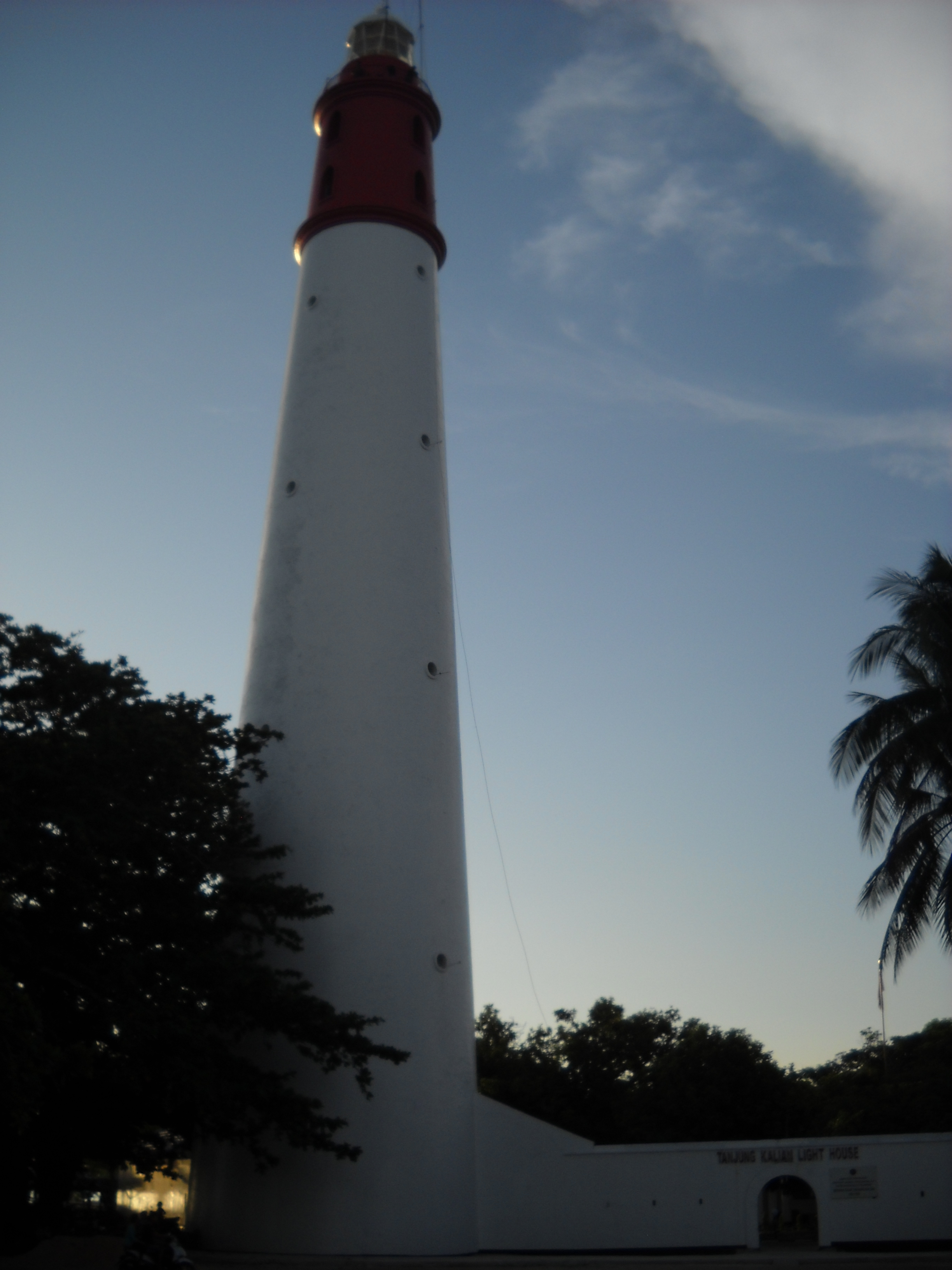
- The lighthouse at Tanjung Kalian

Location
- Country: Indonesia
- Location: Muntok, West Bangka Regency, Bangka Belitung Islands, Indonesia
- Coordinates: 2°5′2″S 105°7′58″E

The Port of Tanjung Kalian is a seaport located in the town of Muntok, in West Bangka Regency of the Bangka Belitung Islands, Indonesia. It serves as both a cargo port and a passenger ferry port, connecting the island of Bangka to Sumatra through the opposite Port of Tanjung Api-Api in South Sumatra.

== History ==
During the 1850s, Dutch colonial authorities with interests in both tin mining in Bangka and controlling traffic through the Bangka Strait established a lighthouse at Tanjung Kalian. Tanjung Kalian was chosen as the construction site due to its location at the western extremity of Bangka, making it clearly visible and prominent to passing ships. Later, in 1862, the wood-and-steel structure was improved and heightened to 56 metres (184 ft) by the Dutch tin mining company Banka Tin Winning based on an existing British design, becoming a permanent fixture of the port.

Prior to 2013, ferry services from the port went directly to Palembang, but the opening of the more nearby Port of Tanjung Api-Api in Banyuasin Regency, South Sumatra, resulted in ferries being redirected there. There are plans to expand the port's facilities with additional piers.

== Services ==
Tanjung Kalian is primarily served by roll-on/roll-off ferries to Tanjung Api-Api, typically with a ship docking every two hours. In the sixteen-day period around the Eid al-Fitr of 2022 alone, over 60,000 passengers crossed from Tanjung Kalian to Tanjung Api-Api. Despite a harbor depth of just 4 to 5 meters (13 to 16 ft), the port is also the primary cargo port in West Bangka. Planning is underway for a replacement port which would handle cargo traffic.
