= KRI Tanjung Nusanive =

Troop ship of the Indonesian Navy

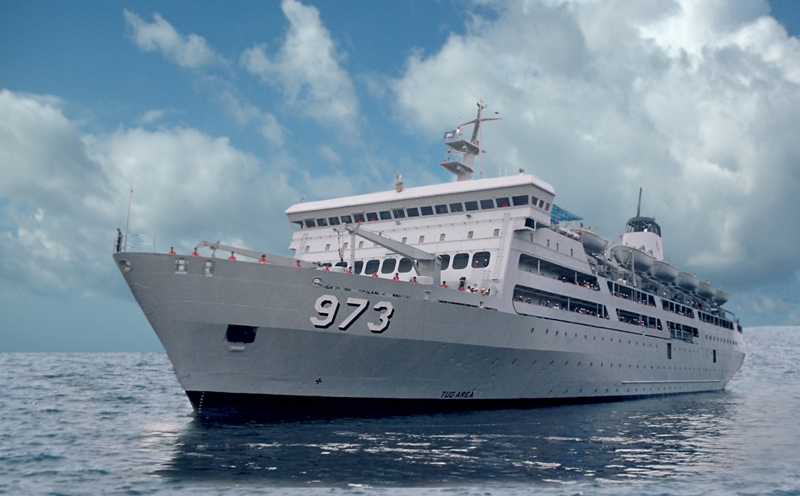
- KRI Tanjung Nusanive

History

Indonesia
- Name: KM Kambuna (1984-2005); KRI Tanjung Nusanive (2005-2020)
- Namesake: Mount Kambuna, North Luwu Regency, South Sulawesi (1984-2005); Cape Nusanive, Ambon, Maluku (2005-2020)
- Operator: Pelni (1984-2005); Indonesian Navy (2005-2020)
- Port of registry: Ujung Pandang, Indonesia (1984-2005); (Indonesia) Indonesian Navy (2005-2020)
- Builder: Meyer Werft, Papenburg, Germany
- Yard number: 609
- Launched: 15 October 1983
- Completed: February 1984
- Commissioned: 1 September 2005
- Decommissioned: 24 January 2020
- In service: 25 March 1984
- Out of service: 13 May 2005
- Refit: 2005 (as troop ship)
- Identification: IMO number: 8209688; MMSI number: 525005007; Pennant number: 973; Code letters: YDJI
- Status: Retired, awaiting disposal

General characteristics
- Type: Passenger ferry (1984-2005); Troop ship (2005-2020)
- Tonnage: 14,501 GT
- Length: 144 m (472 ft)
- Beam: 23 m (75 ft)
- Height: 40 m (130 ft)
- Draught: 5.9 m (19 ft)
- Installed power: 16,760 horsepower (12.50 MW)
- Propulsion: 2× MaK diesel engine; 2× shaft; Bow thruster
- Speed: 20 knots (37 km/h)
- Range: 5,500 nautical miles (10,200 km) at 12 knots (22 km/h)
- Capacity: 100 1st class, 200 2nd class, 300 3rd class, 472 4th class, 500 economy class passengers (1984-2005); ~2000 troops (2005-2020)
- Complement: 119
- Armament: 2 × 20mm Rheinmetall Mk 20 Rh-202 in single mount

KRI Tanjung Nusanive (973) was a troop ship of the Indonesian Navy. The ship was built at Meyer Werft, Papenburg and completed in 1984 as passenger ferry KM (Note: KM is the acronym for "Kapal Motor" or Motor Vessel (MV) in Indonesian) Kambuna of the state-owned Pelni shipping company. KM Kambuna served with Pelni until 2005 when she was transferred to the Indonesian Navy, which operated the ship until its decommissioning in early 2020.

== Characteristics ==
The ship has a length of 144 m (472 ft), a beam of 23.4 m (77 ft), height of 40 m (130 ft) with a draught of 5.9 m (19 ft) and her tonnage was measured at 13,954 GRT. The ship was powered by two MaK diesel engines, with total power output of 16,760 horsepower (12.50 MW) distributed in two shaft. She was also equipped with manoeuvring thruster located at the bow. The ship had a range of 5,500 nautical miles (10,200 km) while cruising at 12 knots (22 km/h).

As a passenger ferry, the ship had accommodation for 100 first class, 200 second class, 300 third class, 472 fourth class and 500 economy class passengers. As a troop ship, she had a complement of 119 personnel, and was able to carry up to 2000 troops and was equipped with two Rheinmetall Mk 20 Rh-202 in single mount. The ship also had VIP and VVIP facilities for head of state and other high-ranking officials, consisted of three VVIP rooms, twelve VIP rooms, meeting room, dining room and entertainment lounge.

== Service history ==
The ship was built in the early 1980s at Meyer Werft, Papenburg as KM Kambuna, a passenger ferry of the state-owned shipping company Pelni. Kambuna entered service with Pelni on 25 March 1984. The ship served in Jakarta-Surabaya-Makassar route. On 13 May 2005, Kambuna along with KM Rinjani were transferred to Indonesian Navy as KRI Tanjung Nusanive and KRI Tanjung Fatagar. According to the Pelni's Head of Public Relations at the time, the two ships were transferred because the numbers of passengers were decreasing and also rising operational costs including fuels became more expensive. The ships would undergo refit to convert them into troop transports and then commissioned on 1 September 2005.

While serving in the Navy, Tanjung Nusanive was involved in various military operations, including transporting border troops and its logistics, carrying natural disasters relief, and also took part in Navy's effort on national development through ABRI Masuk Desa program and Operation Bhakti Surya Bhaskara Jaya. Aside from transporting troops and logistics, the ship was also used by high-ranking officials while conducting inspections. The ship is also used to transport people during the annual homecoming season, with the classes ranging from economy class to VVIP class. During a period of 11–22 November 2011, Tanjung Nusanive was moored at Port of Boom Baru, Musi River in Palembang to serve as "floating hotel" for committee and team assistant of 2011 Southeast Asian Games. In addition to being a "floating hotel", the ship also opened a public visit for education on Indonesian maritime world.

On 29 April 2015 at 16:30 UTC+9, Tanjung Nusanive was involved in an accident with a passenger ferry KM Nggapulu of Pelni at Jayapura Port. When Tanjung Nusanive was performing a berthing maneuver to dock at Pier 4, it hit the pier and grazed Nggapulu which were docked at an adjacent pier. As a result of the accident, the departure of Nggapulu was delayed for an hour and the starboard bow of Tanjung Nusanive was damaged while Nggapulu only suffered scratched paints on its port hull. According to the commander of Tanjung Nusanive, the accident was caused by strong winds from the ship's portside.

In a meeting at Ministry of Tourism on 7 February 2019, Tanjung Nusanive was planned to be sunk in the Thousand Islands, Jakarta to be utilized as an underwater tourism spot. After serving for 15 years, Tanjung Nusanive was decommissioned on 24 January 2020 in a ceremony at Pelindo JICT 2 Pier, Tanjung Priok, North Jakarta.
