= Port of Tanjung Emas =

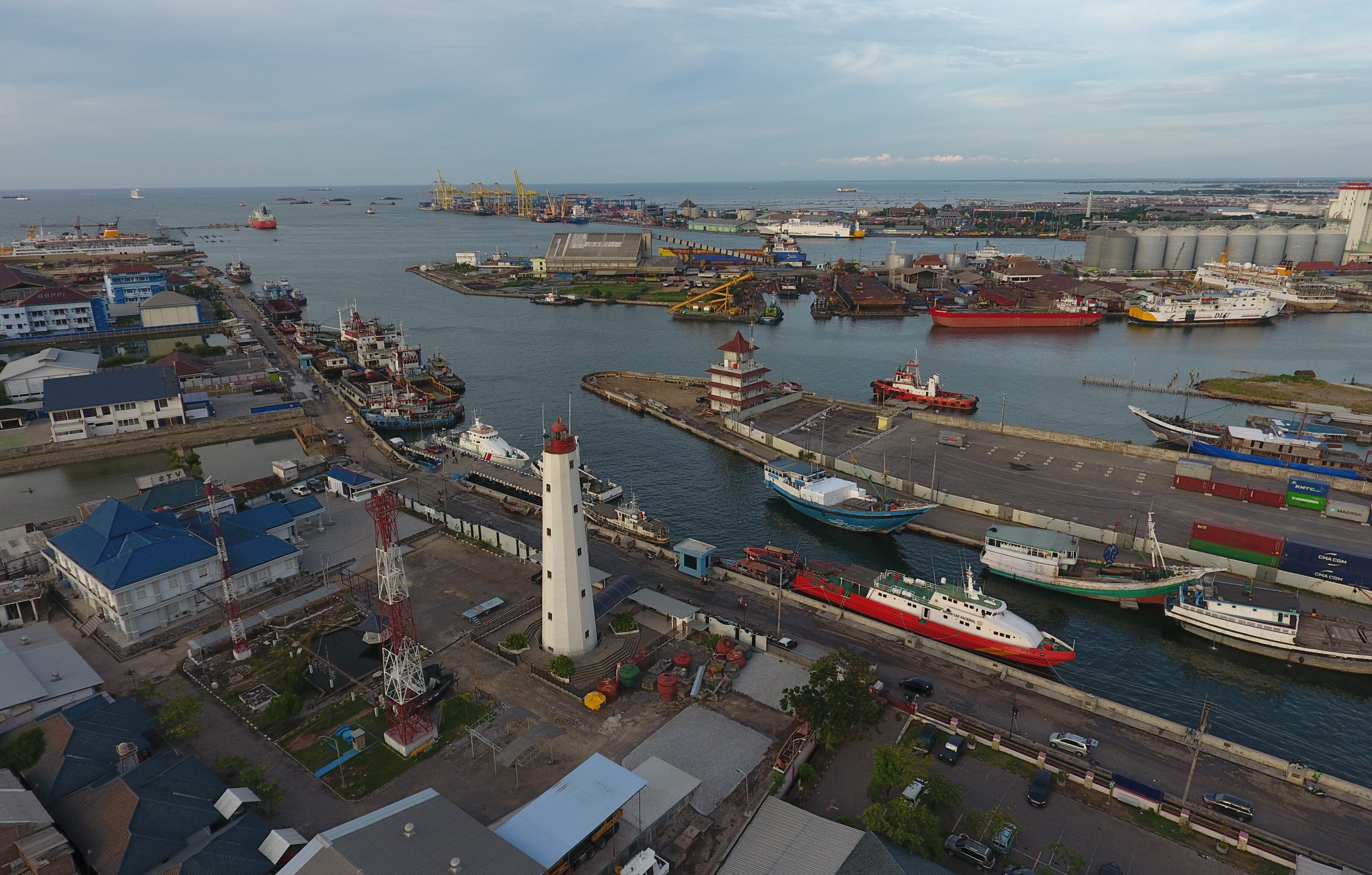
- Aerial view
- Interactive map of Port of Tanjung Emas
- Location within Semarang
- Native name: Pelabuhan Tanjung Emas (Indonesian)

Location
- Country: Indonesia
- Location: Semarang, Central Java
- Coordinates: 6.947°S 110.424°E

Details
- Owned by: PT Pelabuhan Indonesia
- No. of berths: 7

Statistics
- Annual cargo tonnage: 1,700,000 tonnes (2013)
- Annual container volume: 731,289 TEU's (2018)
- Passenger traffic: 504,700 people (2013)
- Net income: Rp 98.5 Billion
- Website www.tgemas.co.id

Port of Tanjung Emas (Indonesian: Pelabuhan Tanjung Emas) is a seaport in Semarang, Indonesia. It is the seaport in Semarang, which is located about 5 km from Tugu Muda of the city center. It was constructed in the nineteenth century by the Dutch colonial government, for use in exporting sugar and various agricultural products coming from the hinterlands in Central Java, replacing a heavily silted, pre-colonial port. The port has been operated by Pelindo since 1985.

== History ==
According to historical records, this harbor has developed since the 16th century. Previously Semarang Harbor was in Simongan hill; this area is now known as Gedong Batu (where the Sam Poo Kong Temple is located). Geologically the ancient port location of Semarang was less profitable. A large amount of sand and continuous mud deposits, causes the river that connects the city with the port to be unnavigable. Even at the mouth of the river a plain of sand formed which greatly hampered the cruising to and from the city. To overcome the unfavorable geological conditions for large ships in 1868, some trading companies did the first mud dredging. Further, a new harbor canal was created, named Nieuwe Havenkanaal, or Kali Baroe, in 1872. Through this canal, boats can sail down to the city center to drop off and load things.

After the construction of the new canal, many ships from abroad, both steamers and sailboats, arrived at the port of Semarang. During 1910 there were 985 steamers and 38 sailboats docked in Semarang. They came from various countries: England, Netherlands, Netherlands Indies, Germany, Denmark, Japan, Austria, Sweden, Norway, and France. A lighthouse in the port, known as Willem 3, had been active since 1884, as the only lighthouse in Central Java.

The Port of Semarang was developed to make the city a port city and to export commodities from Java. Despite the addition of port facilities, Semarang Harbor was narrow. At that time, the maximum which could be docked at Nusantara Pier was ships with draft of 5 meters or ± 3,500 Tons of deadweight (Dwt). Ships with draft greater than 5 meters still have to dock outside the harbor, or offshore which is ± 3 miles from the dock. It is therefore known as REDE Port. Since 1970, the flow of vessels and goods through the port tends to increase every year. According to data from 1970 to 1983 the flow of goods on average each year increases 10%. Given the limited port facilities—the depth and width of the plot / pond that are inadequate for the entry / exit of ocean vessels—the Government decided to develop the Port.

== Development ==
In 2017, Pelindo III announced plans for a land reclamation of 22 hectares estimated to be completed on 2018 as first phase of development of the port. Port supporting facilities, such as storage tanks, docks, warehouses and storage fields, will be built as part of the development. The second phase of the reclamation will encompass 82 hectares.

== Facilities ==
Facilities in Tanjung Emas port include: 1. Break Wave 2. Sailing Flow 3. Port Pool 4. Dock 5. Fender 6. Warehouse 7. Terminal area of about 3000 m^{2}. Dock facilities at this port: Nusantara, Inner Port II, Pier Dock. VII, DUKS PLTU, Pertamina DUKS, DUKS BEST, and Dribs Sriboga. Tanjung Emas Port is also supported by equipment: Snug Ships, Pandu Ships, Kepil Ships, Warehouses, Field Stacking and Bongkat equipment, and services include: Ship Services, Goods Services, Terminal Services, Land Service, Building, Water and Electricity. The port has smart passenger and freight cargo system using in check-in and check-out counters, metal detectors, x-ray machines, scales, and others.

== Crash ==
In July 2019 a big cargo ship crashed into some of the cranes and the cranes fell on to other equipment but there were no deaths.

== See also ==
- List of Indonesian ports
- Ministry of Transportation, Indonesia
- Transport in Indonesia
