= Panglima Utar Kumai =

Panglima Utar Kumai Harbor is a port in West Kotawaringin Regency, Central Kalimantan, Indonesia.

== Details ==
This port is the gateway for the sea route to the western part of Central Kalimantan, which is integrated with the container port in Kumai and ASDP RORO. Apart from functioning as a passenger terminal, this port also serves as a support for the industrial area for palm oil, rubber latex, wood products, rattan and agricultural downstream industries.
