= Port of Dobo =

Dobo Port
- Click on the map for a fullscreen view
- Dobo Port (Indonesia)

Location
- Country: Indonesia
- Location: Dobo, Maluku
- Coordinates: 05.75°S 134.21666°E
- UN/LOCODE: IDDOB

Dobo Port (Indonesian: Pelabuhan Dobo) is a small seaport located at Dobo, Aru Islands Regency, Maluku province of Indonesia. It is operated directly by regency government. Currently it has capacity of 750 GT.
