= Port of Semayang =

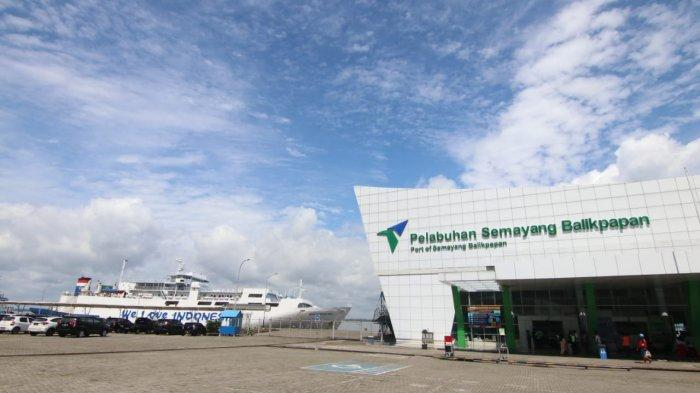
- Front facade of the harbor
- Interactive map of Port of Semayang
- Native name: Pelabuhan Semayang

Location
- Country: Indonesia
- Location: Balikpapan, East Kalimantan
- Coordinates: 1.273316°S 116.805409°E

Details
- Owned by: PT Pelabuhan Indonesia IV
- Type of harbour: Coastal tide gates
- Land area: 72.5 ha (0.725 sq km)
- No. of piers: 3

Statistics
- Website inaport4.co.id/branch/read/4/9

Port of Semayang (Indonesian: Pelabuhan Semayang) is a seaport located in Balikpapan, East Kalimantan, Indonesia. The port is the largest and busiest port in East Kalimantan. The port serves as a transport hub between East Kalimantan and other eastern Indonesian regions such as Sulawesi and East Nusa Tenggara.
