= Port of Sorong =

- Click on the map for a fullscreen view

Location
- Country: Indonesia
- Location: Sorong, Southwest Papua
- Coordinates: 0.887928°S 131.267970°E
- UN/LOCODE: ID SOQ

Details
- Operated by: PT Pelabuhan Indonesia IV
- Owned by: Sorong City Government
- Type of harbour: Coastal natural
- No. of piers: 2

Statistics
- Vessel arrivals: Daily (passenger)
- Website inaport4.co.id/branch/read/2/1

Port of Sorong is a seaport in western New Guinea. This port contains both passenger and container terminal linking the Bird's Head Peninsula with other regions of Indonesia. This port is located at Sudirman Road, Sorong District, in Sorong and operated by PT Pelabuhan Indonesia IV.
