= Muntok =

Coordinates: 2°0′S 105°5′E

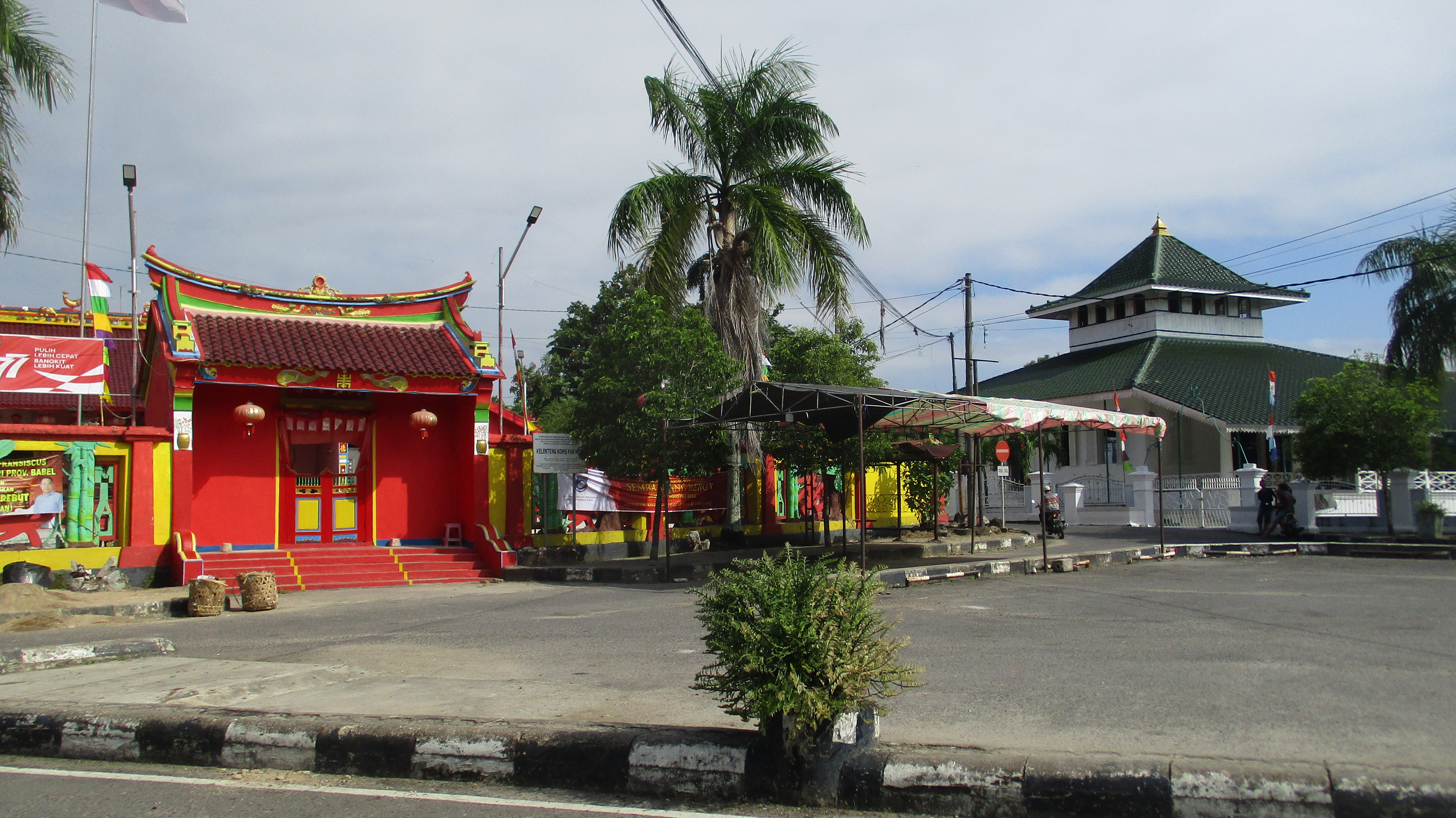
Kongfuk Temple and Jami Mosque, two icons of Muntok.

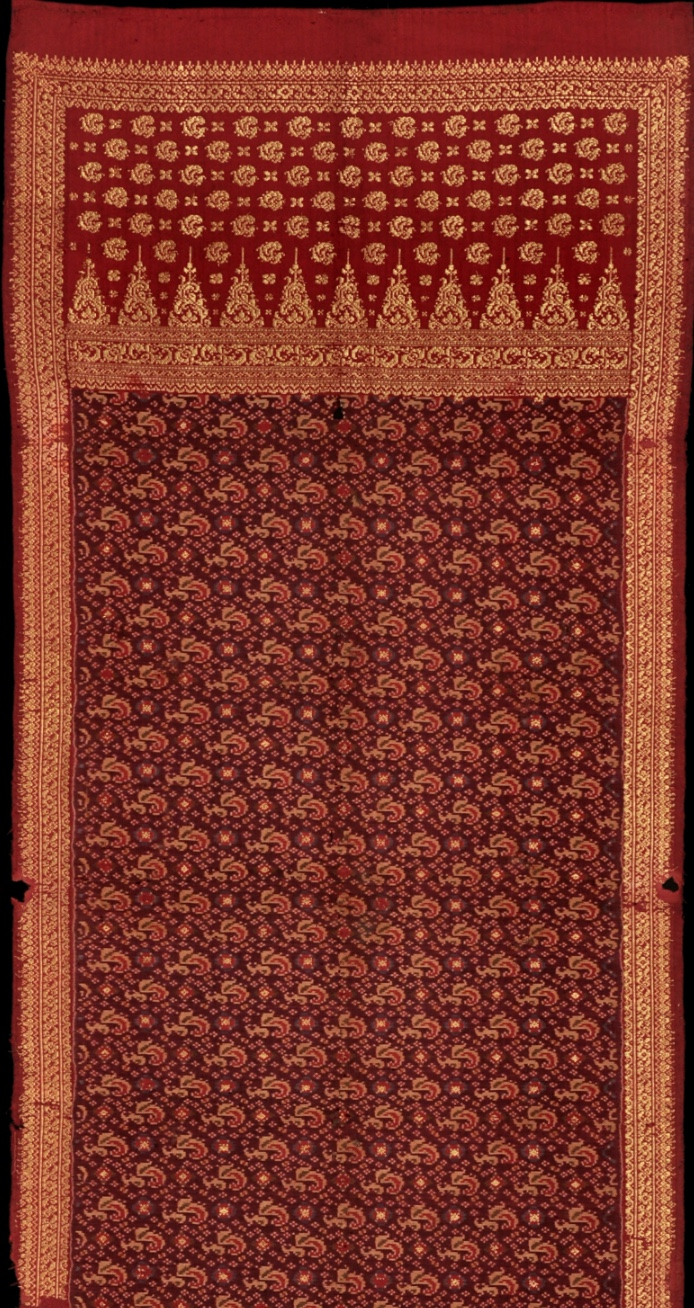
Heirloom Kain Limar (1750–1825, from Bangka, probably Muntok

Muntok (Indonesian pronunciation: [ˈmun̪t̪ɔʔ]; Chinese: 文岛) or, more commonly, Mentok (Indonesian pronunciation: [mən̪ˈt̪ɔʔ]) is a town in the Indonesian province of Bangka-Belitung on the island of Sumatra. The capital of West Bangka Regency (Bangka Barat), it is the site of the biggest tin smelter on the world. Mentok refers to the tip of the island.

== History ==
Mentok was founded at 1732 by Encek Wan Akub as the order of Sultan Palembang Darussalam Sri Susuhan Mahmud Badaruddin I, beginning as a small village consisting of 7 wooden houses for the royal family of Encek Wan Abdul Jabbar, father-in-law of Sultan Badaruddin I of Palembang Darussalam who was married his daughter Zamnah for his 2nd wife from Siantan Natuna.

Encek Wan Akub discovered a large amount of tin ore at Ulim river, south Bangka Island, on a voyage of discovery with his secret task force and reported it to Sultan Badaruddin I of Palembang Darussalam.

By approval of Sultan Badaruddin I of Palembang Darussalam, Encek Wan Akub ordered his nephew, Wan Serin, to seek tin miners in Johor, Siam and Campa and start tin mining on Bangka Island.

From that time Muntok become an exporter of tin ingots and was filled by merchant ships from many countries including the Dutch East India Company.

In 1812 the British East India Company captured Muntok, renamed it Minto (after Lord Minto, then Governor-General of India), and used it as their headquarters in Fort Nugent of Tandjoeng Kaleang to attack Palembang Darussalam for monopoly of the tin trade.

After the Anglo-Dutch Treaty of 1814 in 1816 the British left Bangka Island and Mentok to the Dutch.

In 1913 the Dutch Indies Government moved the capital of the Bangka-Belitung Residency from Mentok to Pangkal Pinang.

== Demographics ==
The majority of the people in Mentok are Malay and Hakka Chinese. The Malays are Muslims, while the Chinese are mostly Buddhist, Catholic, and Protestant. There is also a small population of Arab and Indian Muslims in the area.

== Economy ==
Mentok is a tin smelter town and many people work in the smelter. Other people are government employees, and there are also fishermen, farmers, and tin miners. Mentok is 3 hours from Palembang by ferry through the Port of Tanjung Kalian and 2 hours by paved road from Pangkal Pinang.
