= West Bangka Regency =

Regency in Bangka Belitung Islands, Indonesia

West Bangka Regency Kabupaten Bangka Barat
- Regency
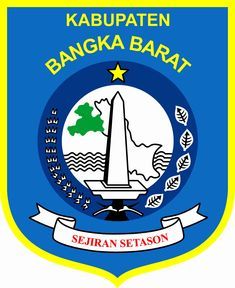
- Coat of arms
- Motto: Sejiran Setason
- Location within Bangka Belitung Islands

- Location in Sumatra and Indonesia West Bangka Regency (Indonesia)
- Coordinates: 1°51′S 105°27′E
- Country: Indonesia
- Province: Bangka Belitung Islands
- Regency seat: Mentok

Government
  - Regent: Sukirman
  - Vice Regent: Bong Ming Ming

Area
  - Total: 2,853.41 km^{2} (1,101.71 sq mi)

Population (mid 2025 estimate)
  - Total: 220,242
  - Density: 77.1855/km^{2} (199.910/sq mi)
- Time zone: UTC+7 (IWST)
- Area code: (+62) 716
- Website: portal.bangkabaratkab.go.id

West Bangka Regency (Indonesian: Kabupaten Bangka Barat) is a regency (kabupaten) of Bangka Belitung Islands Province, Indonesia. It was created on 25 February 2003 from what had previously been the western districts of Bangka Regency. It comprises the northwestern part of Bangka Island, together with a number of small islands off its coast. The regency covers an area of 2,853.41 km^{2}, and had a population of 175,110 at the 2010 Census, rising to 204,612 at the 2020 census; the official estimate as of mid 2025 was 220,242 (comprising 113,679 males and 106,563 females). The town of Mentok (previously spelt "Muntok") is its regency headquarters.

== Administrative districts ==
At the time of the 2010 Census, the Regency was divided into five districts (kecamatan), but a sixth (Parittiga) was created in 2011. These are tabulated below with their areas and their populations at the 2010 Census and the 2020 Census, together with the official estimates as of mid 2025. The table includes the locations of the district administrative centres, the number of administrative villages in each district (totaling 60 rural desa and 6 urban kelurahan), and its post code.

| Kode Wilatah | Name of District (kecamatan) | Area in km^{2} | Pop'n Census 2010 | Pop'n Census 2020 | Pop'n Estimate mid 2025 | Admin centre | No. of villages | Post code |
|---|---|---|---|---|---|---|---|---|
| 19.05.04 | Kelapa | 584.77 | 30,537 | 34,451 | 36,215 | Kelapa | 14 ^{(a)} | 33364 |
| 19.05.05 | Tempilang ^{(b)} | 388.63 | 24,379 | 28,460 | 30,609 | Tempilang | 9 | 33365 |
| 19.05.01 | Mentok | 371.77 | 45,523 | 52,745 | 56,769 | Tanjung | 9 ^{(c)} | 33351 ^{(d)} |
| 19.05.02 | Simpang Teritip | 789.46 | 26,539 | 30,378 | 33,410 | Pelangas | 13 | 33366 |
| 19.05.03 | Jebus ^{(e)} | 389.76 | 48,172 | 22,522 | 24,490 | Jebus | 11 | 33362 |
| 19.05.06 | Parittiga | 327.02 | ^{(f)} | 36,056 | 38,749 | Puput | 10 | 33363 |
| | Total | 2,853.41 | 175,150 | 204,612 | 220,242 | Mentok | 66 | |

Note: (a) including the kelurahan of Kelapa. (b) including three offshore islands - Pulau Batubelilik, Pulau Batudatek and Pulau Semumbung.
(c) comprising 5 kelurahan (Keranggan, Menjelang, Sungai Baru, Sungai Daeng and Tanjung) and 4 desa.
(d) except the 3 kelurahan of Tanjung (post code 33311), Sungai Baru (post code 33312) and Sungai Daeng (post code 33313).
(e) there are 85 offshore islets in Jebus and Parittiga Districts.
(f) the 2010 population of Parittiga District is included in the figure for Jebus District, from which it was cut out in 2011.
